= Aalen =

Town in Baden-Württemberg, Germany

- Town
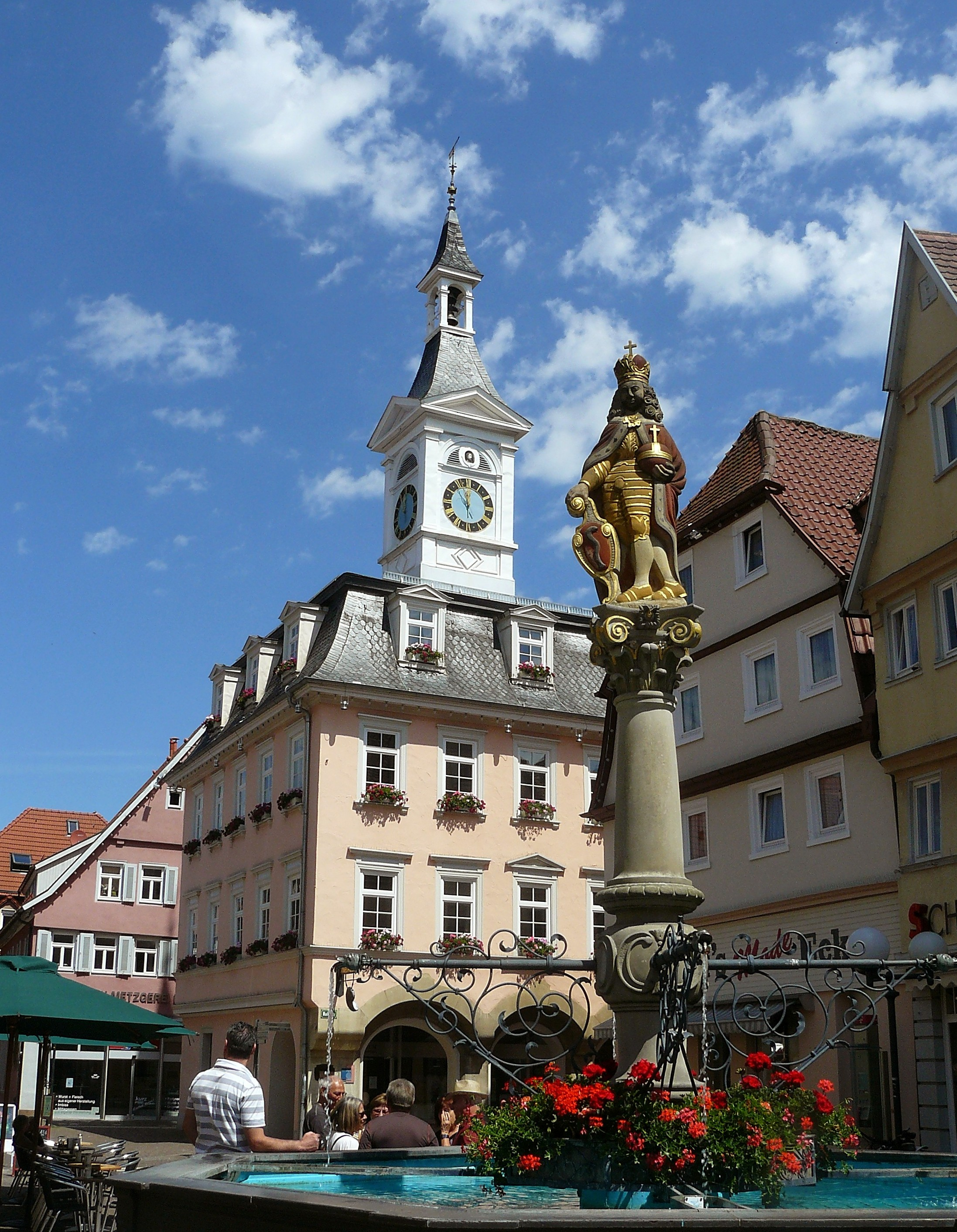

- Flag Coat of arms

- Location of Aalen within Ostalbkreis district
- Interactive map of Aalen
- Location within Germany Location within Baden-Württemberg
- Coordinates: 48°50′N 10°6′E
- Country: Germany
- State: Baden-Württemberg
- Admin. region: Stuttgart
- District: Ostalbkreis

Government
  - Mayor (2021–29): Frederick Brütting (SPD)

Area
  - Total: 146.58 km^{2} (56.59 sq mi)
- Elevation: 430 m (1,410 ft)

Population (2025-12-31)
  - Total: 67,675
  - Density: 461.69/km^{2} (1,195.8/sq mi)
- Time zone: UTC+01:00 (CET)
  - Summer (DST): UTC+02:00 (CEST)
- Postal codes: 73430–73434
- Dialling codes: 07361/-66/-67
- Vehicle registration: AA
- Website: www.aalen.de

Aalen (German pronunciation: [ˈaːlən]; Swabian: Oole (Swabian pronunciation: [ˈɔːlɐ̃])) is a town located in the eastern part of the German state of Baden-Württemberg, about 70 kilometres (43 mi) east of Stuttgart and 48 kilometres (30 mi) north of Ulm. It is the seat and largest town of the Ostalbkreis district, as well as the largest in the Ostwürttemberg region.

Since 1956, Aalen has had the status of Große Kreisstadt (major district town). It is noted for its many half-timbered houses constructed from the 16th century through the 18th century.

With an area of 146.63 km^{2}, Aalen is ranked 7th in Baden-Württemberg and 2nd within the Government Region of Stuttgart, after Stuttgart. With a population of about 66,000, Aalen is the 15th most-populated settlement in Baden-Württemberg.

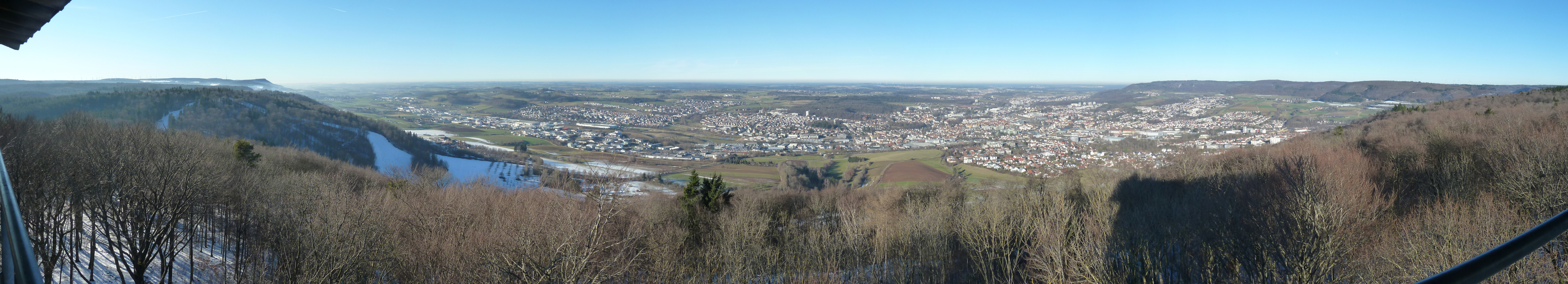
Panoramic view from the Aalbäumle (14 January 2022)

== Geography ==
=== Situation ===
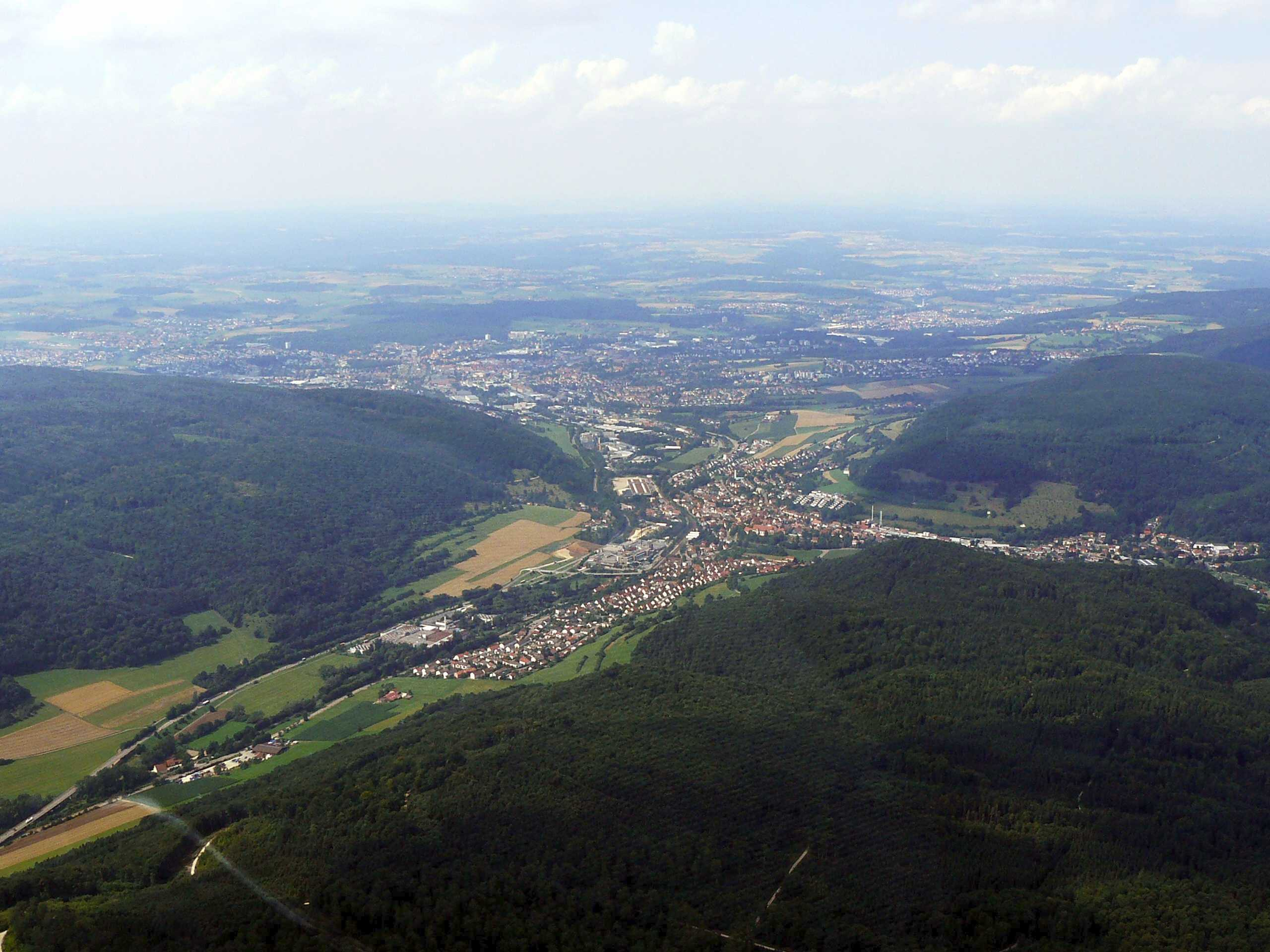
Aerial view of the district of Unterkochen (the town centre is partly covered and in the background), the Aalen lowlands well perceptible in the back

Aalen is situated on the upper reaches of the river Kocher, at the foot of the Swabian Jura which lies to the south and south-east, and close to the hilly landscapes of the Ellwangen Hills to the north and the Welland to the north-west.

The west of Aalen's territory is on the foreland of the eastern Swabian Jura, and the north and north-west is on the Swabian-Franconian Forest, both being part of the Swabian Keuper-Lias Plains. The south-west is part of the Albuch, the east is part of the Härtsfeld, these two both being parts of the Swabian Jura.

The Kocher enters the town's territory from Oberkochen to the south, crosses the district of Unterkochen, then enters the town centre, where the Aal flows into it. The Aal is a small river located only within the town's territory. Next, the Kocher crosses the district of Wasseralfingen, then leaves the town for Hüttlingen. Rivers originating near Aalen are the Rems (near Essingen, west of Aalen) and the Jagst (near Unterschneidheim, east of Aalen), both being tributaries of the Neckar, just like the Kocher.

The elevation in the centre of the market square is 430 m (1,410 ft) relative to Normalhöhennull. The territory's lowest point is at the Lein river near Rodamsdörfle, the highest point is the Grünberg's peak near Unterkochen at 733 m (2,405 ft).

=== Geology ===
Aalen's territory ranges over all lithostratigraphic groups of the South German Jurassic: Aalen's south and the Flexner massif are on top of the White Jurassic, the town centre is on the Brown Jurassic, and a part of Wasseralfingen is on the Black Jurassic. As a result, the town advertises itself as a "Geologist's Mecca".

Most parts of the territory are on the Opalinuston-Formation (Opalinum Clay Formation) of the Aalenian subdivision of the Jurassic Period, which is named after Aalen. On the Sandberg, the Schnaitberg and the Schradenberg hills, all in the west of Aalen, the Eisensandstein (Iron Sandstone) formation emerges to the surface. On the other hills of the city, sands (Goldshöfer Sande), gravel and residual rubble prevail. The historic centre of Aalen and the other areas in the Kocher valley are founded completely on holocenic floodplain loam (Auelehm) and riverbed gravel that have filled in the valley.

Most parts of Dewangen and Fachsenfeld are founded on formations of Jurensismergel (Jurensis Marl), Posidonienschiefer (cf. Posidonia Shale), Amaltheenton (Amalthean Clay), Numismalismergel (Numismalis Marl) and Obtususton (Obtusus Clay, named after Asteroceras obtusum ammonites) moving from south to north, all belonging to the Jurassic and being rich in fossils. They are at last followed by the Trossingen Formation already belonging to the Late Triassic.

Until 1939 iron ore was mined on the Braunenberg hill. (see Tiefer Stollen section).

=== Extent of the borough ===
The maximum extent of the town's territory amounts to 18 km (11 mi) in a north–south dimension and 25 km (16 mi) in an east–west dimension. The area is 14,662.8 hectares (36,233 acres), which includes 42.2% 6,186.2 ha (15,286 acres) agriculturally used area and 37.7% 5,534.9 ha (13,677 acres) of forest. 11.5% 1,692.3 ha (4,182 acres) are built up or vacant, 6.4% 932.8 ha (2,305 acres) is used by traffic infrastructure. Sporting and recreation grounds and parks comprise 1% 152.7 hectares (377 acres), other areas 1.1% 163.9 ha (405 acres).

=== Boroughs ===
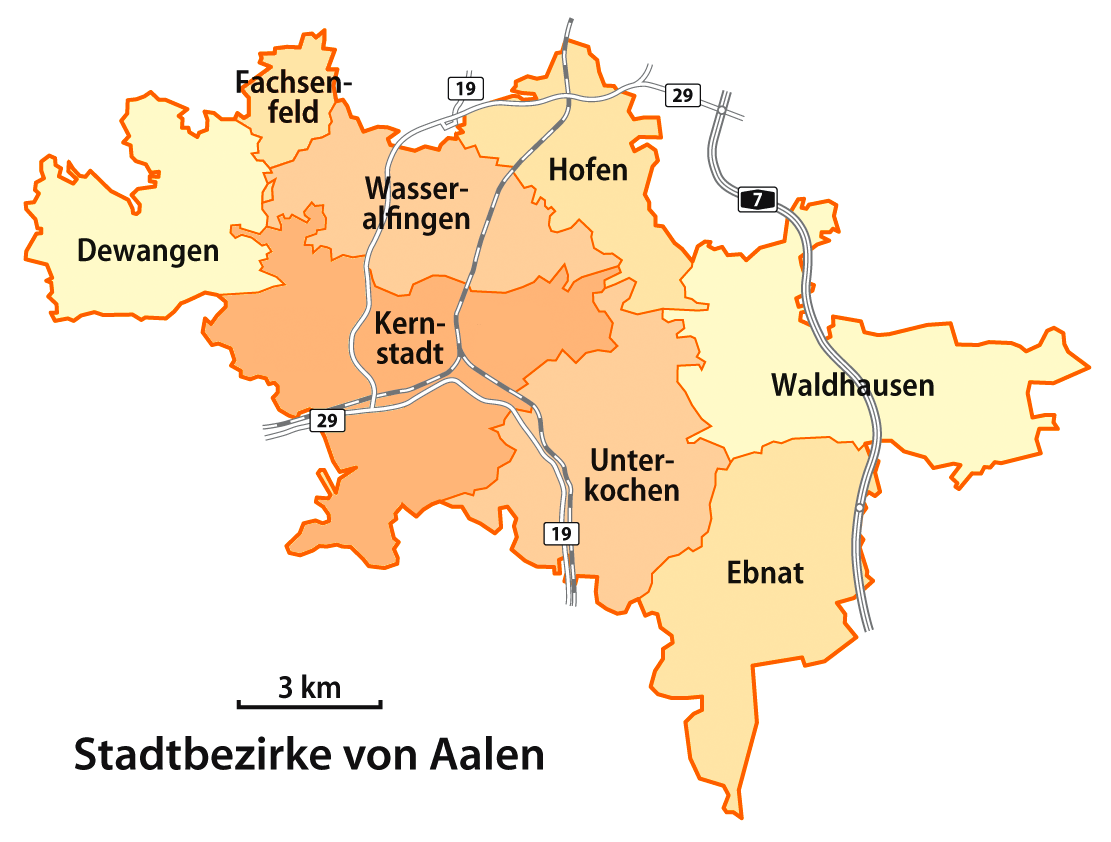
Map of Aalen's boroughs (Stadtbezirke)

Aalen's territory consists of the town centre (Kernstadt) and the municipalities merged from between 1938 (Unterrombach) and 1975 (Wasseralfingen, see mergings section). The municipalities merged in the course of the latest municipal reform of the 1970s are also called Stadtbezirke (quarters or districts), and are Ortschaften ("settlements") in terms of Baden-Württemberg's Gemeindeordnung (municipal code), which means, each of them has its own council elected by its respective residents (Ortschaftsrat) and is presided by a spokesperson (Ortsvorsteher).

The town centre itself and the merged former municipalities consist of numerous villages (Teilorte), mostly separated by open ground from each other and having their own independent and long-standing history. Some however have been created as planned communities, which were given proper names, but no well-defined borders.

List of villages:

Borough	Coat of arms	Area in km^{2}	Residents (1 July 2011)	Villages
Town centre	Coat of arms of Aalen	30.62	34,466	Hammerstadt, Hofherrnweiler, Mädle, Mantelhof, Neßlau, Oberrombach, Unterrombach, the latter also known as Weststadt ("West Town")
Dewangen	Coat of arms of Dewangen	16.53	3,183	Aushof, Bernhardsdorf, Bronnenhäusle, Degenhof, Dreherhof, Faulherrnhof, Freudenhöfle, Gobühl, Großdölzerhof, Haldenhaus, Hüttenhöfe, Kleindölzerhof, Kohlhöfle, Langenhalde, Lusthof, Neuhof, Rauburr, Reichenbach, Riegelhof, Rodamsdörfle, Rotsold, Schafhof, Schultheißenhöfle, Streithöfle, Tannenhof, Trübenreute
Ebnat	Coat of arms of Ebnat	21.16	3,327	Affalterwang, Diepertsbuch, Niesitz
Fachsenfeld	Coat of arms of Fachsenfeld	3.95	3,605	Bodenbach, Hangendenbuch, Himmlingsweiler, Mühlhäusle, Scherrenmühle, Waiblingen
Hofen	Coat of arms of Hofen	12.58	2,080	Attenhofen, Fürsitz, Goldshöfe, Heimatsmühle, Oberalfingen, Wagenrain
Unterkochen	Coat of arms of Unterkochen	21.44	4,927	Birkhöfe, Glashütte, Neukochen, Neuziegelhütte, Stefansweilermühle
Waldhausen	Coat of arms of Waldhausen	24.38	2,335	Arlesberg, Bernlohe, Beuren, Brastelburg, Geiselwang, Hohenberg, Neubau, Simmisweiler
Wasseralfingen	Coat of arms of Wasseralfingen	15.97	11,767	Affalterried, Brausenried, Bürgle, Erzhäusle, Heisenberg, Mäderhof, Onatsfeld, Rötenberg, Röthardt, Salchenhof, Treppach, Weidenfeld

=== Spatial planning ===
Aalen forms a Mittelzentrum ("medium-level centre") within the Ostwürttemberg region. Its designated catchment area includes the following municipalities of the central and eastern Ostalbkreis district: Abtsgmünd, Bopfingen, Essingen, Hüttlingen, Kirchheim am Ries, Lauchheim, Neresheim, Oberkochen, Riesbürg and Westhausen, and is interwoven with the catchment area of Nördlingen, situated in Bavaria, 30 km (19 mi) east of Aalen.

=== Climate ===
As Aalen's territory sprawls on escarpments of the Swabian Jura, on the Albuch and the Härtsfeld landscapes, and its elevation has a range of 355 m (1,165 ft), the climate varies from district to district.

The weather station the following data originate from is located between the town centre and Wasseralfingen at about 48°51′02″N 10°05′44″E and has been in operation since 1991.

The sunshine duration is about 1800 hours per year, which averages 4.93 hours per day. Thus Aalen's annual sunshine duration ranks higher than the German average of 1550 hours per year. However, with 167 days of precipitation, Aalen's region also ranks above the German average of 138. The annual rainfall is 807 mm (31.8 in), about the average within Baden-Württemberg. The annual mean temperature is 9.9 °C (49.8 °F). Here Aalen ranks above the German average of 8.2 °C (46.8 °F) and the Baden-Württemberg average of 8.1 °C (46.6 °F).

Climate data for Aalen
Month	Jan	Feb	Mar	Apr	May	Jun	Jul	Aug	Sep	Oct	Nov	Dec	Year
Mean daily maximum °C (°F)	2 (36)	4 (39)	9 (48)	14 (57)	18 (64)	21 (70)	23 (73)	23 (73)	20 (68)	13 (55)	7 (45)	3 (37)	13 (55)
Daily mean °C (°F)	1.2 (34.2)	2.0 (35.6)	5.5 (41.9)	9.4 (48.9)	14.3 (57.7)	17.5 (63.5)	19.2 (66.6)	18.9 (66.0)	14.2 (57.6)	10.0 (50.0)	4.6 (40.3)	1.4 (34.5)	9.9 (49.7)
Mean daily minimum °C (°F)	−4 (25)	−3 (27)	0 (32)	4 (39)	8 (46)	11 (52)	12 (54)	12 (54)	9 (48)	5 (41)	1 (34)	−2 (28)	4 (40)
Average precipitation mm (inches)	54.5 (2.15)	50.8 (2.00)	74.3 (2.93)	55.4 (2.18)	79.4 (3.13)	68.7 (2.70)	87.9 (3.46)	80.8 (3.18)	67.6 (2.66)	72.4 (2.85)	59.0 (2.32)	56.1 (2.21)	806.9 (31.77)
Average rainy days	16	13	12	14	14	15	15	14	14	12	15	13	167
Mean monthly sunshine hours	62	84.75	155	180	217	210	248	217	180	124	60	62	1,799.75

== History ==
=== Civic history ===
==== First settlements ====
Numerous remains of early civilization have been found in the area. Tools made of flint and traces of Mesolithic human settlement dated between the 8th and 5th millennium BC were found on several sites on the margins of the Kocher and Jagst valleys. On the Schloßbaufeld plateau (appr. 650 by 350 m (2,130 by 1,150 ft)), situated behind Kocherburg castle near Unterkochen, a hill-top settlement was found, with the core being dated to the Bronze Age. In the Appenwang forest near Wasseralfingen, in Goldshöfe, and in Ebnat, tumuli of the Hallstatt culture were found. In Aalen and Wasseralfingen, gold and silver coins left by the Celts were found. The Celts were responsible for the fortifications in the Schloßbaufeld settlement consisting of sectional embankments and a stone wall. Also, Near Heisenberg (Wasseralfingen), a Celtic nemeton has been identified; however, it is no longer readily apparent.

==== Roman era ====
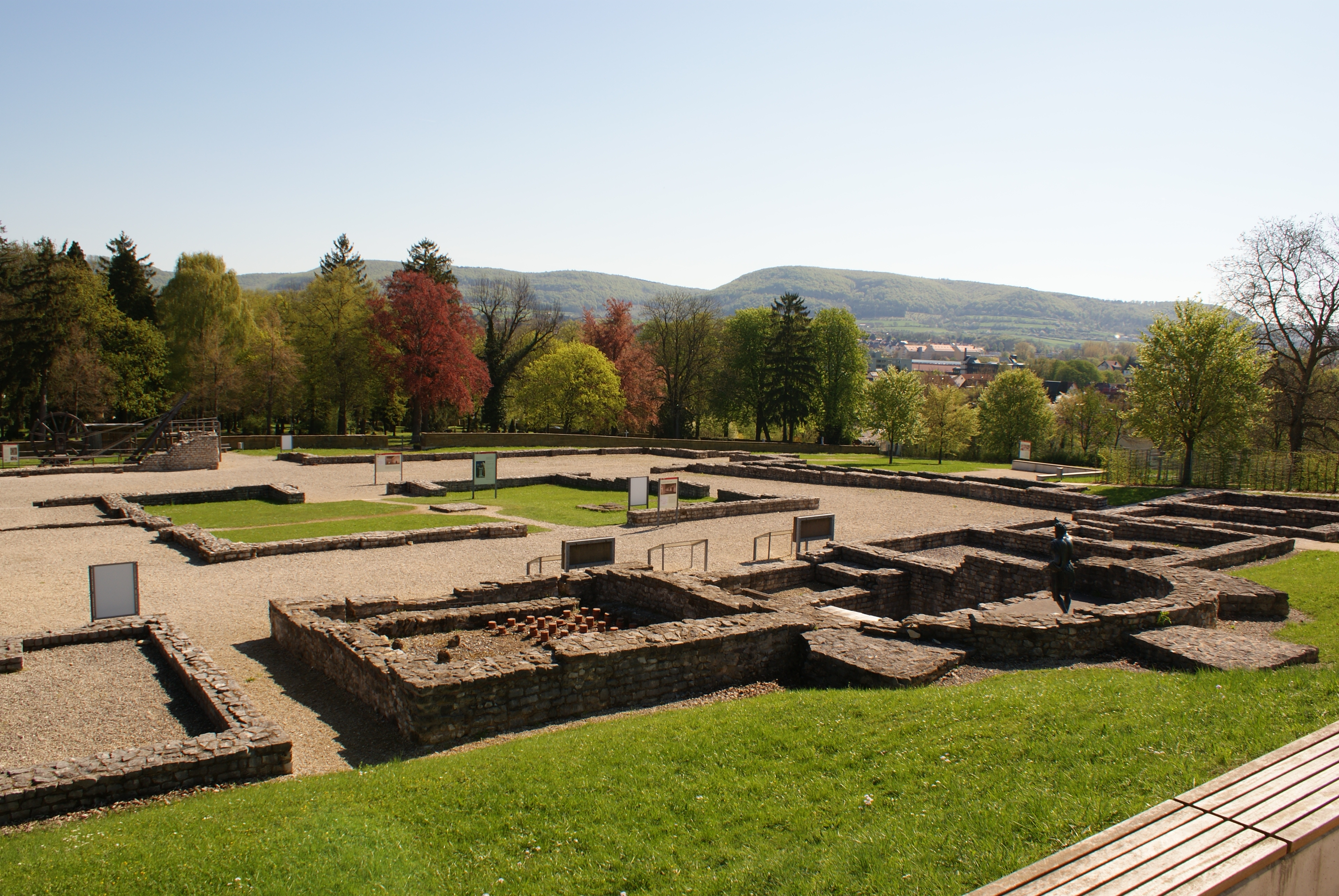
The Roman fort's excavated foundation walls

After abandoning the Alb Limes (a limes generally following the ridgeline of the Swabian Jura) around 150 AD, Aalen's territory became part of the Roman Empire, in direct vicinity of the then newly erected Rhaetian Limes. The Romans erected a castrum to house the cavalry unit Ala II Flavia milliaria; its remains are known today as Kastell Aalen ("Aalen Roman fort"). The site is west of today's town centre at the bottom of the Schillerhöhe hill. With about 1,000 horsemen and nearly as many grooms, it was the largest fort of auxiliaries along the Rhaetian Limes. There were Civilian settlements adjacent along the south and the east. Around 260 AD, the Romans gave up the fort as they withdrew their presence in unoccupied Germania back to the Rhine and Danube rivers, and the Alamanni took over the region. Based on 3rd- and 4th-century coins found, the civilian settlement continued to exist for the time being. However, there is no evidence of continued civilization between the Roman era and the Middle Ages.

==== Foundation ====
Based on discovery of alamannic graves, archaeologists have established the 7th century as the origination of Aalen. In the northern and western walls of St. John's church, which is located directly adjacent to the eastern gate of the Roman fort, Roman stones were incorporated. The building that exists today probably dates to the 9th century.

The first mention of Aalen was in 839, when emperor Louis the Pious reportedly permitted the Fulda monastery to exchange land with the Hammerstadt village, then known as Hamarstat. Aalen itself was first mentioned in an inventory list of Ellwangen Abbey, dated ca. 1136, as the village Alon, along with a lower nobleman named Conrad of Aalen. This nobleman probably had his ancestral castle at a site south of today's town centre and was subject first to Ellwangen abbey, later to the House of Hohenstaufen, and eventually to the House of Oettingen. 1426 was the last time a member of that house was mentioned in connection with Aalen. Documents, from the Middle Ages, indicate that the town of Aalen was founded by the Hohenstaufen some time between 1241 and 1246, but at a different location than the earlier village, which was supposedly destroyed in 1388 during the war between the Alliance of Swabian Cities and the Dukes of Bavaria. Later, it is documented that the counts of Oettingen ruled the town in 1340. They are reported to have pawned the town to Count Eberhard II and subsequently to the House of Württemberg in 1358 or 1359 in exchange for an amount of money.

==== Imperial City ====
During the war against Württemberg, Emperor Charles IV took the town without a fight after a siege. On 3 December 1360, he declared Aalen an Imperial City, that is, a city or town responsible only to the emperor, a status that made it a quasi-sovereign city-state and that it kept until 1803. In 1377, Aalen joined the Alliance of Swabian Cities, and in 1385, the term civitas appears in the town's seal for the first time. In 1398, Aalen was granted the right to hold markets, and in 1401 Aalen obtained proper jurisdiction.

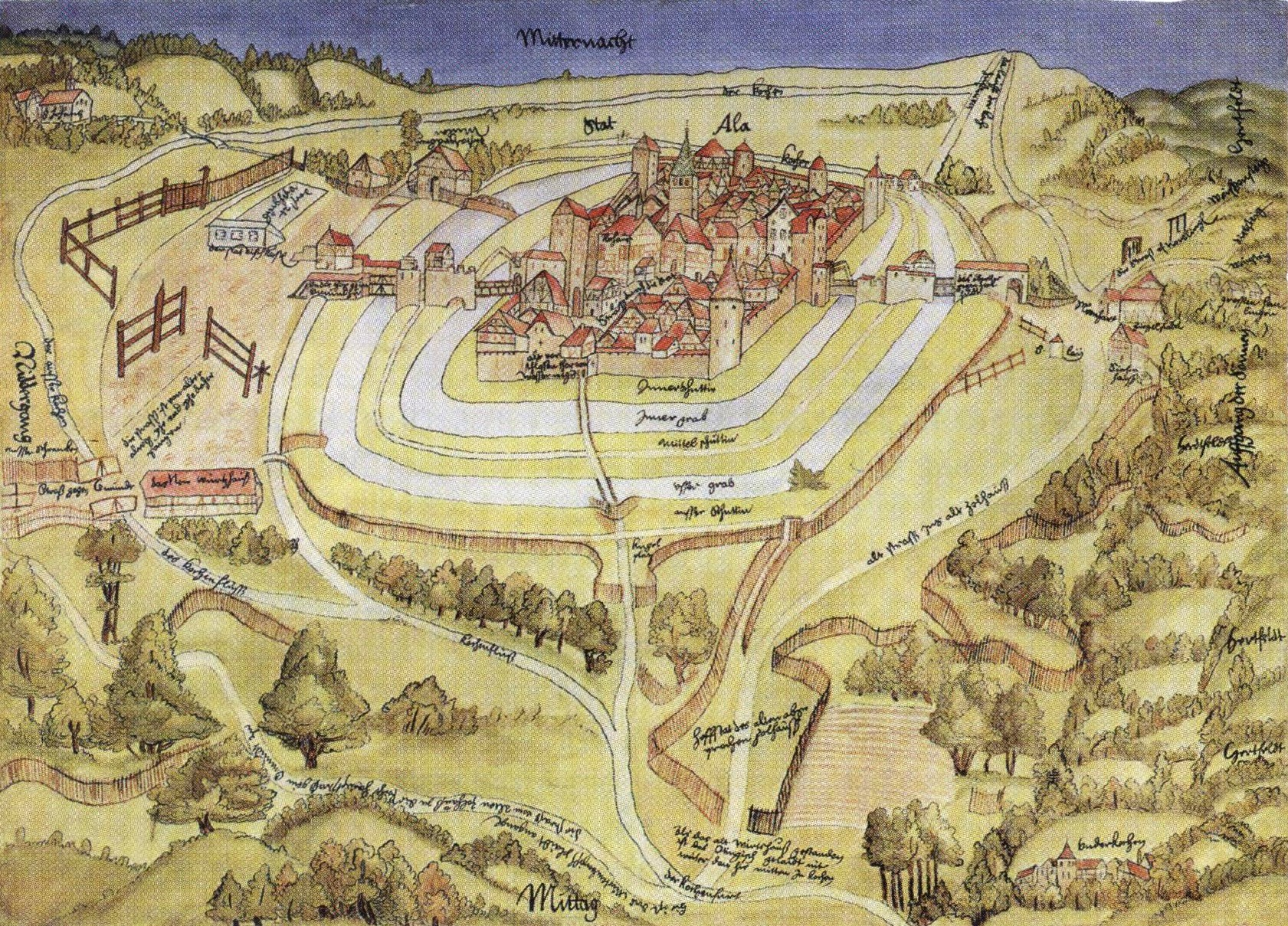
Town view of 1528

The oldest artistic representation of Aalen was made in 1528. It was made as the basis of a lawsuit between the town and the Counts of Oettingen at the Reichskammergericht in Speyer. It shows Aalen surrounded by walls, towers, and double moats. The layout of the moats, which had an embankment built between them, is recognizable by the present streets named Nördlicher, Östlicher, Südlicher and Westlicher Stadtgraben (Northern, Eastern, Southern and Western Moat respectively). The wall was about 6 metres (20 ft) tall, 1518 single paces (990 metres (3,250 ft)) long and enclosed an area of 5.3 hectares (13 acres). During its early years, the town had two town gates: The Upper or Ellwangen Gate in the east, and St. Martin's gate in the south; however due to frequent floods, St. Martin's gate was bricked up in the 14th century and replaced by the Lower or Gmünd Gate built in the west before 1400. Later, several minor side gates were added. The central street market took place on the Wettegasse (today called Marktplatz, "market square") and the Reichsstädter Straße. So the market district stretched from one gate to the other, however in Aalen it was not straight, but with a 90-degree curve between southern (St. Martin's) gate and eastern (Ellwangen) gate.

Around 1500, the civic graveyard was relocated from the town church to St. John's Church, and in 1514, the Vierundzwanziger ("Group of 24") was the first assembly constituted by the citizens.

===== Reformation =====
Delegated by Württemberg's Duke Louis III, on 28 June 1575, nearly 30 years after Martin Luther's death, Jakob Andreae, professor and chancellor of the University of Tübingen, arrived in Aalen. The sermon he gave the following day convinced the mayor, the council, and the citizens to adopt the Reformation in the town. Andreae stayed in Aalen for four weeks to help with the change. This brought along enormous changes, as the council forbade the Roman Catholic priests to celebrate masses and give sermons. However, after victories of the imperial armies at the beginning of the Thirty Years' War, the Prince-Provostry of Ellwangen, which still held the right of patronage in Aalen, were able to temporarily bring Catholicism back to Aalen; however after the military successes of the Protestant Union, Protestant church practices were instituted again.

===== Fire of 1634 =====
On the night of 5 September 1634, two ensigns of the army of Bernard of Saxe-Weimar who were fighting with the Swedes and retreating after the Battle of Nördlingen set fire to two powder carriages, to prevent the war material to fall into Croatian hands and to prevent their advance. The result was a conflagration, that some say destroyed portions of the town. There are differing stories regarding this fire. According to 17th-century accounts, the church and all the buildings, except of the Schwörturm tower, were casualties of the fire, and only nine families survived. 19th century research by Hermann Bauer, Lutheran pastor and local historian, discovered that the 17th-century account is exaggerated, but he does agree that the town church and buildings in a "rather large" semicircle around it were destroyed. The fire also destroyed the town archive housed in an addition to the church, with all of its documents. After the fire, soldiers of both armies went through the town looting. It took nearly 100 years for the town to reach its population of 2,000.

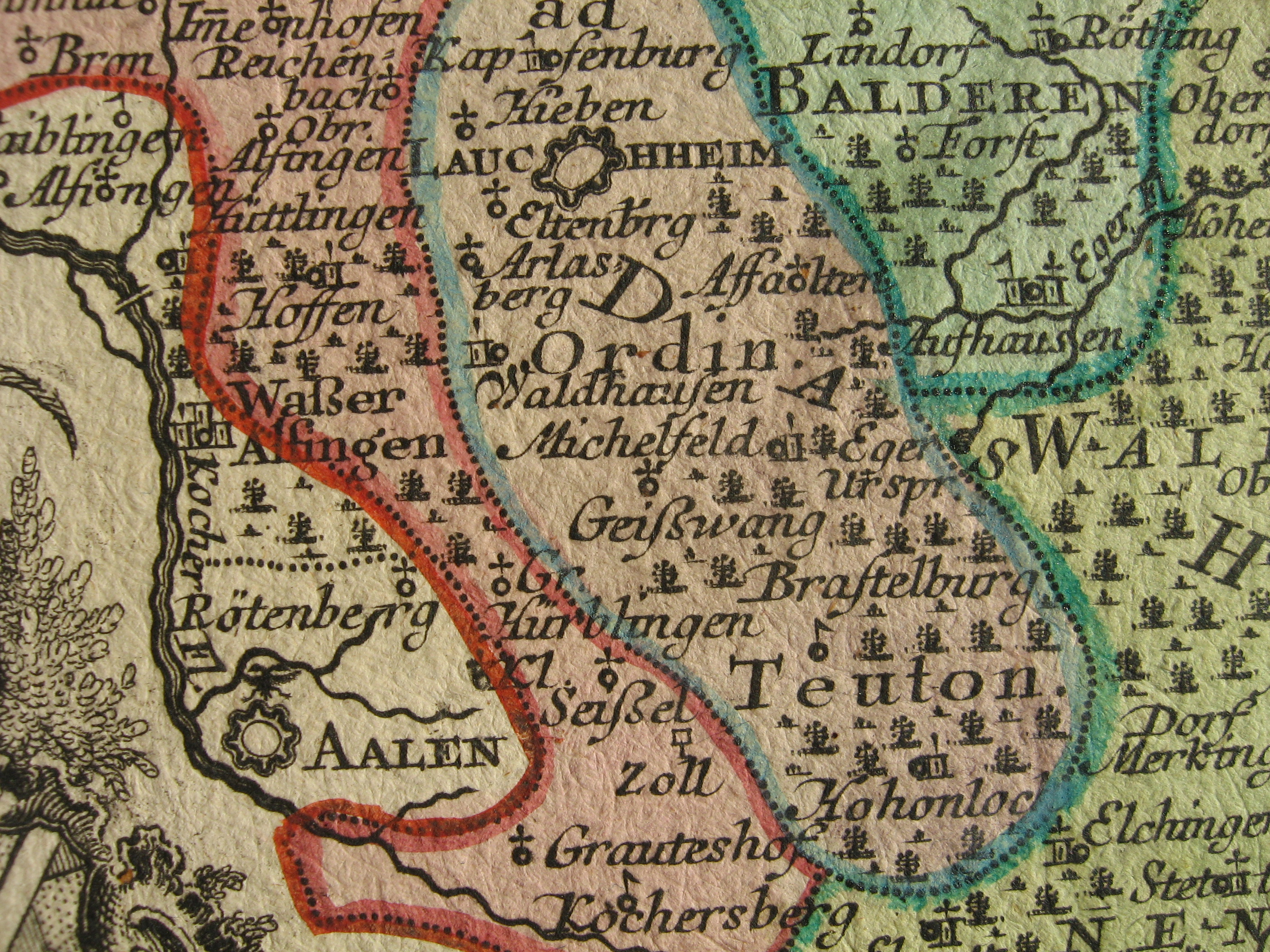
Territory of the Imperial City of Aalen

French troops marched through Aalen in 1688 during the Nine Years' War; however, unlike other places, they left without leaving severe damages. The French came through again in 1702 during the War of the Spanish Succession and in 1741 during the War of the Austrian Succession, the latter also caused imperial troops to move through in 1743.

The town church's tower collapsed in 1765, presumably because proper building techniques were not utilized during the reconstruction after the fire of 1634. The collapsing tower struck two children of the tower watchman who died of their injuries, and destroyed the nave, leaving only the altar cross intact. The remaining walls had to be knocked down due to the damage. Reconstruction began the same year, creating the building that exists today.

On 22 November 1749, the so-called Aalen protocol regulating the cohabitation of Lutherans and Roman Catholics in the jointly ruled territory of Oberkochen was signed in Aalen by the Duchy of Württemberg and the Prince-Provostry of Ellwangen. Aalen had been chosen because of its neutral status as a Free Imperial City.

===== Napoleonic era and end of the Imperial City of Aalen =====
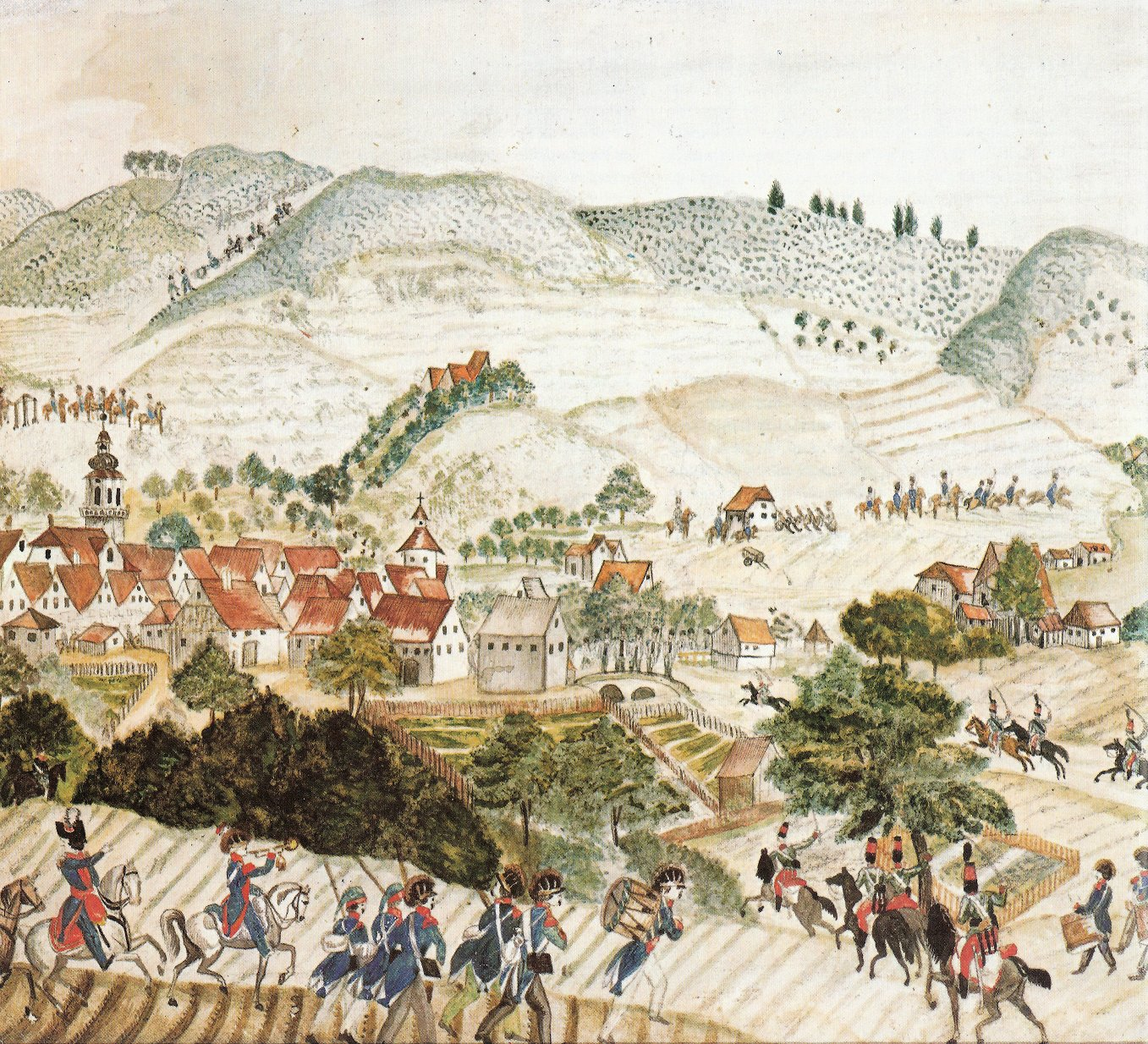
French attack on Aalen of 1796

During the War of the First Coalition (1796), Aalen was looted. The War of the Second Coalition concluded in 1801 with the signing of the Treaty of Lunéville, which led to the German Mediatisation of 1803 that assigned most Imperial Cities to the neighbouring principalities. Aalen was assigned to the Electorate of Württemberg, which later became the Kingdom of Württemberg, and became seat of the District ("Oberamt") of Aalen. During the War of the Third Coalition, on 6 October 1805, Napoleon Bonaparte arrived in Aalen, with an army of 40,000. This event, along with Bavarian and Austrian troops moving in some days later, caused miseries that according to the town clerk "no feather could describe".

In 1811, the municipality of Unterrombach was formed out of some villages previously belonging to Aalen, some to the Barons of Wöllwarth, and the eastern villages were assigned to the municipality of Unterkochen.

In the age of the Napoleonic wars, the town walls were no longer of use, and in the 18th century, with the maintenance of walls, gates and towers becoming more neglected Finally, due to the fact that the funds were lacking, starting in 1800, most towers were demolished, the other buildings followed soon.

==== Industrial Revolution ====
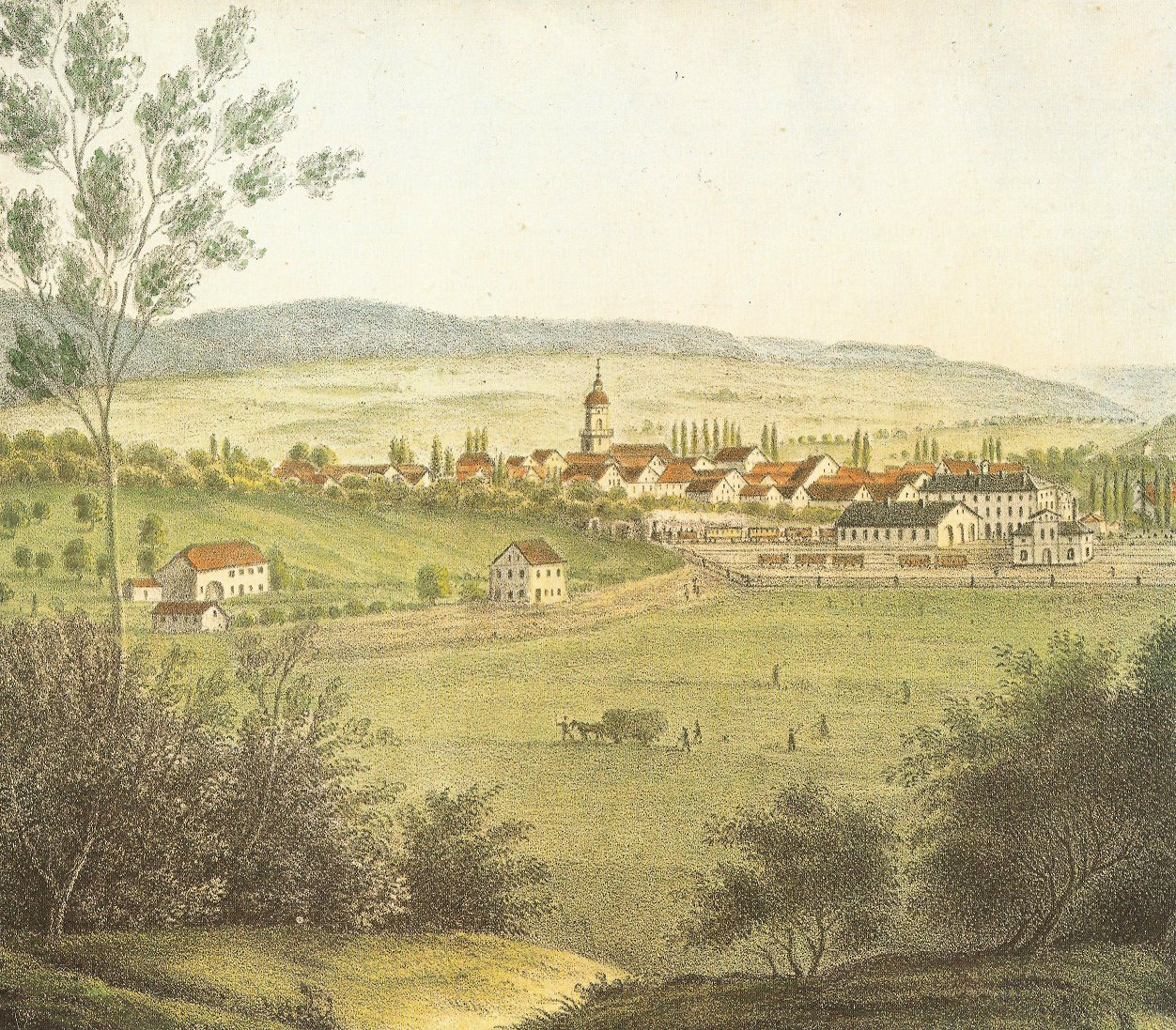
Railway station and town after 1861

Before the Industrial Revolution, Aalen's economy was shaped by its rural setting. Many citizens were pursuing farming besides their craft, such as tanning. In the mid 19th century, there were twelve tanneries in Aalen, due to the proximity of Ulm, an important sales market. Other crafts that added to the economy were weaving mills, which produced linen and woolen goods, and baking of sweet pastry and gingerbread.

In Aalen, industrialisation was a slow process. The first major increase was in the 1840s, when three factories for nails and some other factories emerged. It was the link with the railway network, by the opening of the Rems Railway from Cannstatt to Wasseralfingen in 1861, that brought more industry to Aalen, along with the royal steel mill (later Schwäbische Hüttenwerke) in Wasseralfingen. The Rems Railway's extension to Nördlingen in 1863, the opening of the Brenz Railway in 1864 and of the Upper Jagst Railway in 1866 turned Aalen into a railway hub. Furthermore, between 1901 and its shutdown in 1972, the Härtsfeld Railway connected Aalen with Dillingen an der Donau via Neresheim. Part of becoming a rail hub entailed more jobs based on the rail industry. These included, a maintenance facility, a roundhouse, an administrative office, two track maintenance shops, and a freight station with an industrial branch line. This helped shape Aalen into what today's historians call a "railwayman's town". Starting in 1866, the utilities in town all began to be upgraded. Starting with the Aalen gasworks which were opened and gas lighting was introduced. Then in 1870, a modern water supply system was started and in 1912 the mains electricity. Finally, in 1935, the first electrically powered streetlights were installed.

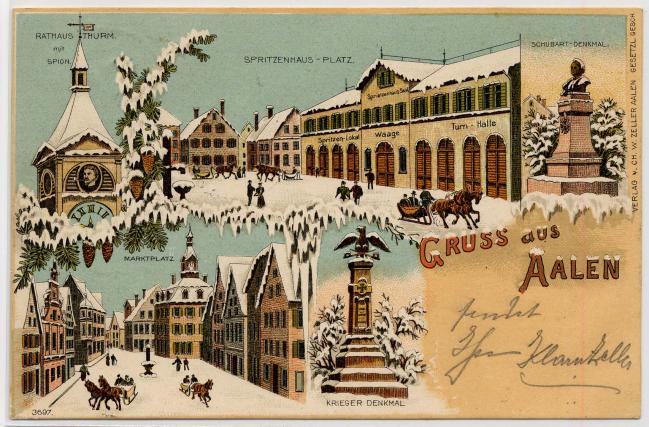
Aalen by 1900

To fight housing shortage during and immediately after World War I, the town set up barracks settlement areas at the Schlauch and Alter Turnplatz grounds. In spite of the industry being crippled by the Great Depression of 1929, the public baths at the Hirschbach creek where modernized, extended and re-opened in 1931.

==== Nazi era ====
In the federal election of 1932, the Nazi Party performed below average in Aalen with 25.8% of votes compared to 33.1% on the national level, thus finishing second to the Centre Party which had 26.6% (11.9% nationwide) of the votes, and ahead of the Social Democratic Party of Germany with 19.8% (20.4%). However, the March 1933 federal elections showed that the sentiment had changed as the Nazi Party received 34.1% (still below German average 43.9% nationwide), but by far the leading vote-getter in Aalen, followed by the Centre party at 26.6% (11.3% nationwide) and the Social Democrats 18.6% (18.3% nationwide).

The democratically elected mayor Friedrich Schwarz remained in office until the Nazis removed him from office, in 1934, and replaced him by chairman of the Nazi Party town council head and brewery owner Karl Barth. Karl Barth was a provisional mayor until the more permanent solution of Karl Schübel. In August 1934, the Nazi consumer fair Braune Messe ("brown fair") was held in Aalen.

During Nazi rule in Germany, there were many military offices constructed in Aalen, starting with, in 1936, a military district riding and driving school for Wehrkreis V. The Nazis also built an army replenishment office (Heeresverpflegungsamt), a branch arsenal office (Heeresnebenzeugamt) and a branch army ammunitions institute (Heeresnebenmunitionsanstalt).

Starting in 1935, mergers of neighbouring towns began. In 1938, the Oberamt was transformed into the Landkreis of Aalen and the municipality of Unterrombach was disbanded. Its territory was mostly added to Aalen, with the exception of Hammerstadt, which was added to the municipality of Dewangen. Forst, Rauental and Vogelsang were added to Essingen (in 1952 the entire former municipality of Unterrombach was merged into Aalen, with the exception of Forst, which is part of Essingen until present).

In September 1944, the Wiesendorf concentration camp, a subcamp of Natzweiler-Struthof, was constructed nearby. It was designated for between 200 and 300 prisoners who were utilized for forced labor in industrial businesses nearby. Until the camp's dissolution in February 1945, 60 prisoners died. Between 1946 and 1957, the camp buildings were torn down; however, its foundations are still in place in house Moltkestraße 44/46. Also, there were several other labour camps which existed where prisoners of war along with women and men from occupied countries occupied by Germany were pooled. The prisoners at these other camps had to work for the arms industry in major businesses like Schwäbische Hüttenwerke and the Alfing Keßler machine factory.

In the civic hospital, the deaconesses on duty were gradually replaced by National Socialist People's Welfare nurses. Nazi eugenics led to compulsory sterilization of some 200 persons there.

Fortunately, Aalen avoided most of the combat activity during World War II. It was only during the last weeks of the war that Aalen became a target of air warfare, which led to the destruction and severe damage of parts of the town, the train station, and other railway installations. A series of air attacks lasting for more than three weeks reached its peak on 17 April 1945, when United States Army Air Forces planes bombed the branch arsenal office and the train station. During this raid, 59 people were killed, more than half of them buried by debris, and more than 500 lost their homes. Also, 33 residential buildings, 12 other buildings and 2 bridges were destroyed, and 163 buildings, including 2 churches, were damaged. Five days later, the Nazi rulers of Aalen were unseated by the US forces.

==== Post-war era ====
Aalen became part of the State of Baden-Württemberg, upon its creation in 1952. Then, with the Baden-Württemberg territorial reform of 1973, the District of Aalen was merged into the Ostalbkreis district. Subsequently, Aalen became seat of that district, and in 1975, the town's borough attained its present size (see below).

The population of Aalen exceeded the limit of 20,000, which was the requirement for to gain the status of Große Kreisstadt ("major district town") in 1946. On 1 August 1947, Aalen was declared Unmittelbare Kreisstadt ("immediate district town"), and with the creation of the Gemeindeordnung (municipal code) of Baden-Württemberg on 1 April 1956, it was declared Große Kreisstadt.

=== Religions ===
On 31 December 2008, 51.1 percent of Aalen were members of the Catholic Church, 23.9 percent were members of the Evangelical-Lutheran Church. About 25 percent belong to other or no religious community or gave no information. The district of Waldhausen was the district with the highest percentage of Roman Catholic inhabitants at 75.6 percent, and the central district was the one with the highest percentage of Evangelical-Lutheran inhabitants at 25.6 percent, as well as those claiming no religious preference at 32.5 percent.

==== Protestantism ====
Aalen's population originally was subject to the jus patronatus of Ellwangen Abbey, and thus subject to the Roman Catholic Diocese of Augsburg.

With the assistance of the Duke of Württemberg, in 1575, the reformation was implemented in Aalen. Subsequently, Aalen has been a predominantly Protestant town for centuries, with the exception of the years from 1628 until 1632 (see reformation section). Being an Imperial City, Aalen could govern its clerical matters on its own, so Clerics, organists and choir masters were direct subjects to the council, which thus exerted bishop-like power. There was even a proper hymn book for Aalen. After the transition to Württemberg, in 1803, Aalen became seat of a deanery, with the dean church being the Town Church (with the building constructed from 1765 to 1767 and existing until present). Georg Pfäfflin was dean in Aalen (1952–1967). He carried out the parish service with great commitment, built community centers and renovated churches. When he said goodbye to Aalen, the newspaper Schwäbische Post paid tribute to him: A distinguished personality in intellectual life is leaving Aalen.

Another notable church in Aalen is St. John's Church, located on the cemetery and refurbished in 1561.

As Aalen's population grew in the 20th century, more parishes were founded: St. Mark's parish with its church building of 1967 and St. Martin's parish with its church of 1974. In the borough of Unterrombach, Aalen had implemented the reformation as well, but the community remained a chapel-of-ease of Aalen. A proper church, the Christ Church, was erected in 1912 and a proper parish was established in 1947. In Fachsenfeld, the ruling family of Woellwarth resp. of Leinroden implemented the reformation. A parish church was built in 1591, however with an influx of Catholics in the 18th century, a Catholic majority was established. The other districts of present-day Aalen remained mostly catholic after the reformation, however Wasseralfingen established a Lutheran parish in 1891 and a church, St. Magdalene's Church, in 1893. In Unterkochen, after World War II, a parish was established and a church was built in 1960. All four parishes belong to the deanery of Aalen within the Evangelical-Lutheran Church in Württemberg. Furthermore, in Aalen there are Old Pietistic communities.

==== Catholicism ====
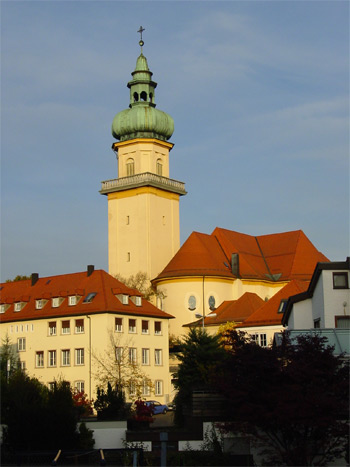
Salvator's Church

The few Catholics of today's central district were covered by the parish of Unterkochen until the 19th century, a situation which continued for some years even after completion of St. Mary's Church in 1868, which was constructed by Georg Morlok. However, in 1872 Aalen got its proper parish again, and in 1913, a second Catholic church, Salvator's Church, was completed, and in 1969 the Holy Cross Church was also finished. In 1963, a second parish was set up, and in 1972 it got a new Church, the new St. Mary's Church, which has been erected in place of the old St. Mary's church, which had been torn down in 1968. Another church of the second parish was St. Augustine's Church, which was completed in 1970. Finally, in 1976 and 1988, St. Elizabeth's Church and St. Thomas' Church were completed. Furthermore, in 1963, the St. Michael pastoral care office was built.

Hofherrnweiler has its own Catholic church, St. Boniface's, since 1904. The villages of Dewangen, Ebnat, Hofen, Waldhausen and Wasseralfingen had remained Catholic after reformation, so old parishes and churches persist there. The Assumption of Mary Church in Dewangen has an early Gothic tower and a newly built nave (1875). Mary's Immaculate Conception Church in Ebnat was constructed in 1723; however the church was first mentioned in 1298.

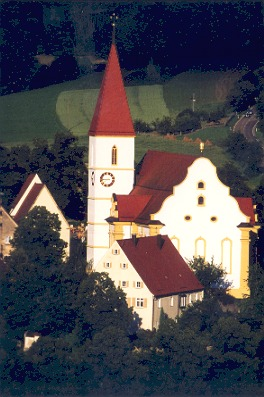
St. Mary, Unterkochen

Hofen's Saint George's Church is a fortified church, whose current nave was built between 1762 and 1775. Alongside the church, the Late Gothic St. Odile's Chapel is standing, whose entrance has the year 1462 engraved upon it. Foundations of prior buildings have been dated to the 11th and 13th century.

St. Mary's Church of Unterkochen was first mentioned in 1248, and has served the Catholics of Aalen for a long time. Waldhausen's parish church of St. Nicholas was built between 1699 and 1716. Wasseralfingen at first was a chapel of ease for Hofen, but has since had its own chapel, St. Stephen, built. It was presumably built in 1353 and remodeled in 1832. In 1834, a proper parish was established, which built a new St. Stephen's Church. This new building utilized the Romanesque Revival architecture style and was built between 1881 and 1883, and has since remained the parish's landmark. Also, Fachsenfeld received its own church, named Sacred Heart in 1895. All Catholic parishes within Aalen are today incorporated into four pastoral care units within the Ostalb Deanery of the Diocese of Rottenburg-Stuttgart; however these units also comprise some parishes outside of Aalen. Pastoral Care Unit two comprises the parishes of Essingen, Dewangen and Fachsenfeld, unit four comprises Hofen and Wasseralfingen, unit five comprises both parishes of Aalen's centre and Hofherrnweiler, unit five comprises Waldhausen, Ebnat, Oberkochen and Unterkochen.

==== Other Christian communities ====
In addition to the two major religions within Aalen, there are also free churches and other communities, including the United Methodist Church, the Baptists, the Seventh-day Adventist Church and the New Apostolic Church.

==== Other religions ====
Until the late 19th century, no Jews were documented within Aalen. In 1886 there were four Jews were living in Aalen, a number that rose to ten in 1900, fell to seven in 1905, and remained so until 1925. Upon the Nazis' rise to power in 1933, seven Jews, including two children, lived in Aalen. During the Kristallnacht in 1938, the vitrines of the three Jewish shops in the town were smashed and their proprietors imprisoned for several weeks. After their release, most Aalen Jews emigrated. The last Jews of Aalen, Fanny Kahn, was forcibly resettled to Oberdorf am Ipf, which had a large Jewish community. Today, a street of Aalen is named after her. The Jew Max Pfeffer returned from Brussels to Aalen in 1948 to continue his shop, but emigrated to Italy in 1967.

In Aalen, there is an Islamic Ditib community, which maintains the D.I.T.I.B. Mosque of Aalen (Central Mosque) located at Ulmer Straße. The mosque's construction started on 30 August 2008. The Islamist Millî Görüş organisation maintains the Fatih Mosque, as well at Ulmer Straße.

==== Mergings ====
The present-day make up of Aalen was created on 21 June 1975 by the unification of the cities of Aalen and Wasseralfingen, with the initial name of Aalen-Wasseralfingen. This annexation made Aalen's territory one third larger than its prior size. On 1 July 1975, the name Aalen was revived. Prior to this merger, the town of Aalen had already annexed the following municipalities:

- 1938: Unterrombach
- 1 January 1970: Waldhausen
- 1 July 1972: Ebnat
- 1 January 1973: Dewangen, Fachsenfeld (including the village of Hangendenbach, which was transferred from Abtsgmünd in 1954) and Unterkochen. The merging of Dewangen nearly doubled the territory of Aalen.

=== Population's progression and structure ===
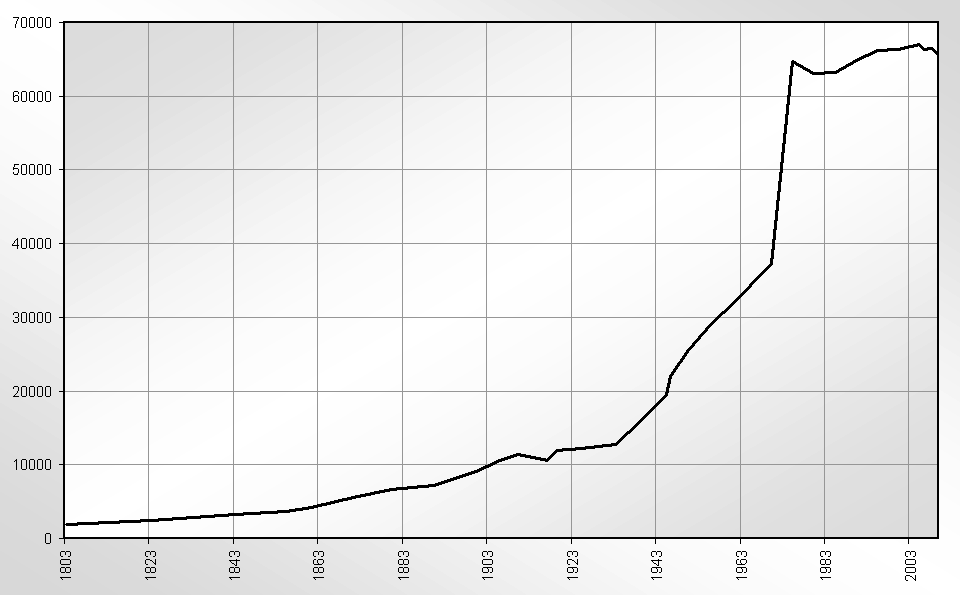
Progression of Aalen's population

During the Middle Ages and the early modern period, Aalen was just a small town with a few hundred inhabitants. The population grew slowly due to numerous wars, famines and epidemics. It was the beginning of the Industrial Revolution in the 19th century where Aalen's growth accelerated. Whereas in 1803, only 1,932 people inhabited the town, in 1905 it had already increased to 10,442. The number continued to rise and reached 15,890 in 1939.

The influx of refugees and ethnic Germans from Germany's former eastern territories after World War II pushed the population to 31,814 in 1961. The merger with Wasseralfingen on 21 June 1975 added 14,597 persons and resulted in a total population of 65,165 people. On 30 June 2005, the population, which was officially determined by the Statistical Office of Baden-Württemberg, was 67,125.

The following overview shows how the population figures of the borough were ascertained. Until 1823, the figures are mostly estimates, thereafter census results or official updates by the state statistical office. Starting in 1871, the figures were determined by non-uniform method of tabulation using extrapolation.

Year	Inhabitants
1634	2,000
1803	1,932
1823	2,486
3 December 1843 ¹	3,319
3 December 1855 ¹	3,720
3 December 1861 ¹	4,272
1 December 1871 ¹	5,552
1 December 1880 ¹	6,659
1 December 1890 ¹	7,155
1 December 1900 ¹	9,058
1 December 1905 ¹	10,442

Year	Inhabitants
1 December 1910 ¹	11,347
1 December 1916 ¹	10,655
5 December 1917 ¹	10,551
8 October 1919 ¹	11,978
16 June 1925 ¹	12,171
16 June 1933 ¹	12,703
17 May 1939 ¹	15,890
31 December 1945	19,552
29 October 1946 ¹	21,941
13 September 1950 ¹	25,375
25 September 1956 ¹	29,360

Year	Inhabitants
6 June 1961 ¹	31,814
31 December 1965	34,373
27 May 1970 ¹	37,366
31 December 1975	64,735
31 December 1980	63,030
31 December 1985	63,195
31 December 1990	64,781
1994	66,330
31 December 1995	66,234
31 December 2000	66,373
31 December 2005	67,066
31 December 2010	66,113

¹ Census result

On 31 December 2008, Aalen had precisely 66,058 inhabitants, of which 33,579 were female and 32,479 were male. The average age of Aalen's inhabitants rose from 40.5 years in 2000 to 42.4 in 2008. Within the borough, 6,312 foreigners resided, which is 9.56 percent. Of them, the largest percentage are from Turkey (38 percent of all foreigners), the second largest group are from Italy (13 percent), followed by Croatians (6 percent) and Serbs (5 percent).

The number of married residents fell from 32,948 in 1996 to 31,357 in 2007, while the number of divorced residents rose in the same period from 2,625 to 3,859. The number of single residents slightly increased between 1996 and 2004 from 25,902 to 26,268 and fell slightly until 2007 to 26,147. The number of widowed residents fell from 5,036 in 1996 to 4,783 in 2007.

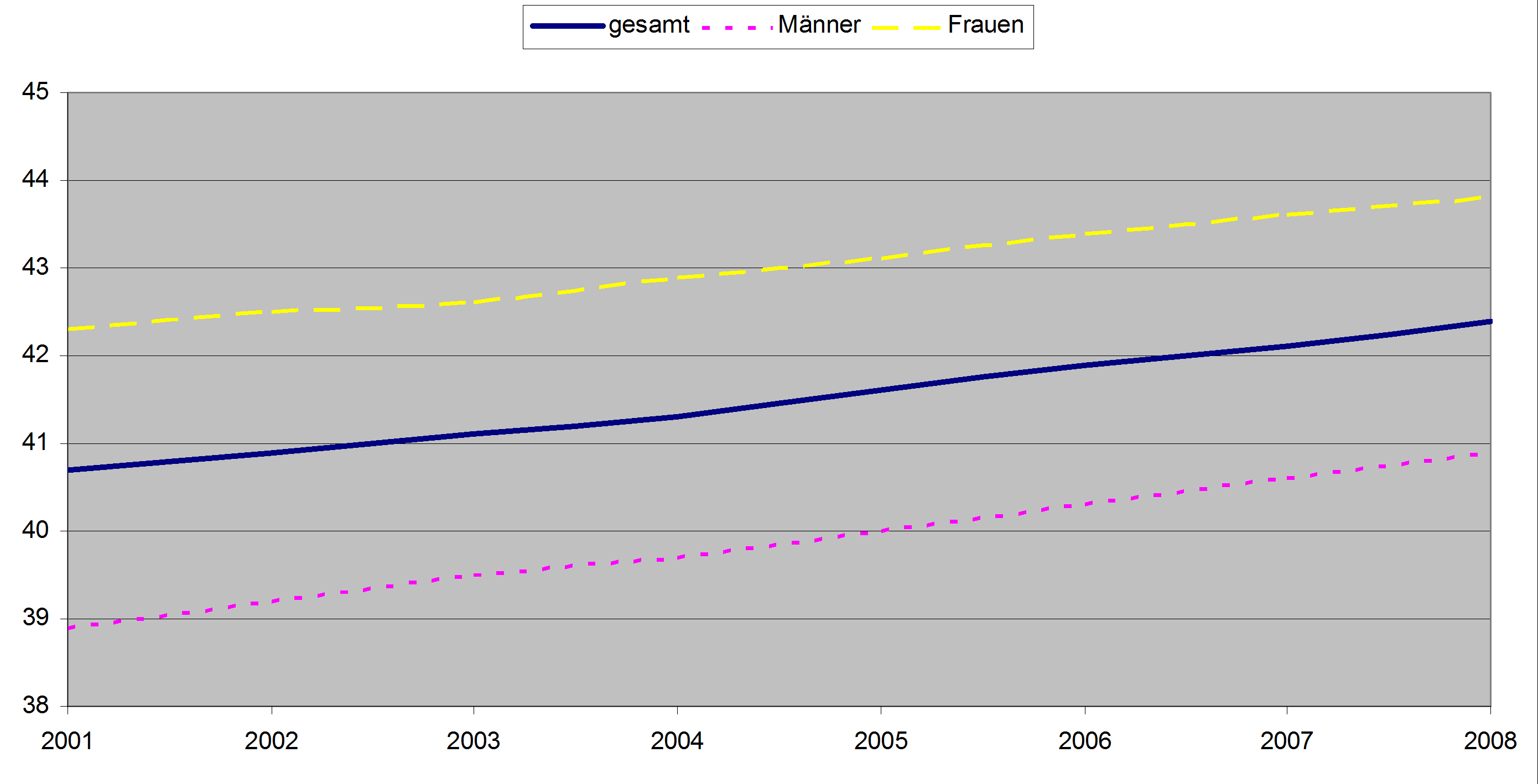
Average age of Aalen's inhabitants

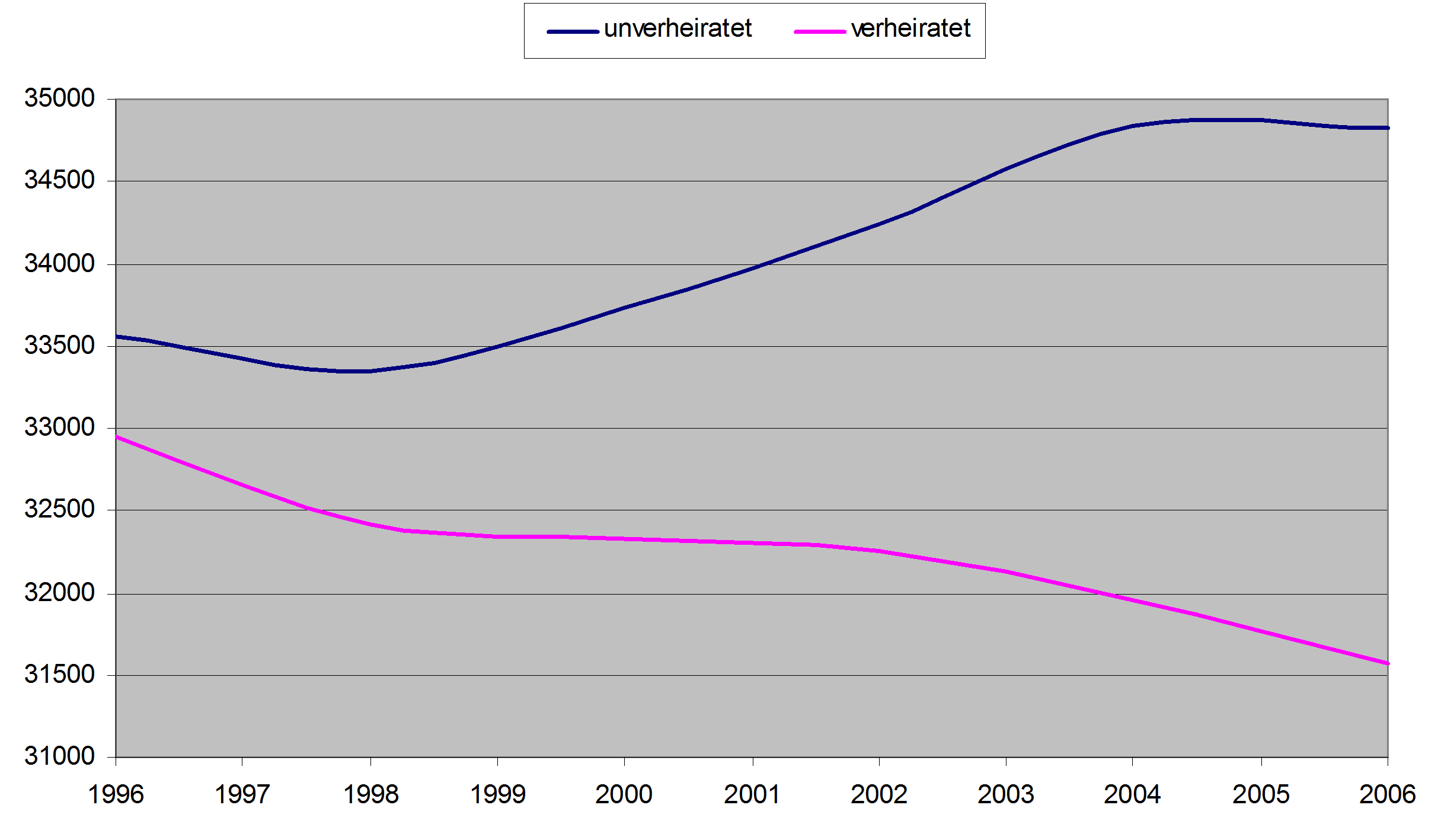
Ratio of married inhabitants contrasted to unmarried

== Politics ==
Aalen has arranged a municipal association with Essingen and Hüttlingen.

=== Council ===
Since the local election of 25 May 2014, the town council consists of 51 representatives having a term of five years. The seats are distributed as follows on parties and groups (changes refer to the second last election of 2004):

Distribution of seats in the council since 2014

Town council since 2014
Parliamentary group	Election result	±	Strength	±
CDU	37,4%	+1,2 Pp.	19 Sitze	−2
SPD	22,9%	−0,5 Pp.	11 Sitze	–2
Alliance 90/The Greens	15,6%	–0,1 Pp.	8 Sitze	–1
Free Voters Aalen	11,5%	+11,5 Pp.	6 Sitze	+6
The Left/Pro Aalen	7,3%	–0,3 Pp.	4 Sitze	+1
FDP/FW	3,4%	–10,4 Pp.	2 Sitze	–5
Active Citizens (Aktive Bürger)	1,9%	−1,5 Pp.	1 Sitz	0

=== Mayors ===
Since 1374, the mayor and the council maintain the government of the town. In the 16th century, the town had two, sometimes three mayors, and in 1552, the council had 13 members. Later, the head of the administration was reorganized several times. In the Württemberg era, the mayor's title was initially called Bürgermeister, then from 1819 it was Schultheiß, and since 1947 it is Oberbürgermeister. The mayor is elected for a term of eight years, and he is chairman and a voting member of the council. He has one deputy with the official title of Erster Bürgermeister ("first mayor") and one with the official title of Bürgermeister ("mayor").

Flag of Aalen

Heads of town in Aalen since 1802

- 1802–: Theodor Betzler
- 1812–1819: Ludwig Hölder
- 1819–1829: Theodor Betzler
- 1829: Palm
- 1829–1848: Philipp Ehmann
- 1848–1873: Gustav Oesterlein
- 1873–1900: Julius Bausch
- 1900–1902: Paul Maier
- 1903–1934: Friedrich Schwarz
- 1935–1945: Karl Schübel (NSDAP)
- 1945–1950: Otto Balluff
- 1950–1975: Karl Schübel (independent)
- 1976–2005: Ulrich Pfeifle (SPD)
- 2005–2013: Martin Gerlach (independent)
- 2013–2021: Thilo Rentschler (SPD)
- 2021–: Frederick Brütting (SPD)

=== Coat of arms and flag ===
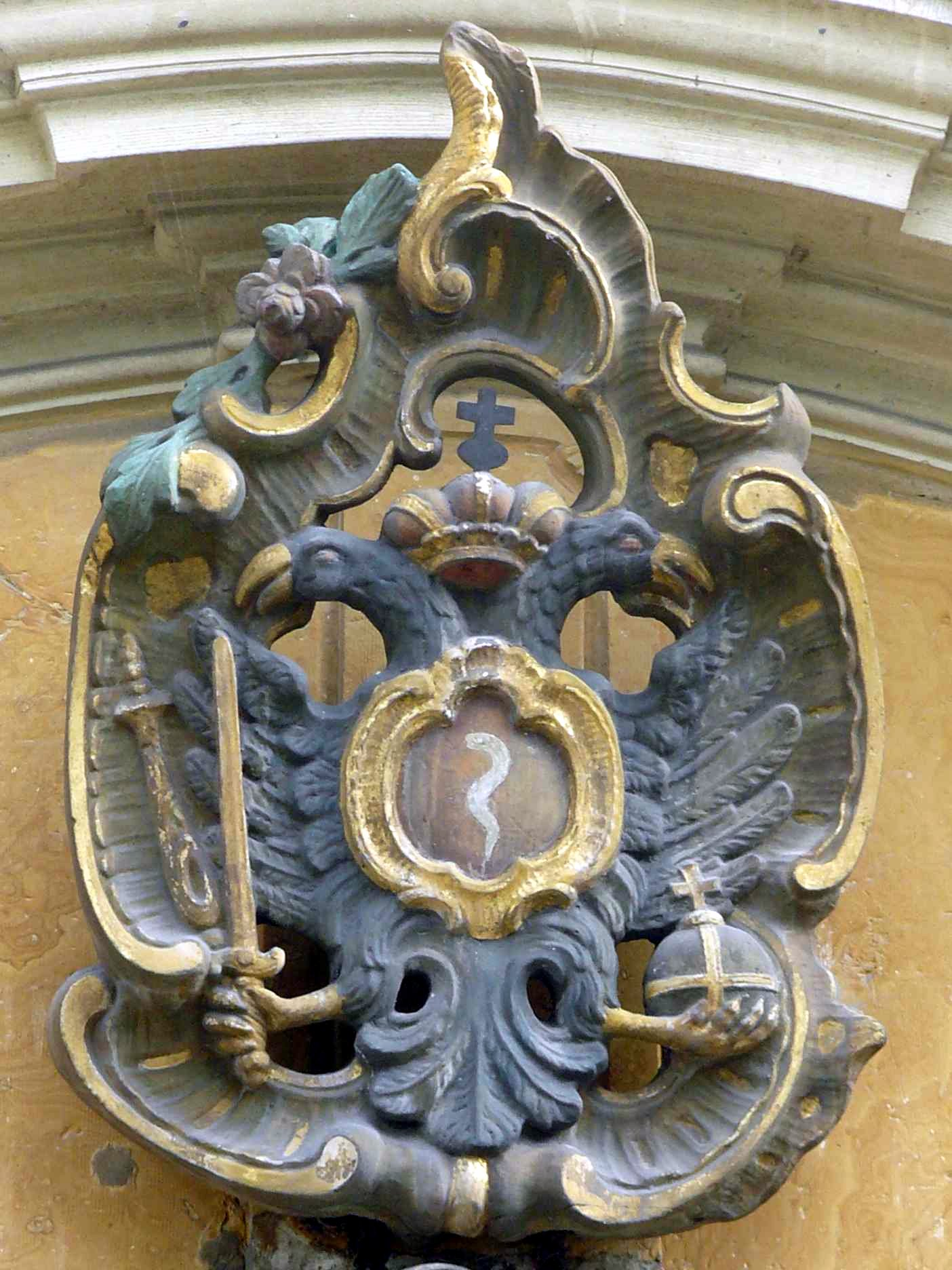
Coat of arms of 1766 with eagle and eel

Aalen's coat of arms depicts a black eagle with a red tongue on golden background, having a red shield on its breast with a bent silver eel on it. Eagle and eel were first acknowledged as Aalen's heraldic animals in the seal of 1385, with the eagle representing the town's imperial immediacy. After the territorial reform, it was bestowed again by the Administrative District of Stuttgart on 16 November 1976.

The coat of arms' blazon reads: "In gold, the black imperial eagle, with a red breast shield applied to it, therein a bent silver eel" (In Gold der schwarze Reichsadler, belegt mit einem roten Brustschild, darin ein gekrümmter silberner Aal).

Aalen's flag is striped in red and white and contains the coat of arms.

The origin of the town's name is uncertain. Matthäus Merian (1593–1650) presumed the name to originate from its location at the Kocher river, where "frequently eels are caught", while Aal is German for "eel". Other explanations point to Aalen as the garrison of an ala during the Roman empire, respectively to an abridgement of the Roman name "Aquileia" as a potential name of the Roman fort, a name that nearby Heidenheim an der Brenz bore as well. Another interpretation points to a Celtic word aa meaning "water".

=== Godparenthood ===
On the occasion of the 1980 Reichsstädter Tage, Aalen took over godparenthood for the more than 3000 ethnic Germans displaced from the Wischau linguistic enclave. 972 of them settled in Aalen in 1946. The "Wischau Linguistic Enclave Society" (Gemeinschaft Wischauer Sprachinsel) regularly organises commemorative meetings in Aalen. Their traditional costumes are stored in the Old Town Hall.

=== Municipal finances ===
According to the 2007 municipal poll by the Baden-Württemberg chapter of the German Taxpayers Federation, municipal tax revenues totalling to 54,755 million Euros (2006) resp. 62,148 million Euros (2007) face the following debts:

- 2006 total: 109.9 million Euros debts (64.639 million of the finance department and 48.508 million of the municipal enterprises and fund assets)
- 2007 total: 114.5 million Euros debts (69.448 million of the finance department and 45.052 million of the municipal enterprises and fund assets)

== Twin towns – sister cities ==
Aalen is twinned with:

- Saint-Lô, France (1978)
- (England) Christchurch, United Kingdom (1981)
- Tatabánya, Hungary (1987)
- Antakya, Turkey (1995); initiated by Ismail Demirtas, who emigrated in 1962 from Turkey to Aalen and was social adviser for foreign employees
- Cervia, Italy (2011)
- Vilankulo, Mozambique (2018)

The "Twin Towns Society of Aalen" (Städtepartnerschaftsverein Aalen e. V.) promotes friendly relations between Aalen and its twin towns, which comprises mutual exchanges of sports and cultural clubs, schools and other civic institutions. On the occasion of the Reichsstädter Tage, from 11 until 13 September 2009 the first conference of twin towns was held.

== Culture and sights ==
=== Theatre ===
The Theater der Stadt Aalen theatre was founded in 1991 and stages 400 to 500 performances a year.

=== Schubart Literary Award ===
The town endowed the "Schubart Literary Award" (Schubart-Literaturpreis) in 1955 in tribute to Christian Friedrich Daniel Schubart, who spent his childhood and youth in Aalen. It is one of the earliest literary awards in Baden-Württemberg and is awarded biennially to German-language writers whose work coincide with Schubart's "liberal and enlightened reasoning". It is compensated with 12,000 Euros.

=== Music ===
Founded in 1958, the "Music School of the Town of Aalen" today has about 1,500 students taught by 27 music instructors in 30 subjects. In 1977, a symphony orchestra was founded in Aalen, which today is called Aalener Sinfonieorchester, and consists mostly of instructors and students of the music school. It performs three public concerts annually: The "New Year's Concert" in January, the "Symphony Concert" in July and a "Christmas Concert" in December. Beyond that, music festivals regularly take place in Aalen, like the Aalen Jazzfest.

The Aalen volunteer fire department has had a marching band since 1952, whose roots date back to 1883. In 1959, the band received its first glockenspiel from TV host Peter Frankenfeld on the occasion of a TV appearance.

A famous German rapper, designer and singer, that goes under the name of Cro, was born in Aalen and lived his early years here.

=== Arts ===
The Kunstverein Aalen was founded in 1983 as a non-profit art association and today is located in the Old Town Hall. The institution with more than 400 members focuses on solo and group exhibitions by international artists. It belongs to the Arbeitsgemeinschaft Deutscher Kunstvereine (ADKV), an umbrella organization for non-profit art associations.

=== Museums and memorial sites ===
==== Museums ====
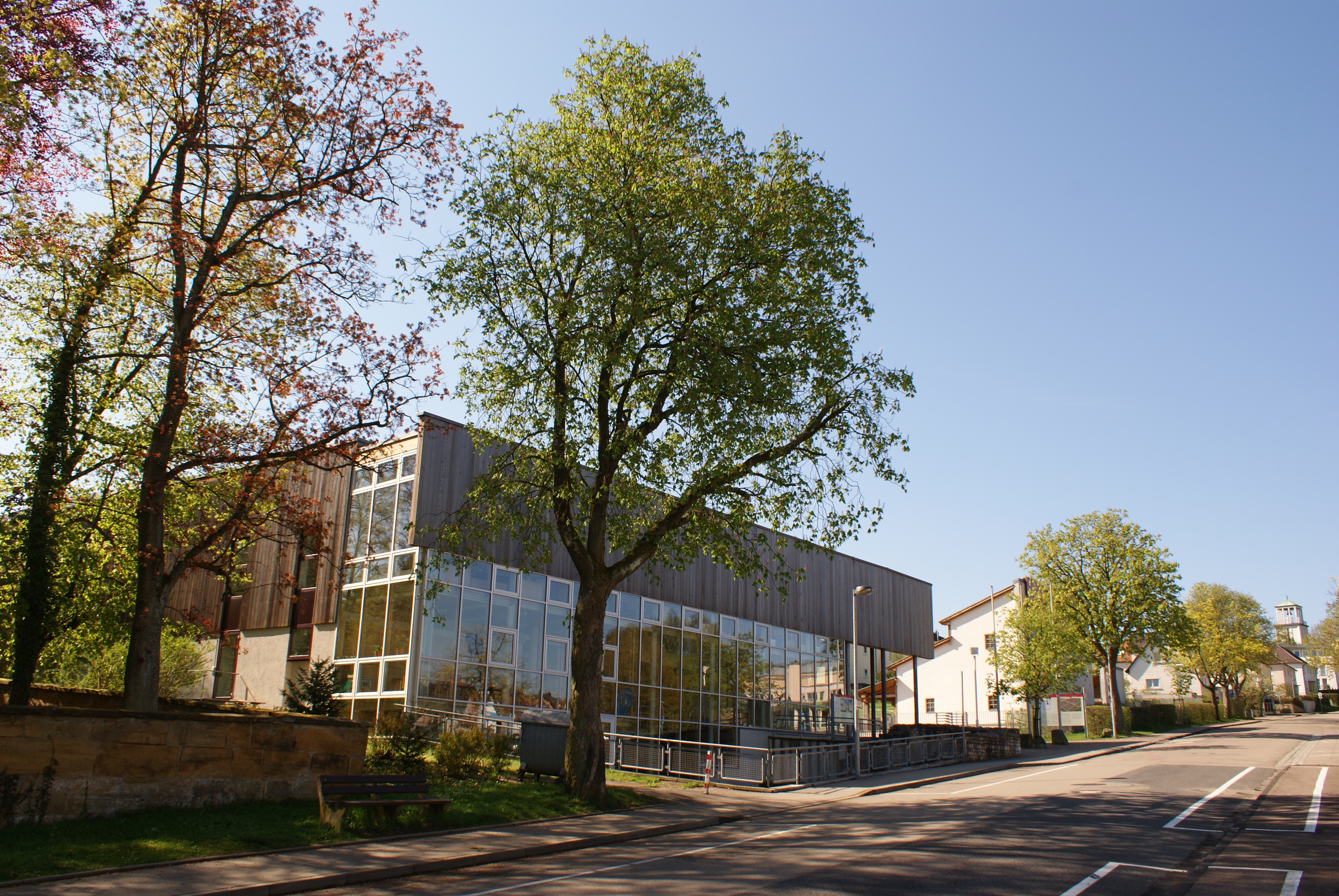
Aalen Limes Museum, exterior view

In the central district of Aalen, there are two museums: The "Aalen Limes Museum" (Limesmuseum Aalen) is located at the place of the largest Roman cavalry fort north of the Alps until about 200 AD. It opened in 1964. The museum exhibits numerous objects from the Roman era. The ruins of the cavalry fort located beside the museum is open to museum visitors. Every other year, a Roman festival is held in the area of the museum (see below).

In the Geological-Paleontological Museum located in the historic town hall, there are more than 1500 fossils from the Swabian Jura, including ammonites, ichthyosaurs and corals, displayed.

In the Waldhausen district the Heimatstüble museum of local history has an exhibition on agriculture and rural living.

In the Wasseralfingen district, there are two more museums: The Museum Wasseralfingen comprises a local history exhibition and an art gallery including works of Hermann Plock, Helmut Schuster and Sieger Köder. Also, the stove plate collection of the Schwäbische Hüttenwerke steel mill is exhibited, with artists, modellers and the production sequence of a cast plate from design to final product being presented.

==== Memorial sites ====
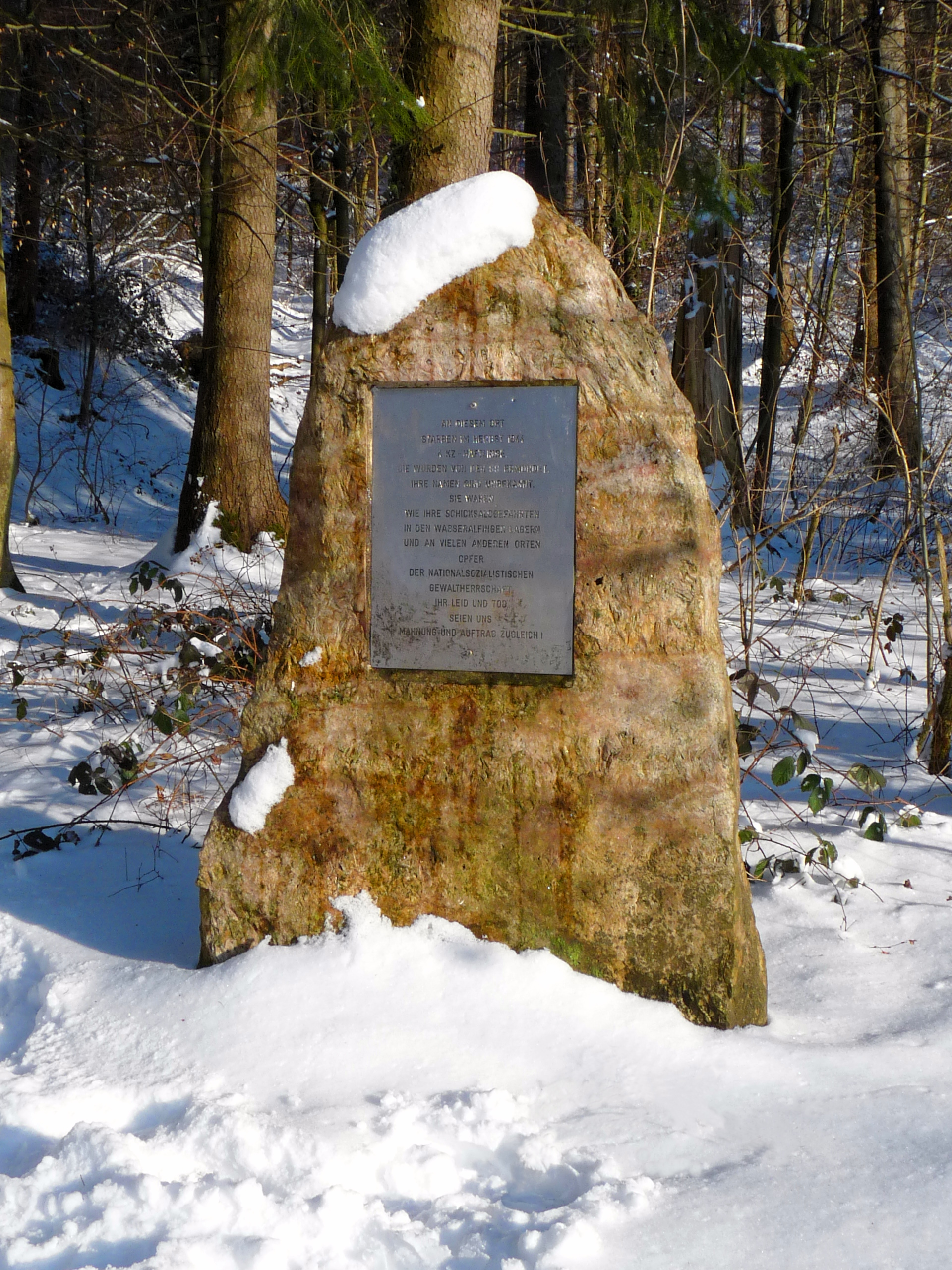
Memorial stone at Schillerlinde

There is memorial stone at the Schillerlinde tree above Wasseralfingen's ore pit dedicated to four prisoners of the subcamp of Natzweiler-Struthof concentration camp killed there. Also in Wasseralfingen, in the cemetery a memorial with the Polish inscription "To the victims of Hitler" which commemorates the deceased forced labourers buried there.

In 1954, on the Schillerhöhe hill the town erected a bell tower as a memorial to Aalen's victims of both world wars and to the displacement of ethnic Germans. The tower was planned by Emil Leo, the bell was endowed by Carl Schneider. The tower is open on request. Every evening at 18:45 (before 2003: at 19:45), the memorial's bell rings.

=== Buildings ===
==== Churches ====
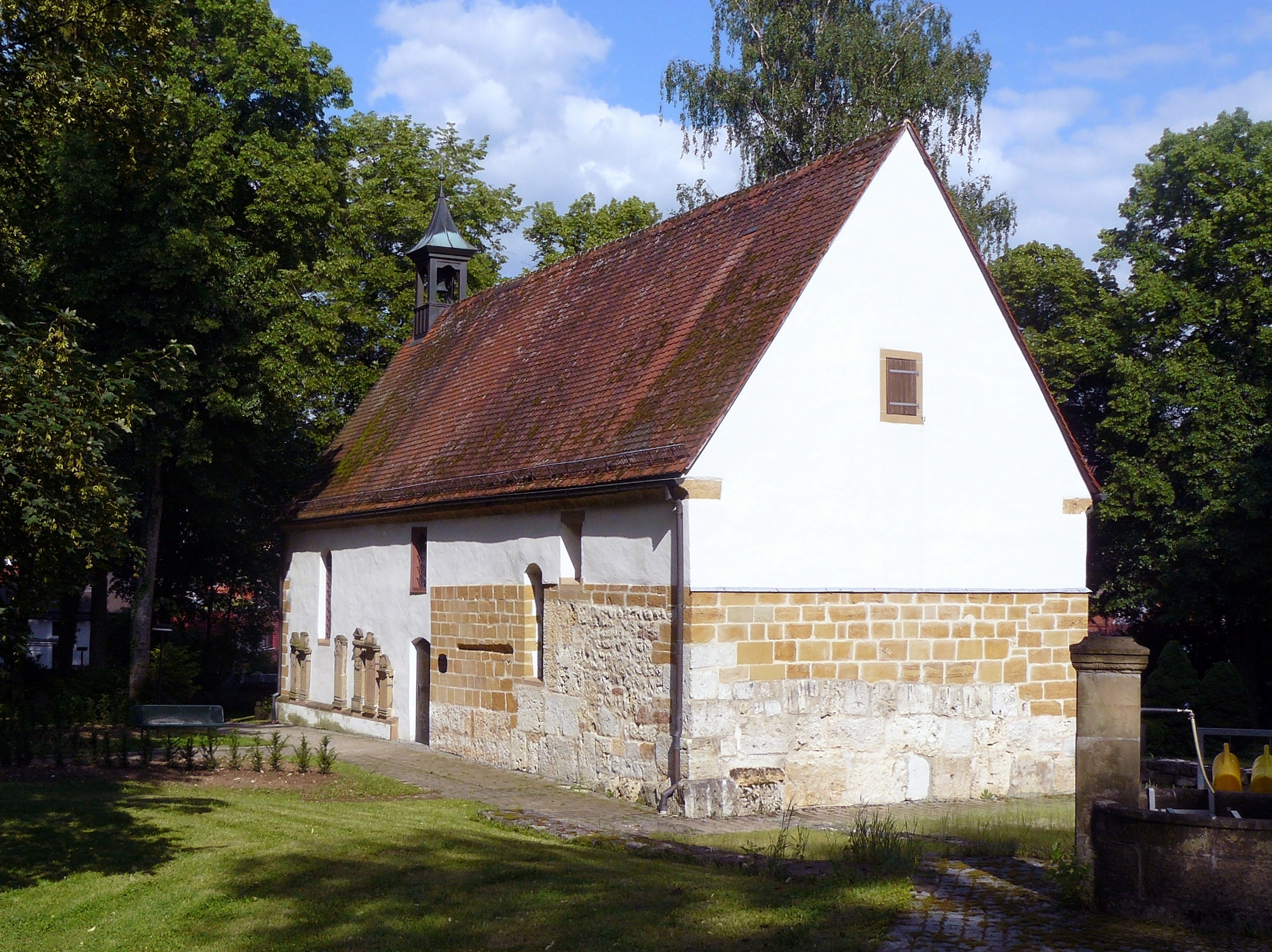
St. John's Church

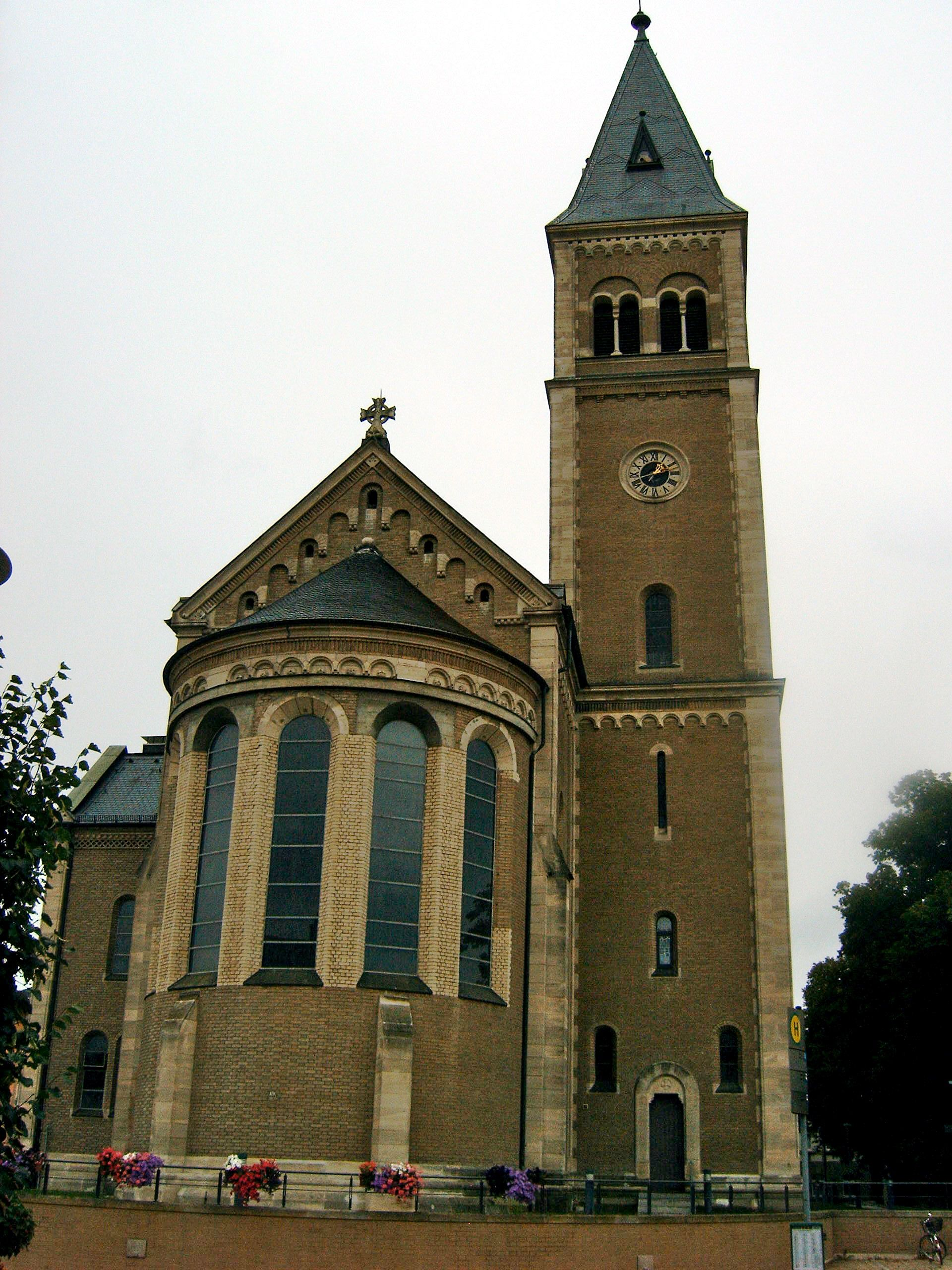
St. Stephen's Church, Wasseralfingen

The town centre is dominated by the Evangelical-Lutheran St. Nicholas' Church in the heart of the pedestrian area. The church, in its present shape being built between 1765 and 1767, is the only major Late Baroque building in Aalen and is the main church of the Evangelical-Lutheran parish of Aalen.

St. John's Church is located inside of St. John's cemetery in the western centre. The building presumably is from the 9th century and thus is one of Württemberg's oldest existing churches. The interior features frescos from the early 13th century.

For other churches in Aalen, see the Religions section.

==== Historic Town Hall with "Spy" ====
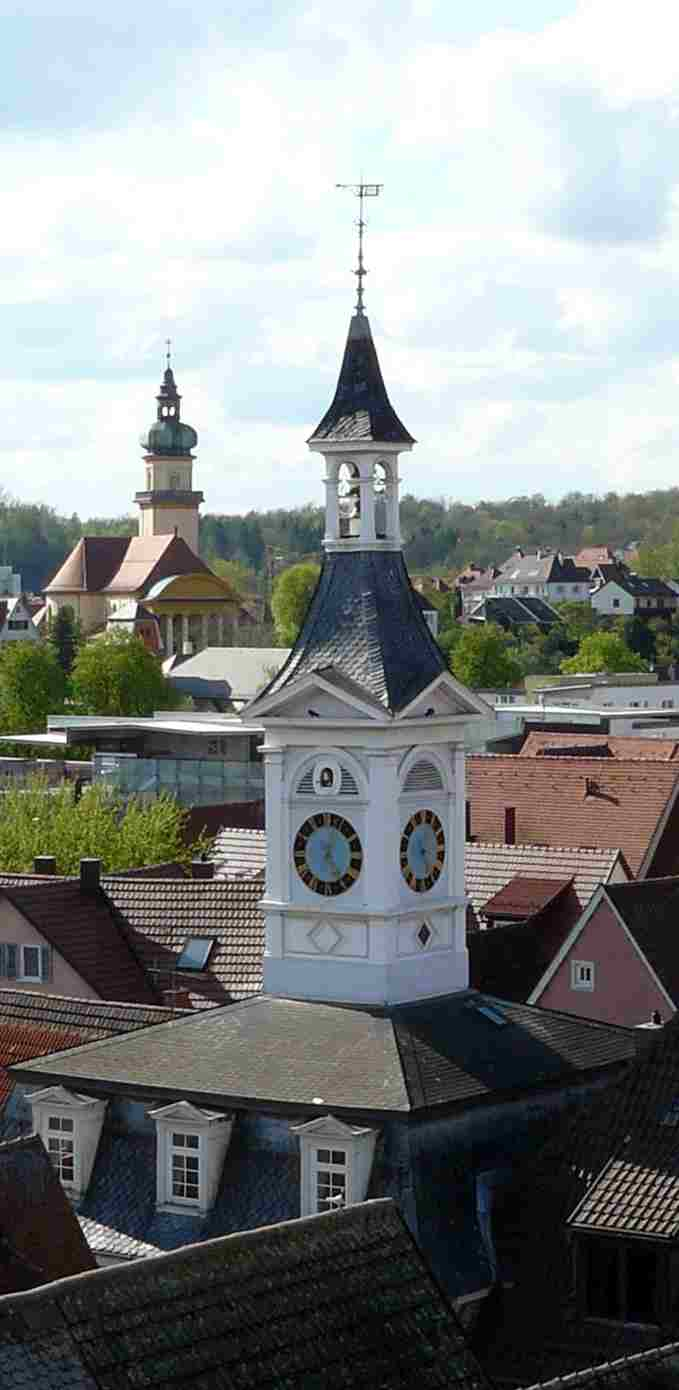
"Spy's Tower"

The Historic Town Hall was originally built in the 14th century. After the fire of 1634, it was re-constructed in 1636. This building received a clock from Lauterburg, and the Imperial City of Nuremberg donated a Carillon. It features a figurine of the "Spy of Aalen" and historically displayed other figurines, however the latter ones were lost by a fire in 1884. Since then, the Spy resides inside the reconstructed tower and has become a symbol of the town. The building was used as the town hall until 1907. Since 1977, the Geological-Paleontological Museum resides in the Historic Town Hall.

According to legend, the citizens of Aalen owe the "Spy of Aalen" (Spion von Aalen) their town having been spared from destruction by the emperor's army:

The Imperial City of Aalen was once in quarrel with the emperor, and his army was shortly before the gates to take the town. The people of Aalen got scared and thus dispatched their "most cunning" one out into the enemy's camp to spy out the strength of their troops. Without any digression, he went straight into the middle of the enemy camp, which inescapably led to him being seized and presented to the emperor. When the emperor asked him what he had lost here, he answered in Swabian German: "Don't frighten, high lords, I just want to peek how many cannons and other war things you've got, since I am the spy of Aalen". The emperor laughed upon such a blatancy and acted naïvety, steered him all through the camp and then sent him back home. Soon the emperor withdrew with his army as he thought a town such wise guys reside in deserved being spared.

==== Old Town Hall ====
The earliest record of the Old Town Hall was in 1575. Its outside wall features the oldest known coat of arms, which is of 1664. Until 1851, the building also housed the Krone-Post hotel, which coincided with being a station of the Thurn und Taxis postal company. It has housed many notable persons. Thus the so-called "Napoleon Window" with its "N" painted on reminds of the stay of French emperor Napoleon Bonaparte in 1805. According to legend, he rammed his head so hard it bled on this window, when he was startled by the noise of his soldiers ridiculing the "Spy of Aalen". The building was used as Aalen's town hall from 1907 until 1975. Today it houses a cabaret café and the stage of the Theatre of the Town of Aalen. The town has adopted the Wischau Linguistic Enclave Society due to their godparenthood and stores their traditional costumes in the building.

==== Bürgerspital ====
The Bürgerspital ("Civic Asylum") is a timber-frame house erected on Spritzenhausplatz ("Fire Engine House Square") in 1702. Until 1873, it was used as civic hospital, then, later as a retirement home. After a comprehensive renovation in 1980 it was turned into a senior citizen's community centre.

==== Limes-Thermen ====
On a slope of the Langert mountain, south of the town, the Limes-Thermen ("Limes Thermae") hot springs are located. They were built in ancient Roman style and opened in 1985. The health spa is supplied with water about 34 to 36 °C (93 to 97 °F).

==== Market square ====
The market square is the historic hub of Aalen and runs along about 150 metres (490 ft) from the town hall in the south to the Historic Town Hall and the Old Town Hall in the north, where it empties into Radgasse alley. Since 1809, it is site of the weekly market on Wednesday and Saturday. About 10 metres (33 ft) in front of the Reichsstädter Brunnen fountain at the town hall, the coats of arms of Aalen, its twinned cities and of the Wischau linguistic enclave are paved into the street as mosaic.

===== Market fountain =====
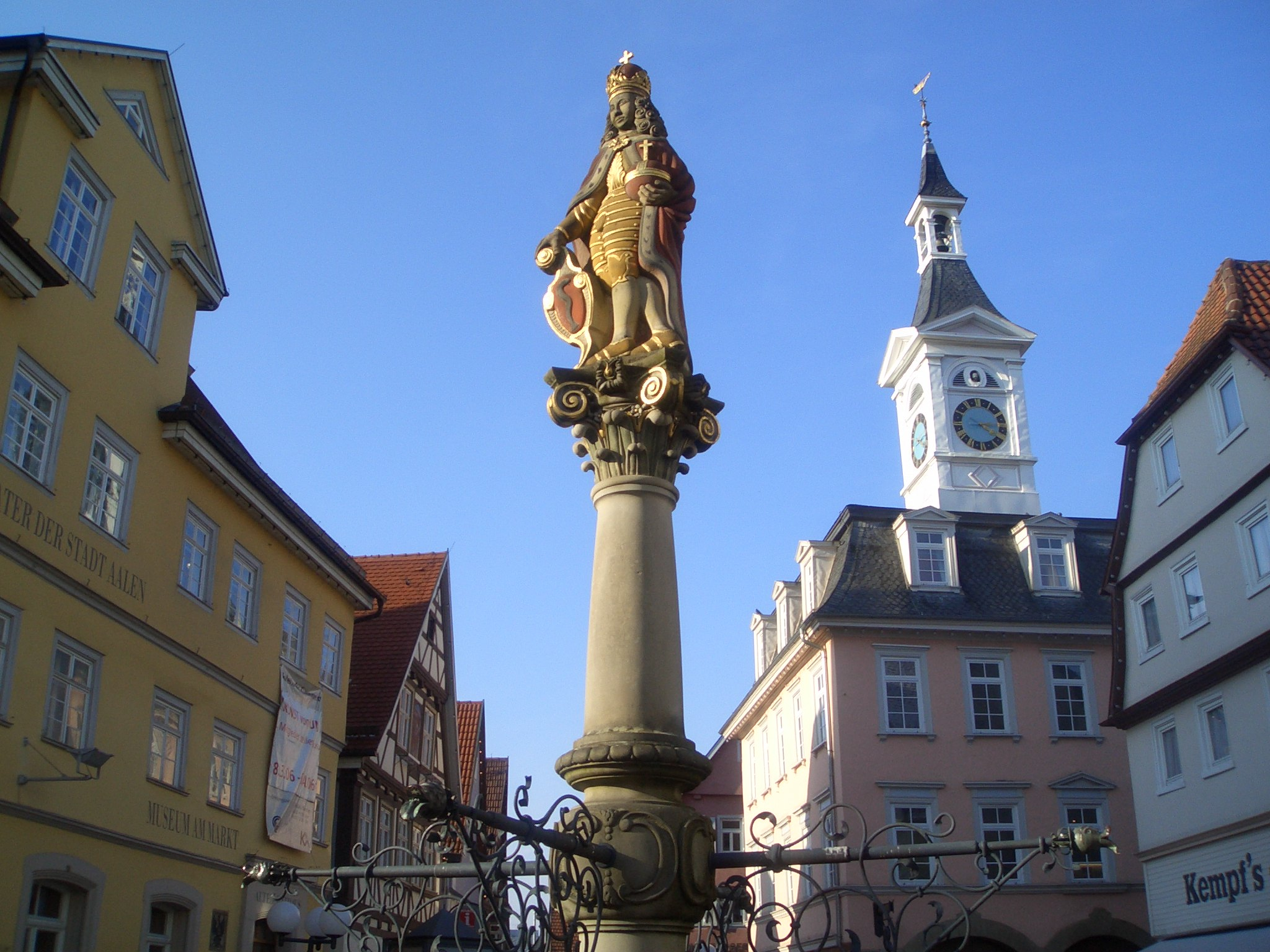
Statue depicting Joseph I at the market fountain

In 1705, for the water supply of Aalen a well casing was erected at the northern point of the market square, in front of the Historic Town Hall. It was a present of duke Eberhard Louis. The fountain bore a statue of emperor Joseph I., who was enthroned in 1705 and in 1707 renewed Aalen's Imperial City privileges. The fountain was supplied via a wooden pipe. Excessive water was dissipated through ditches branched from Kocher river. When in the early 1870s Aalen's water network was constructed, the fountain was replaced by a smaller fountain about 100 metres (330 ft) distant. In 1975, the old market fountain was re-erected in baroque style. It bears a replica of the emperor's statue, with the original statue exhibited in the new town hall's lobby. The cast iron casing plates depict the 1718 coat of arms of the Duchy of Württemberg and the coats of arms of Aalen and of the merged municipalities.

===== Reichsstädter Brunnen =====
The Reichsstädter Brunnen fountain ("Imperial Civic Fountain") is located in front of the town hall at the southern point of the market square. It was created by sculptor Fritz Nuss in 1977 to commemorate Aalen's time as an Imperial City (1360–1803). On its circumference is a frieze showing bronze figurines illustrating the town's history.

==== Radgasse ====
The Radgasse ("Wheel Alley") features Aalen's oldest façade. Originally a small pond was on its side. The buildings were erected between 1659 and 1662 for peasants with citizenry privileges and renovated in the mid-1980s. The namesake for the alley was the "Wheel" tavern, which was to be found at the site of today's address Radgasse 15.

==== Tiefer Stollen ====
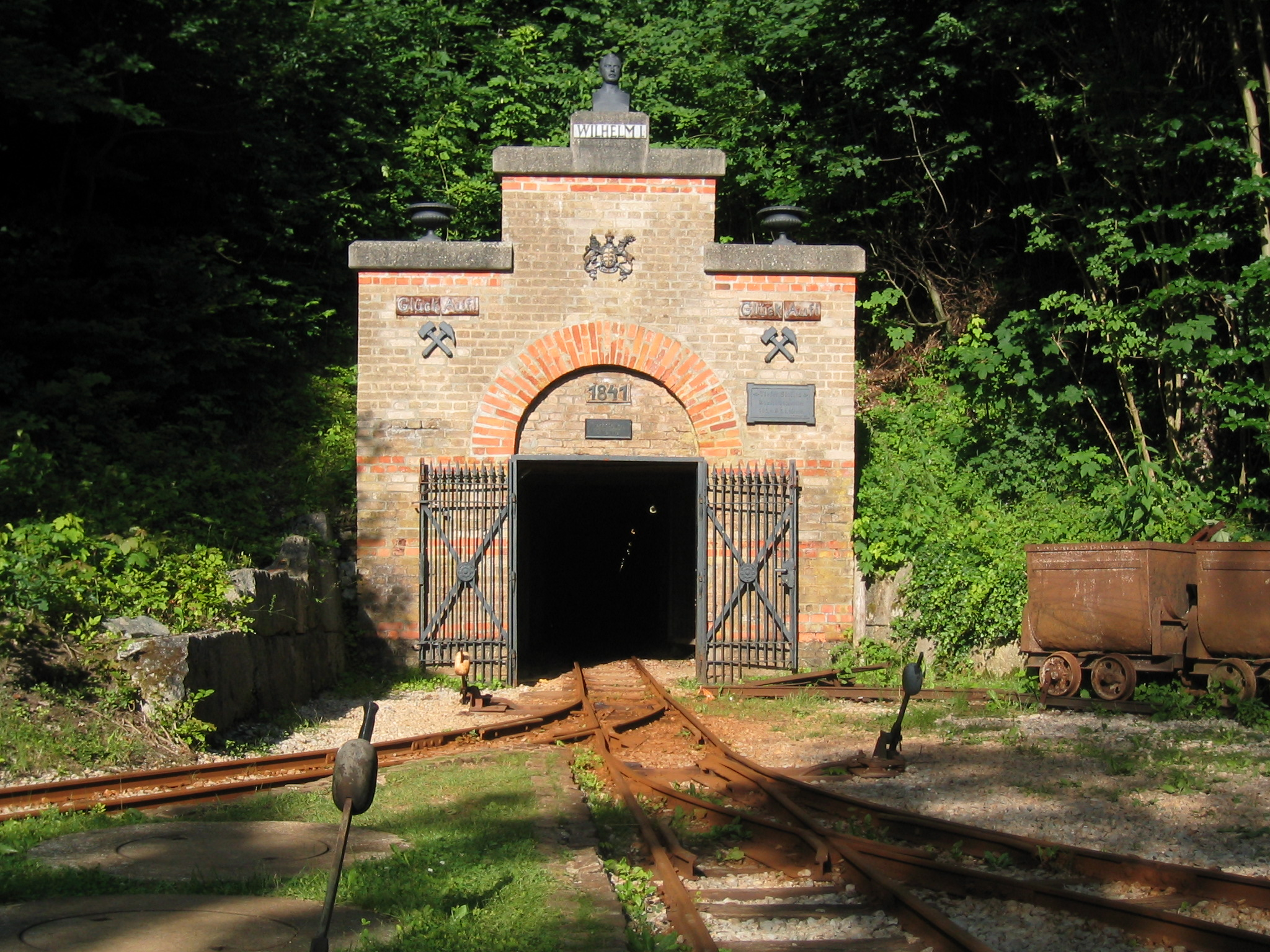
Tiefer Stollen tourist mine

The former iron ore pit Wilhelm at Braunenberg hill was converted into the Tiefer Stollen tourist mine in order to remind of the old-day miners' efforts and to maintain it as a memorial of early industrialisation in the Aalen area. It has a mining museum open for visitors, and a mine railway takes visitors deep into the mountain. The Town of Aalen, a sponsorship association, and many citizens volunteered several thousand hours of labour to put the mine into its current state. As far as possible, things were left in the original state. In 1989, a sanitary gallery was established where respiratory diseases are treated within rest cures. Thus the Aalen village of Röthard, where the gallery is located, was awarded the title of "Place with sanitary gallery service" in 2004.

==== Observatory ====
The Aalen Observatory was built in 1969 as school observatory for the Schubart Gymnasium. In 2001, it was converted to a public observatory. Since then, it has been managed by the Astronomische Arbeitsgemeinschaft Aalen ("Aalen Astronomical Society"). It is located on Schillerhöhe hill and features two refractive telescopes. They were manufactured by Carl Zeiss AG which has its headquarters in nearby Oberkochen and operates a manufacturing works in Aalen (see below). In the observatory, guided tours and lectures are held regularly.

==== Windpark Waldhausen ====
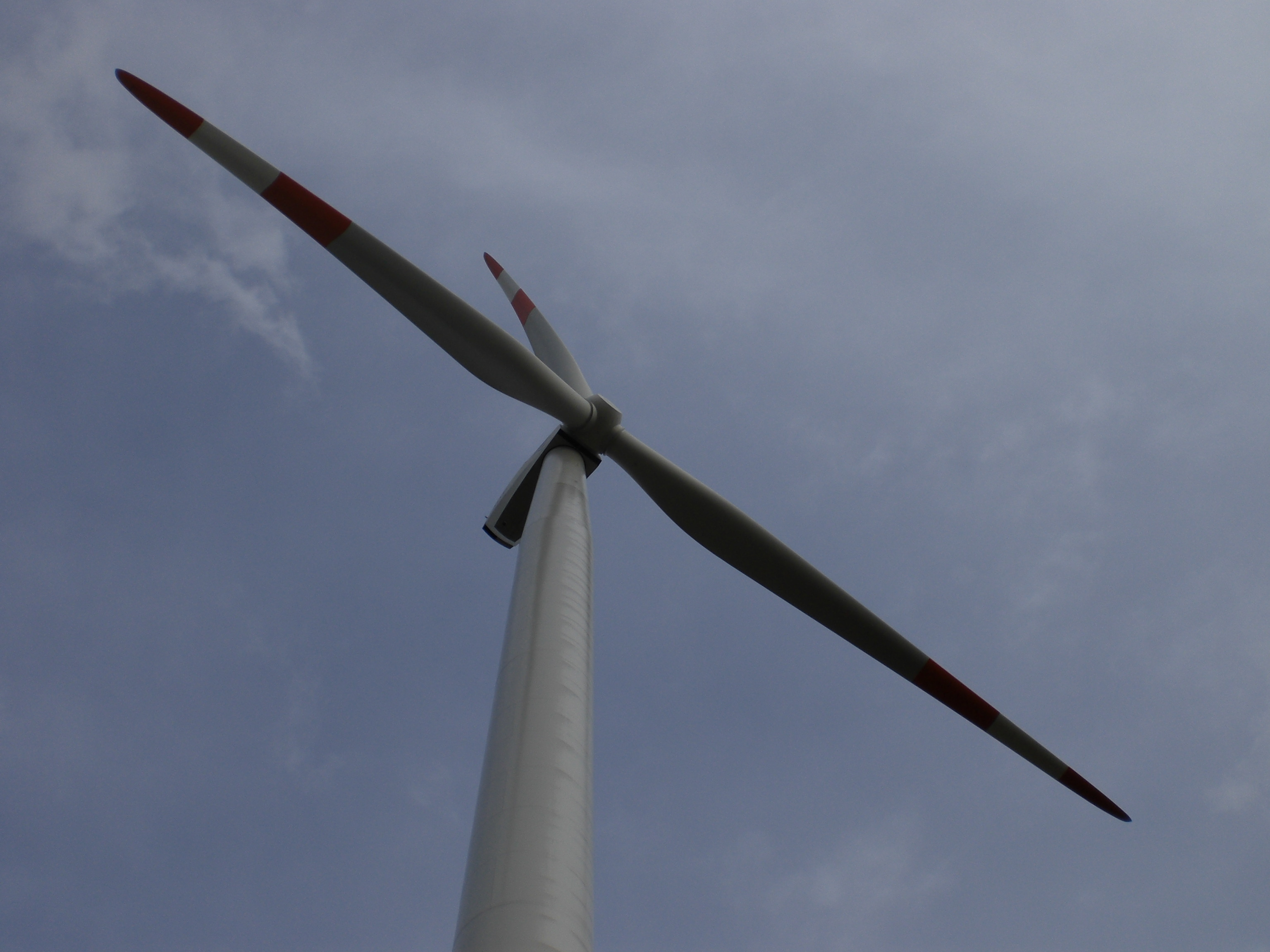
Wind turbine at Windpark Waldhausen

The Windpark Waldhausen wind farm began operations in early 2007. It consists of seven REpower MM92 wind turbines with a nameplate capacity of 2 MW each. The hub height of each wind turbine is 100 metres (330 ft), with a rotor diameter of 92 metres (302 ft).

==== Aalbäumle observation tower ====
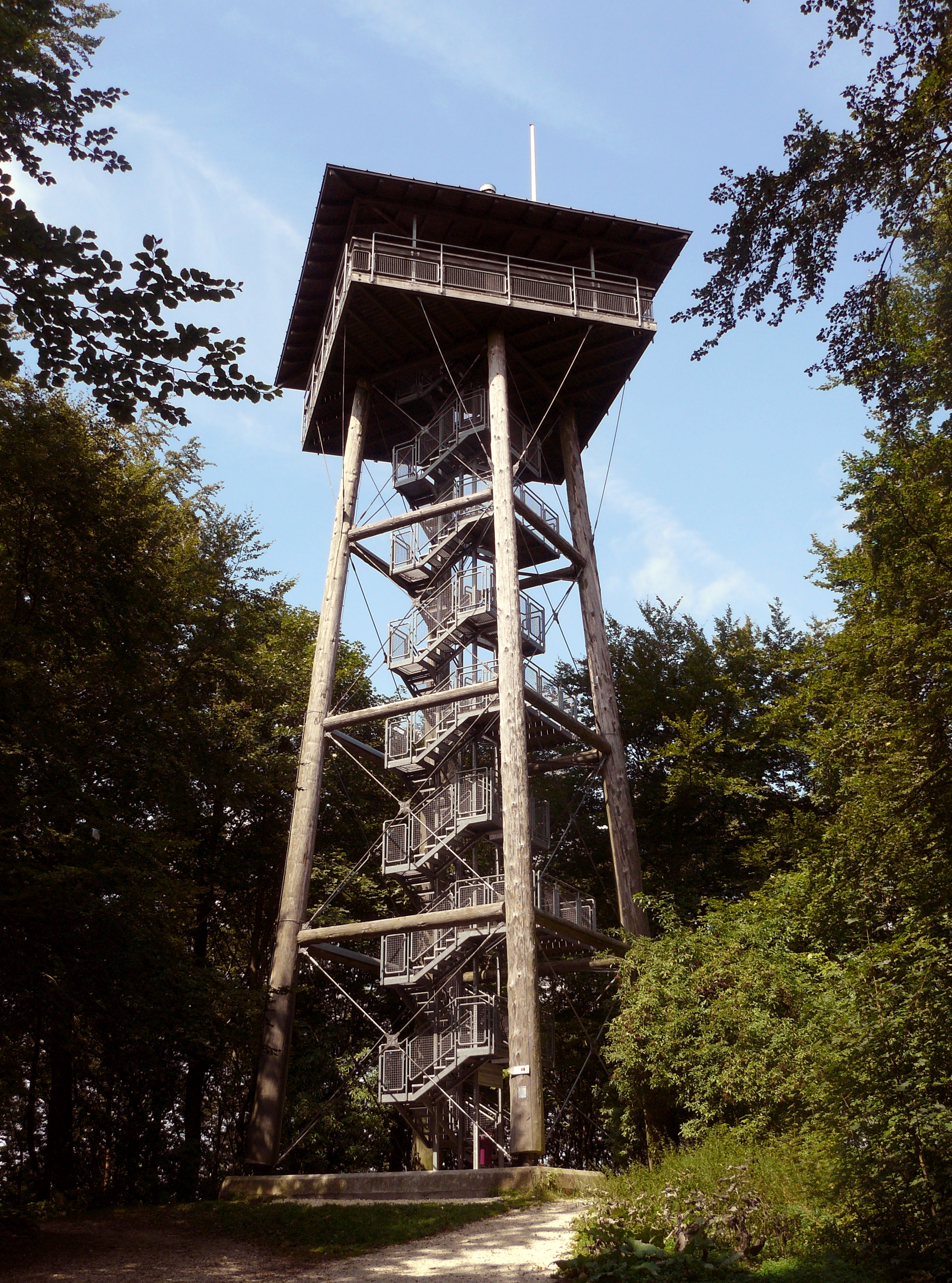
Aalbäumle observation tower

The 26 metres (85 ft) tall Aalbäumle observation tower is built atop Langert mountain. This popular hiking destination was built in 1898 and was remodelled in 1992. It features a good view over Aalen and the Welland region, up to the Rosenstein mountain and Ellwangen. Beneath the tower, an adventure playground and a cabin is located. A flag on the tower signals whether the cabin's restaurant is open.

=== Natural monuments ===
The Baden-Württemberg State Institute for Environment, Measurements and Natural Conservation has laid out six protected landscapes in Aalen (the Swabian Jura escarpment between Lautern and Aalen with adjacent territories, the Swabian Jura escarpment between Unterkochen and Baiershofen, the Hilllands around Hofen, the Kugeltal and Ebnater Tal valleys with parts of Heiligental valley and adjacent territories, Laubachtal valley and Lower Lein Valley with side valleys), two sanctuary forests (Glashütte and Kocher Origin), 65 extensive natural monuments, 30 individual natural monuments and the following two protected areas:

The 24.1 hectares (60 acres) large Dellenhäule protected area between Aalen's Waldhausen district and Neresheim's Elchingen district, created in 1969, is a sheep pasture with juniper and wood pasture of old willow oaks.

The 46.5 hectares (115 acres) large Goldshöfer Sande protected area was established in 2000 and is situated between Aalen's Hofen district and Hüttlingen. The sands on the hill originated from the Early Pleistocene are of geological importance, and the various grove structures offer habitat to severely endangered bird species.

=== Sports ===
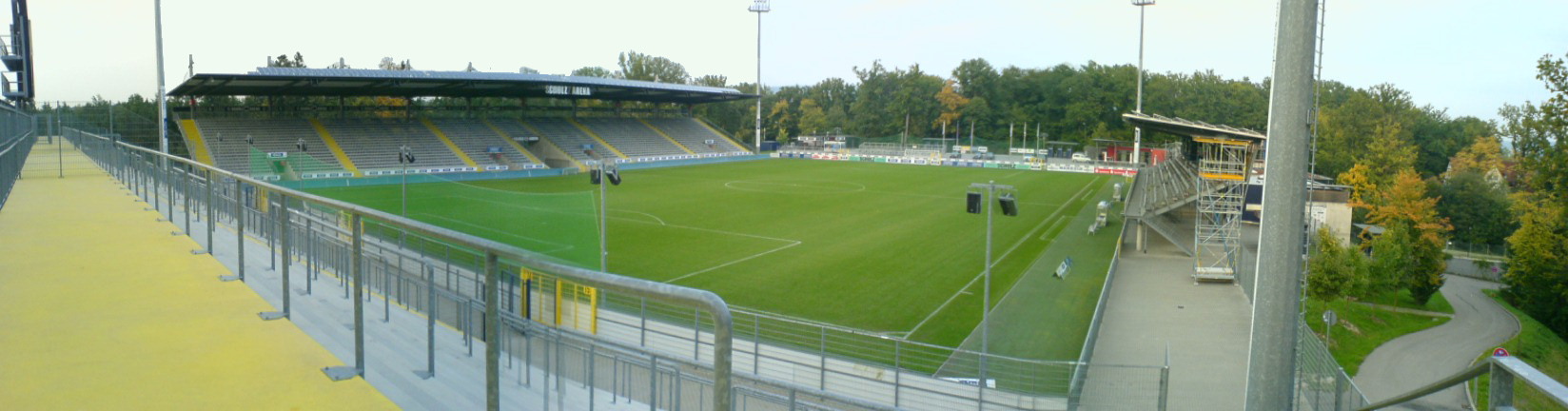
Scholz Arena

The football team, VfR Aalen, was founded in 1921 and played in the 2nd German League between 2012 and 2015, after which they were relegated to 3. Liga. Its playing venue is the Scholz-Arena situated in the west of the town, which bore the name Städtisches Waldstadion Aalen ("Civic Forest Stadium of Aalen") until 2008. From 1939 until 1945, the VfR played in the Gauliga Württemberg, then one of several parallel top-ranking soccer leagues of Germany.

The KSV Aalen wrestles in the Wrestling Federal League. It was German champion in team wrestling in 2010. Its predecessor, the KSV Germania Aalen disbanded in 2005, was German champion eight times and runner-up five times since 1976. Another Aalen club, the TSV Dewangen, wrestled in the Federal League until 2009.

Two American sports, American football and Baseball, are pursued by the MTV Aalen. Volleyball has been gaining in popularity in Aalen for years. The first men's team of DJK Aalen accomplished qualification for regional league in the season of 2008/09.

The Ostalb ski lifts are located south of the town centre, at the northern slope of the Swabian Jura. The skiing area comprises two platter lifts that have a vertical rise of 130 and 30 metres (427 and 98 ft), with two runs with lengths of 800 and 1,200 metres (2,600 and 3,900 ft) and a beginners' run.

=== Regular events ===
==== Reichsstädter Tage ====
Since 1975, Reichsstädter Tage ("Imperial City days") festival is held annually in the town centre on the second weekend in September. It is deemed the largest festival of the Ostwürttemberg region, and is associated with a shopping Sunday in accordance with the Ladenschlussgesetz code. The festival is also attended by delegations from the twinned cities. On the town hall square, on Sunday an ecumenical service is held.

==== Roman Festival ====
The international Roman Festival (Römertage) are held biannially on the site of the former Roman fort and the modern Limes museum. The festival's ninth event in 2008 was attended by around 11,000 people.

==== Aalen Jazz Festival ====
Annually during the second week of November, the Aalen Jazz Festival brings known and unknown artists to Aalen. It has already featured musicians like Miles Davis, B. B. King, Ray Charles, David Murray, McCoy Tyner, Al Jarreau, Esbjörn Svensson and Albert Mangelsdorff. The festival is complemented by individual concerts in spring and summer, and, including the individual concerts, comprises around 25 concerts with a total of about 13,000 visitors.

== Economy and infrastructure ==
In 2008 there were 30,008 employees liable to social insurance living in Aalen. 13,946 (46.5 percent) were employed in the manufacturing sector, 4,715 (15.7 percent) in commerce, catering, hotels and transport, and 11,306 (37.7 percent) in other services. Annually 16,000 employees commute to work, with about 9,000 living in the town and commuting out.

Altogether in Aalen there are about 4,700 business enterprises, 1,100 of them being registered in the trade register. The others comprise 2,865 small enterprises and 701 craft enterprises.

In Aalen, metalworking is the predominant industry, along with machine-building. Other industries include optics, paper, information technology, chemicals, textiles, medical instruments, pharmaceuticals, and food.

Notable enterprises include SHW Automotive (originating from the former Schwäbische Hüttenwerke steel mills and a mill of 1671 in Wasseralfingen), the Alfing Kessler engineering works, the precision tools manufacturer MAPAL Dr. Kress, the snow chain manufacturer RUD Ketten Rieger & Dietz and its subsidiary Erlau, the Gesenkschmiede Schneider forging die smithery, the SDZ Druck und Medien media company, the Papierfabrik Palm paper mill, the alarm system manufacturer Telenot, the laser show provider LOBO electronic and the textile finisher Lindenfarb, which all have their seat in Aalen. A branch in Aalen is maintained by optical systems manufacturer Carl Zeiss headquartered in nearby Oberkochen.

=== Transport ===
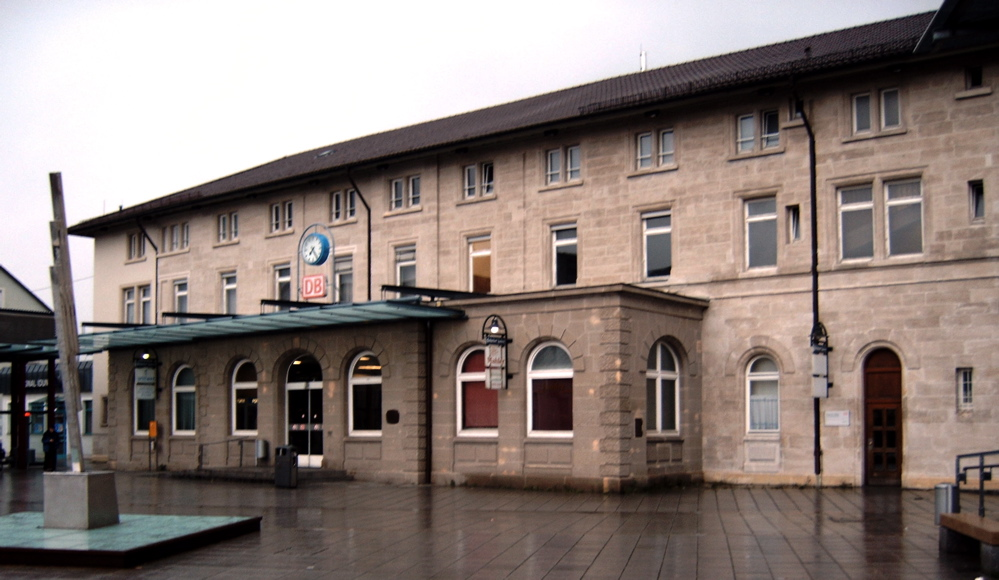
Aalen station

==== Rail ====
Aalen station is a regional railway hub on the Stuttgart-Bad Cannstatt–Nördlingen railway from Stuttgart and Nördlingen, the Aalen–Ulm railway from Ulm and the Goldshöfe–Crailsheim railway to Crailsheim. Until 1972, the Härtsfeld Railway connected Aalen with Dillingen an der Donau via Neresheim. Other railway stations within the town limits are Hofen (b Aalen), Unterkochen, Wasseralfingen and Goldshöfe station. The Aalen-Erlau stop situated in the south is no longer operational.

Aalen station is served at two-hour intervals by trains of Intercity line 61 Karlsruhe–Stuttgart–Aalen–Nuremberg. For regional rail travel, Aalen is served by various lines of the Interregio-Express, Regional-Express and Regionalbahn categories. Since the beginning of 2019, the British company Go-Ahead took over the regional railway business of DB Regio in the region surrounding Aalen. The town also operates the Aalen industrial railway (Industriebahn Aalen), which carries about 250 carloads per year.

==== Bus ====
Aalen also is a regional hub in the bus network of OstalbMobil, the transport network of the district Aalen is in. The bus lines are operated and serviced by regional companies like OVA and RBS RegioBus Stuttgart.

==== Street ====
The junctions of Aalen/Westhausen and Aalen/Oberkochen connect Aalen with the Autobahn A7 (Würzburg–Füssen). Federal roads (Bundesstraßen) connecting with Aalen are B 19 (Würzburg–Ulm), B 29 (Waiblingen–Nördlingen) and B 290 (Tauberbischofsheim–Westhausen). The Schwäbische Dichterstraße ("Swabian Poets' Route") tourist route established in 1977/78 leads through Aalen.

Several bus lines operate within the borough. The Omnibus-Verkehr Aalen company is one of the few in Germany that use double-decker buses, it has done so since 1966. A district-wide fare system, OstalbMobil, has been in effect since 2007.

==== Air transport ====
Stuttgart Airport, offering international connections, is about 90 kilometres (56 mi) away, the travel time by train is about 100 Minutes. At Aalen-Heidenheim Airport, located 15 kilometres (9.3 mi) south-east of Aalen, small aircraft are permitted. Gliding airfields nearby are in Heubach and Bartholomä.

==== Bicycle ====
Bicycle routes stretching through Aalen are the Deutscher Limes-Radweg ("German Limes Bicycle Route") and the Kocher-Jagst Bicycle Route.

=== Public facilities ===
Aalen houses an Amtsgericht (local district court), chambers of the Stuttgart Labour Court, a notary's office, a tax office and an employment agency. It is the seat of the Ostalbkreis district office, of the Aalen Deanery of the Evangelical-Lutheran Church and of the Ostalb deanery of the Roman Catholic Diocese of Rottenburg-Stuttgart.

The Stuttgart administrative court, the Stuttgart Labour Court and the Ulm Social Welfare Court are in charge for Aalen.

Aalen had a civic hospital, which resided in the Bürgerspital building until 1873, then in a building at Alte Heidenheimer Straße. In 1942, the hospital was taken over by the district. The district hospital at the present site of Kälblesrain, known today as Ostalb-Klinikum, was opened in 1955.

=== Media ===
The first local newspaper, Der Bote von Aalen ("The Herald of Aalen"), has been published on Wednesdays and Saturdays since 1837.

Currently, local newspapers published in Aalen are the Schwäbische Post, which obtains its supra-regional pages from the Ulm-based Südwestpresse, and the Aalener Nachrichten (erstwhile Aalener Volkszeitung), a local edition of Schwäbische Zeitung in Leutkirch im Allgäu.

Two of Germany's biggest Lesezirkels (magazine rental services) are headquartered in Aalen: Brabandt LZ Plus Media and Lesezirkel Portal.

Regional event magazines are Xaver, åla, ålakultur.

The commercial broadcasters Radio Ton and Radio 7 have studios in Aalen.

=== Education ===
A Latin school was first recorded in Aalen in 1447; it was remodeled in 1616 and also later in various buildings that were all situated near the town church, and continued up through the 19th century. In the course of the reformation, a "German school" was established in tandem, being a predecessor of the latter Volksschule school type. In 1860, the Ritterschule was built as a Volksschule for girls; the building today houses the Pestalozzischule. In 1866, a new building was erected for the Latin school and for the Realschule established in 1840. This building, later known as the Alte Gewerbeschule, was torn down in 1975 to free up land for the new town hall. In 1912, the Parkschule building was opened. It was designed by Paul Bonatz and today houses the Schubart-Gymnasium.

The biggest educational institution in the town is the Hochschule Aalen, which was founded in 1962 and focuses on engineering and economics. It is attended by 5000 students on five campuses and employs 129 professors and 130 other lecturers.

The town provides three Gymnasiums, four Realschulen, two Förderschulen (special schools), six combined Grundschulen and Hauptschulen and eight standalone Grundschulen. The Ostalbkreis district provides three vocational schools and three additional special schools. Finally, six non-state schools of various types exist.

The German Esperanto Library (German: Deutsche Esperanto-Bibliothek, Esperanto: Germana Esperanto-Biblioteko) has been located in the building of the town library since 1989.

=== TV and radio transmission tower ===
The Südwestrundfunk broadcasting company operates the Aalen transmission tower on the Braunenberg hill. The tower was erected in 1956, it is 140 metres (460 ft) tall and made of reinforced concrete.

=== Things named after Aalen ===
The following vehicles are named "Aalen":

- The Lufthansa Boeing 737-500 D-ABJF
- The Deutsche Bahn ICE 3 Tz309 (since 2 June 2008)
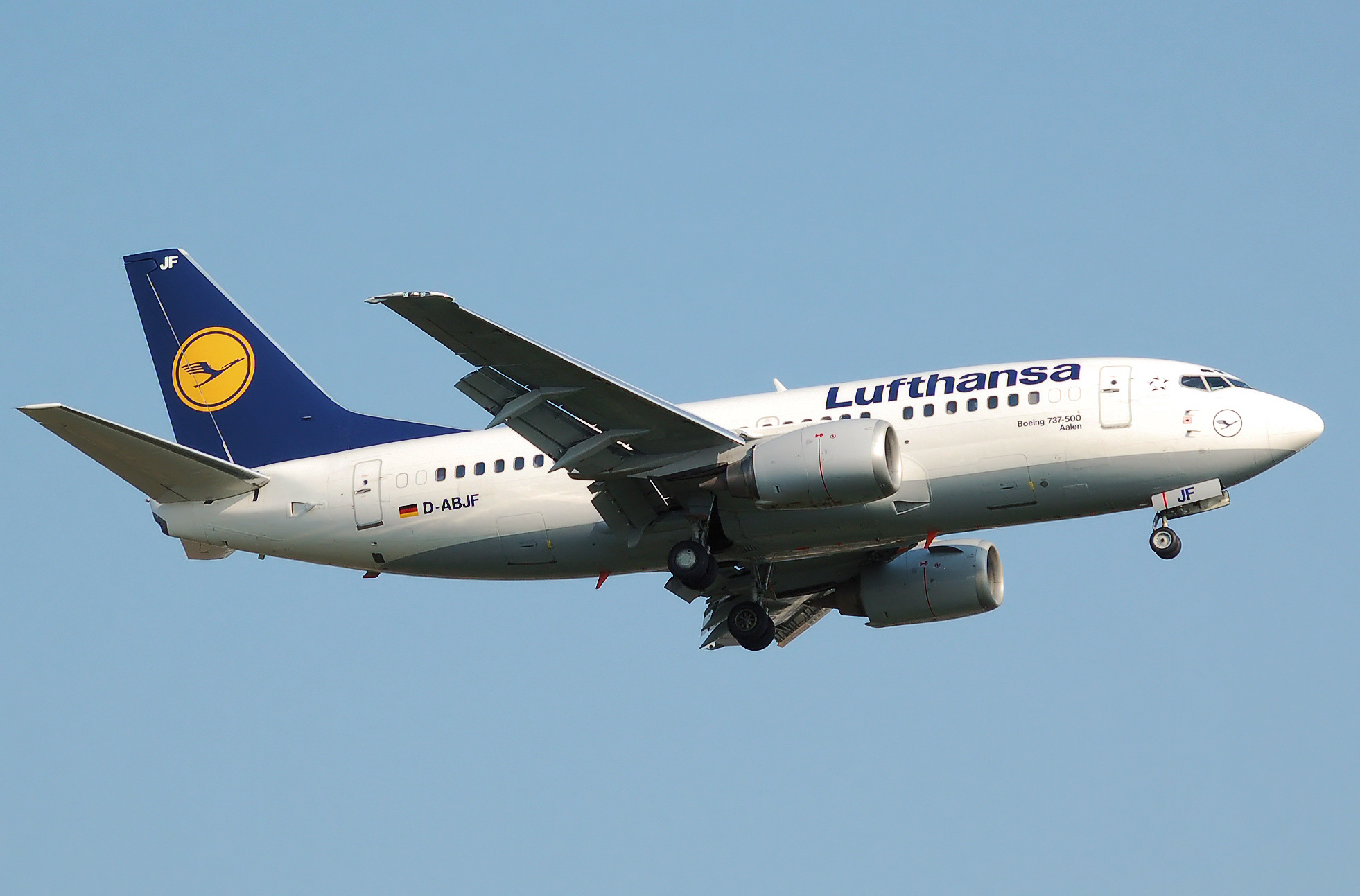
Boeing 737-500 "Aalen"

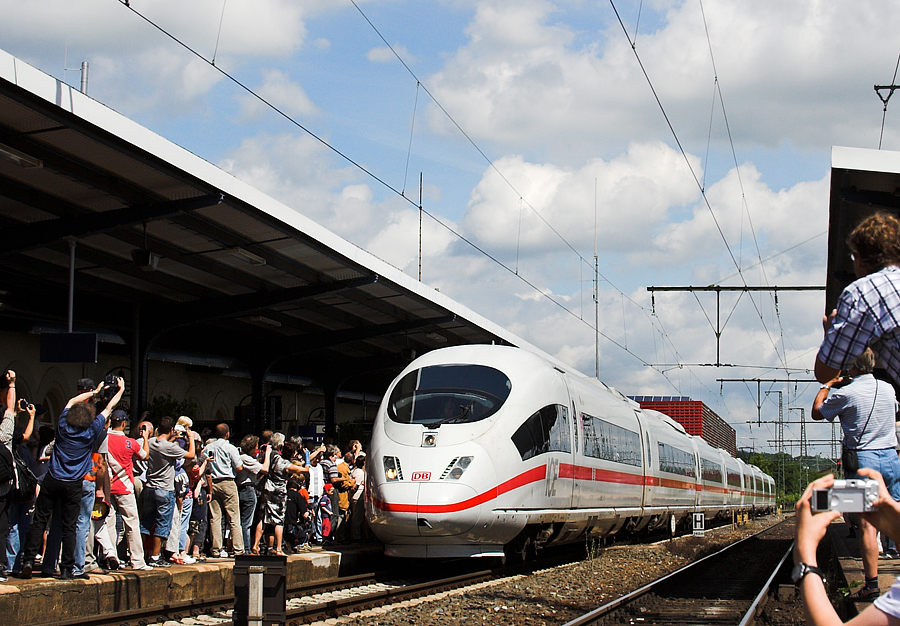
ICE "Aalen" at Aalen station

== Notable people ==
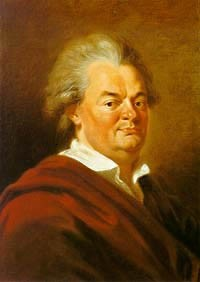
Christian Friedrich Daniel Schubart, before 1804

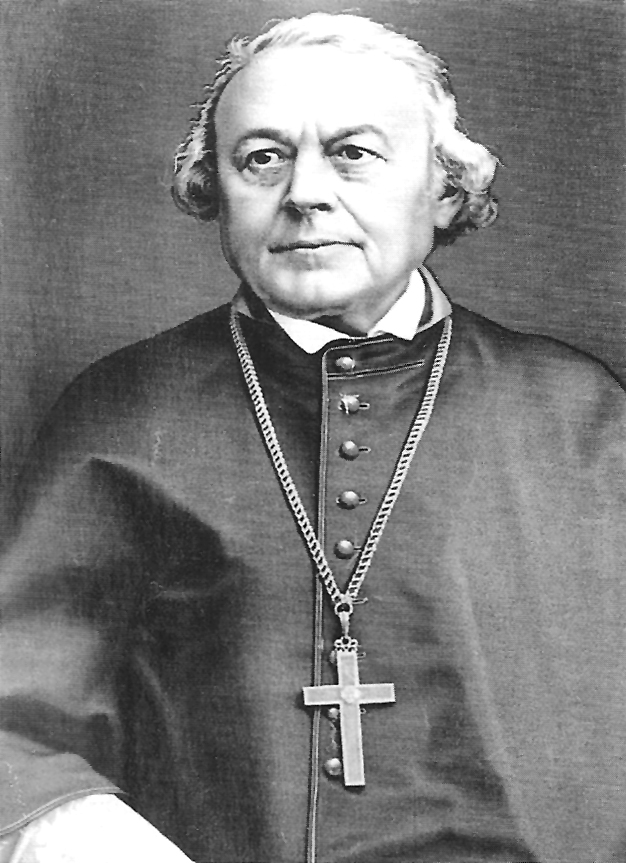
Karl Joseph von Hefele, 1869

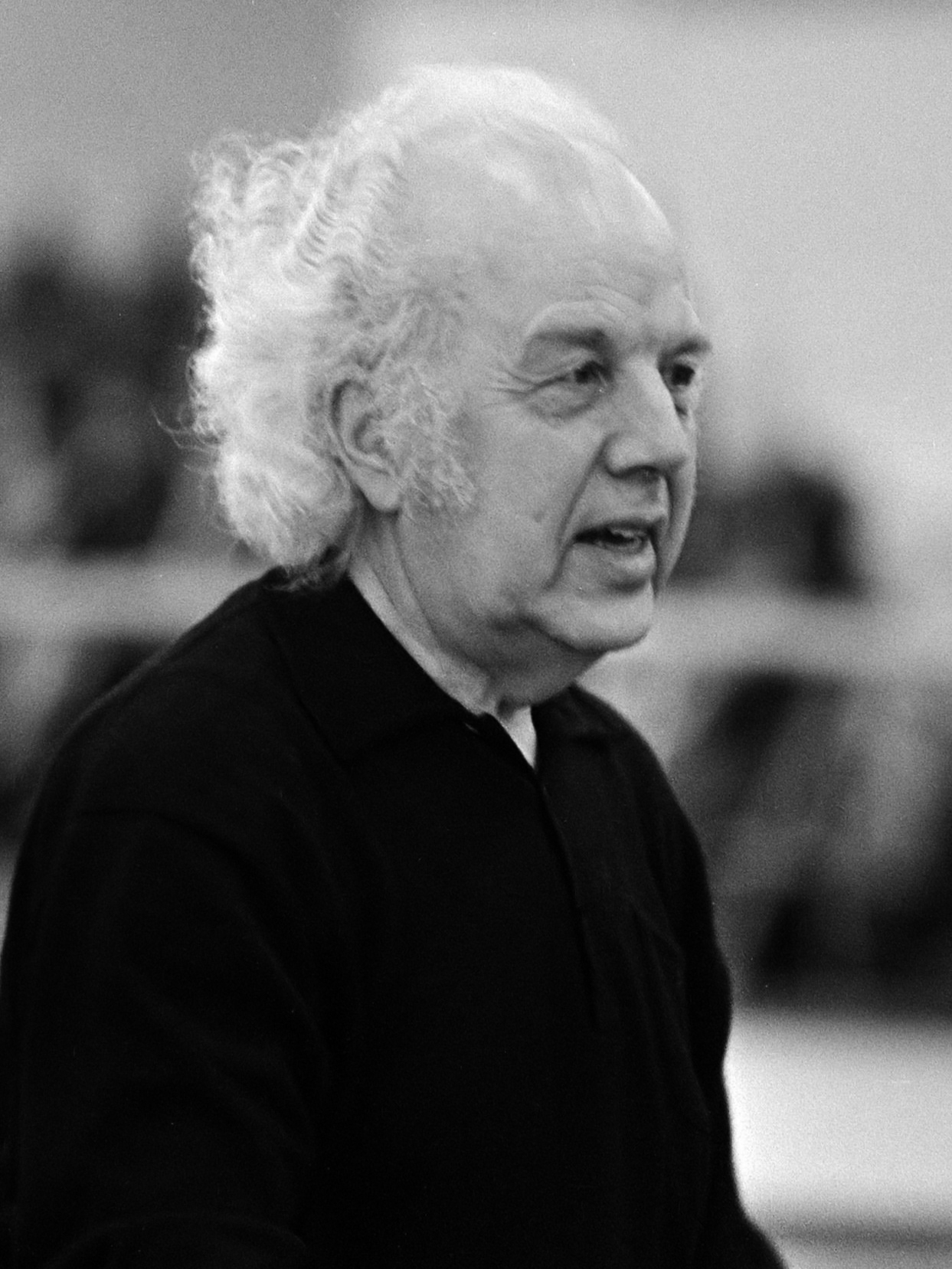
Kurt Jooss, 1971

- Johann Christoph von Westerstetten (1563–1637), Prince-bishop of Eichstätt and counter-reformer
- Christian Friedrich Daniel Schubart (1739–1791), poet, organ player, composer and journalist; lived in Aalen as a child and adolescent.
- Karl Joseph von Hefele (1809–1893), Roman Catholic theologian, clerical historian and bishop.
- Stephan Jakob Neher (1829–1902), Catholic priest and church historian.
- Rudolf Duala Manga Bell (1873–1914), King of Duala and resistance leader in the German colony of Kamerun, lived in Aalen from 1891 until 1896.
- Karl Wahl (1892–1981), Gauleiter of Gau Swabia, Obergruppenführer
- Kurt Jooss (1901–1979), born in Wasseralfingen; dancer, choreographer and dance educator
- Georg Elser (1903–1945), opponent of Nazism, worked in 1923 as an apprentice carpenter in Aalen.
- August Zehender (1903–1945), SS Brigade Commander and Major General of the Waffen-SS
- Bruno Heck (1917–1989), politician (CDU), former minister of the government and CDU secretary general
- Hermann Bausinger (1926–2021), cultural scientist
- Hans Elsässer (1929–2003), astronomer and founding director of the Max Planck Institute for Astronomy
- Werner Sobek (born 1953), architect and structural engineer
- Gerhard Thiele (born 1953 in Heidenheim), physicist and former astronaut, attended school in Aalen.
- Angela Schanelec (born 1962), actress, film director and screenwriter
- Ulrich Spiesshofer (born 1964), business executive, former CEO of the ABB Group
- Martin Gerlach, (DE Wiki) (born 1965), independent politician, mayor of Aalen (2005–2013)
- Steffen Schorn (born 1967), jazz musician & professor at the Hochschule für Musik Nürnberg
- Carlo Waibel (born 1990), singer known as Cro, wears a panda mask on stage.

=== Sport ===
- Werner Bickelhaupt (born 1939), football coach, lives in Aalen since 2004, head coach for Swaziland for 3 months in 2003
- Walter Adams (born 1945 in Wasseralfingen), middle-distance runner
- Thomas Zander (born 1967), wrestler, world champion in 1994 and silver medallist at the 1996 Summer Olympics
- Carl-Uwe Steeb (born 1967), retired tennis player
- Erol Sabanov (born 1974), former football goalkeeper who played about 300 games
- Andreas Beck (born 1987), footballer, immigrated aged 3, grew up in Aalen; played about 475 games and 9 for Germany
- Patrick Funk (born 1990), footballer, played about 375 games
- Fabio Kaufmann (born 1992), footballer, played over 350 games

=== Honorary citizens ===
- Erwin Rommel (1891–1944), Field Marshal of World War II, grew up in Aalen
- Wilhelm Jakob Schweiker (1859–1927), founder of the Aalen Historical Society (Geschichts- und Altertumsverein Aalen) and name giver of the Wilhelm Jakob Schweiker Award
- Ulrich Pfeifle, Mayor of Aalen from 1976 until 2005
