= Aalen – Heidenheim =

Federal electoral district of Germany

270 Aalen – Heidenheim
- Electoral district for the Bundestag
- Aalen – Heidenheim in 2025
- State: Baden-Württemberg
- Population: 305,500 (2019)
- Electorate: 220,686 (2021)
- Major settlements: Aalen; Heidenheim an der Brenz; Ellwangen
- Area: 1,644.6 km^{2}

Current electoral district
- Created: 1965
- Party: CDU
- Member: Roderich Kiesewetter
- Elected: 2009, 2013, 2017, 2021, 2025

Aalen – Heidenheim is an electoral constituency (German: Wahlkreis) represented in the Bundestag. It elects one member via first-past-the-post voting. Under the current constituency numbering system, it is designated as constituency 270. It is located in eastern Baden-Württemberg, comprising the Heidenheim district and the eastern part of the Ostalbkreis district.

Aalen – Heidenheim was created for the 1965 federal election. Since 2009, it has been represented by Roderich Kiesewetter of the Christian Democratic Union (CDU).

== Geography ==
Aalen – Heidenheim is located in eastern Baden-Württemberg. As of the 2021 federal election, it comprises the Heidenheim district and the municipalities of Aalen, Adelmannsfelden, Bopfingen, Ellenberg, Ellwangen, Essingen, Hüttlingen, Jagstzell, Kirchheim am Ries, Lauchheim, Neresheim, Neuler, Oberkochen, Rainau, Riesbürg, Rosenberg, Stödtlen, Tannhausen, Unterschneidheim, Westhausen, and Wört from the Ostalbkreis district.

== History ==
Aalen – Heidenheim was created in 1965. In the 1965 through 1998 elections, it was constituency 174 in the numbering system. In the 2002 and 2005 elections, it was number 271. Since the 2009 election, it has been number 270.

Originally, the constituency comprised the districts of Aalen and Heidenheim. It acquired its current borders in the 1980 election.

Election	No.	Name	Borders
1965	174	Aalen – Heidenheim	Aalen district; Heidenheim district
1969	174	Aalen – Heidenheim	Aalen district; Heidenheim district
1972	174	Aalen – Heidenheim	Aalen district; Heidenheim district
1976	174	Aalen – Heidenheim	Aalen district; Heidenheim district
1980	174	Aalen – Heidenheim	Heidenheim district; Ostalbkreis district (only Aalen, Adelmannsfelden, Bopfingen, Ellenberg, Ellwangen, Essingen, Hüttlingen, Jagstzell, Kirchheim am Ries, Lauchheim, Neresheim, Neuler, Oberkochen, Rainau, Riesbürg, Rosenberg, Stödtlen, Tannhausen, Unterschneidheim, Westhausen, and Wört municipalities)
1983	174	Aalen – Heidenheim	Heidenheim district; Ostalbkreis district (only Aalen, Adelmannsfelden, Bopfingen, Ellenberg, Ellwangen, Essingen, Hüttlingen, Jagstzell, Kirchheim am Ries, Lauchheim, Neresheim, Neuler, Oberkochen, Rainau, Riesbürg, Rosenberg, Stödtlen, Tannhausen, Unterschneidheim, Westhausen, and Wört municipalities)
1987	174	Aalen – Heidenheim	Heidenheim district; Ostalbkreis district (only Aalen, Adelmannsfelden, Bopfingen, Ellenberg, Ellwangen, Essingen, Hüttlingen, Jagstzell, Kirchheim am Ries, Lauchheim, Neresheim, Neuler, Oberkochen, Rainau, Riesbürg, Rosenberg, Stödtlen, Tannhausen, Unterschneidheim, Westhausen, and Wört municipalities)
1990	174	Aalen – Heidenheim	Heidenheim district; Ostalbkreis district (only Aalen, Adelmannsfelden, Bopfingen, Ellenberg, Ellwangen, Essingen, Hüttlingen, Jagstzell, Kirchheim am Ries, Lauchheim, Neresheim, Neuler, Oberkochen, Rainau, Riesbürg, Rosenberg, Stödtlen, Tannhausen, Unterschneidheim, Westhausen, and Wört municipalities)
1994	174	Aalen – Heidenheim	Heidenheim district; Ostalbkreis district (only Aalen, Adelmannsfelden, Bopfingen, Ellenberg, Ellwangen, Essingen, Hüttlingen, Jagstzell, Kirchheim am Ries, Lauchheim, Neresheim, Neuler, Oberkochen, Rainau, Riesbürg, Rosenberg, Stödtlen, Tannhausen, Unterschneidheim, Westhausen, and Wört municipalities)
1998	174	Aalen – Heidenheim	Heidenheim district; Ostalbkreis district (only Aalen, Adelmannsfelden, Bopfingen, Ellenberg, Ellwangen, Essingen, Hüttlingen, Jagstzell, Kirchheim am Ries, Lauchheim, Neresheim, Neuler, Oberkochen, Rainau, Riesbürg, Rosenberg, Stödtlen, Tannhausen, Unterschneidheim, Westhausen, and Wört municipalities)
2002	271	Aalen – Heidenheim	Heidenheim district; Ostalbkreis district (only Aalen, Adelmannsfelden, Bopfingen, Ellenberg, Ellwangen, Essingen, Hüttlingen, Jagstzell, Kirchheim am Ries, Lauchheim, Neresheim, Neuler, Oberkochen, Rainau, Riesbürg, Rosenberg, Stödtlen, Tannhausen, Unterschneidheim, Westhausen, and Wört municipalities)
2005	271	Aalen – Heidenheim	Heidenheim district; Ostalbkreis district (only Aalen, Adelmannsfelden, Bopfingen, Ellenberg, Ellwangen, Essingen, Hüttlingen, Jagstzell, Kirchheim am Ries, Lauchheim, Neresheim, Neuler, Oberkochen, Rainau, Riesbürg, Rosenberg, Stödtlen, Tannhausen, Unterschneidheim, Westhausen, and Wört municipalities)
2009	270	Aalen – Heidenheim	Heidenheim district; Ostalbkreis district (only Aalen, Adelmannsfelden, Bopfingen, Ellenberg, Ellwangen, Essingen, Hüttlingen, Jagstzell, Kirchheim am Ries, Lauchheim, Neresheim, Neuler, Oberkochen, Rainau, Riesbürg, Rosenberg, Stödtlen, Tannhausen, Unterschneidheim, Westhausen, and Wört municipalities)
2013	270	Aalen – Heidenheim	Heidenheim district; Ostalbkreis district (only Aalen, Adelmannsfelden, Bopfingen, Ellenberg, Ellwangen, Essingen, Hüttlingen, Jagstzell, Kirchheim am Ries, Lauchheim, Neresheim, Neuler, Oberkochen, Rainau, Riesbürg, Rosenberg, Stödtlen, Tannhausen, Unterschneidheim, Westhausen, and Wört municipalities)
2017	270	Aalen – Heidenheim	Heidenheim district; Ostalbkreis district (only Aalen, Adelmannsfelden, Bopfingen, Ellenberg, Ellwangen, Essingen, Hüttlingen, Jagstzell, Kirchheim am Ries, Lauchheim, Neresheim, Neuler, Oberkochen, Rainau, Riesbürg, Rosenberg, Stödtlen, Tannhausen, Unterschneidheim, Westhausen, and Wört municipalities)
2021	270	Aalen – Heidenheim	Heidenheim district; Ostalbkreis district (only Aalen, Adelmannsfelden, Bopfingen, Ellenberg, Ellwangen, Essingen, Hüttlingen, Jagstzell, Kirchheim am Ries, Lauchheim, Neresheim, Neuler, Oberkochen, Rainau, Riesbürg, Rosenberg, Stödtlen, Tannhausen, Unterschneidheim, Westhausen, and Wört municipalities)
2025	270	Aalen – Heidenheim	Heidenheim district; Ostalbkreis district (only Aalen, Adelmannsfelden, Bopfingen, Ellenberg, Ellwangen, Essingen, Hüttlingen, Jagstzell, Kirchheim am Ries, Lauchheim, Neresheim, Neuler, Oberkochen, Rainau, Riesbürg, Rosenberg, Stödtlen, Tannhausen, Unterschneidheim, Westhausen, and Wört municipalities)

== Members ==
The constituency has been held continuously by the Christian Democratic Union (CDU) since its creation. It was first represented by Manfred Abelein from 1965 to 1990, a total of seven consecutive terms. Georg Brunnhuber was representative from 1990 to 2009. Roderich Kiesewetter was elected in 2009, and re-elected in 2013, 2017, 2021 and 2025.

Election	Member	Party	%
1965	Manfred Abelein	CDU	57.7
1969	Manfred Abelein	CDU	56.7
1972	Manfred Abelein	CDU	53.1
1976	Manfred Abelein	CDU	57.1
1980	Manfred Abelein	CDU	53.5
1983	Manfred Abelein	CDU	58.5
1987	Manfred Abelein	CDU	52.9
1990	Georg Brunnhuber	CDU	49.5
1994	Georg Brunnhuber	CDU	49.5
1998	Georg Brunnhuber	CDU	44.2
2002	Georg Brunnhuber	CDU	49.3
2005	Georg Brunnhuber	CDU	49.9
2009	Roderich Kiesewetter	CDU	45.0
2013	Roderich Kiesewetter	CDU	57.6
2017	Roderich Kiesewetter	CDU	46.4
2021	Roderich Kiesewetter	CDU	37.0
2025	Roderich Kiesewetter	CDU	41.4

== Election results ==
=== 2025 election ===
Federal election (2025): Aalen – Heidenheim
Notes:	Blue background denotes the winner of the electorate vote. Pink background denotes a candidate elected from their party list. Yellow background denotes an electorate win by a list member, or other incumbent. A ✓ or ✗ denotes status of any incumbent, win or lose respectively.						
Party	Candidate	Votes	%	±%	Party votes	%	±%
CDU	✓ Roderich Kiesewetter	74,007	41.4	▲4.3	62,269	34.7	▲7.3
AfD	Jürgen Müller	41,336	23.1	▲12.9	41,365	23.0	▲12.3
SPD	Cornelia True	25,137	14.1	▼7.8	25,288	14.1	▼9.5
Greens	Jeannette Behringer	14,872	8.3	▼3.9	16,827	9.4	▼3.3
FDP	Chris-Robert Berendt	6,425	3.6	▼5.8	8,745	4.9	▼9.8
FW	Gabriele Regele	4,984	2.8	▲0.1	2,930	1.6	▼0.5
dieBasis				▼2.5	581	0.3	▼1.7
Left	Thomas Jensen	8,987	5.0	▲2.7	9,696	5.4	▲2.7
Tierschutzpartei					1,362	0.8	▼0.3
PARTEI				▼1.4	701	0.4	▼0.5
Team Todenhöfer							▼0.4
Pirates							{▼0.3
ÖDP					334	0.2	▼0.1
Volt	Nina Klomsdorf	1,878	1.1	▲0.7	918	0.5	▲0.3
Bündnis C					219	0.1	Steady
BD	Petra Hackl	1,198	0.7		339	0.2	
Gesundheitsforschung							▼0.1
Bürgerbewegung							▼0.4
Humanists							▼0.1
BSW					7,911	4.4	
MLPD				▼0.1	68	0.0	0.0
Informal votes		1,738			1,009		
Total valid votes		178,824			179,553		
Turnout		180,562	82.9	▲6.5			
CDU hold	Majority			▲4.3			

=== 2021 election ===
Federal election (2021): Aalen – Heidenheim
Notes:	Blue background denotes the winner of the electorate vote. Pink background denotes a candidate elected from their party list. Yellow background denotes an electorate win by a list member, or other incumbent. A ✓ or ✗ denotes status of any incumbent, win or lose respectively.						
Party	Candidate	Votes	%	±%	Party votes	%	±%
CDU	✓ Roderich Kiesewetter	61,832	37.0	▼9.4	45,852	27.4	▼10.8
SPD	Leni Breymaier	36,501	21.9	▲0.9	39,468	23.6	▲5.0
Greens	Margit Stumpp	20,364	12.2	▲2.6	21,226	12.7	▲1.7
AfD	Jan-Hendrik Czada	16,988	10.2	▼0.8	17,937	10.7	▼1.5
FDP	Arian Kriesch	15,708	9.4	▲3.3	24,562	14.7	▲4.2
FW	Peter Koptisch	4,477	2.7		3,610	2.2	▲1.5
dieBasis	Steffen Weller	4,114	2.5		3,375	2.0	
Left	Tim Steckbauer	3,905	2.3	▼2.8	4,538	2.7	▼2.8
Tierschutzpartei					1,770	1.1	▲0.3
PARTEI	Alexander Ortmann	2,313	1.4		1,469	0.9	▲0.3
Team Todenhöfer					644	0.4	
Pirates					556	0.3	0.0
ÖDP					439	0.3	▼0.1
Volt	Pia Großer	542	0.3		417	0.2	
Bündnis C					274	0.2	
NPD					226	0.1	▼0.3
Gesundheitsforschung					210	0.1	
Bürgerbewegung					170	0.1	
Humanists					141	0.1	
DiB					138	0.1	0.0
MLPD	Roland Maier	189	0.1	▼0.1	87	0.1	0.0
DKP					56	0.0	0.0
Bündnis 21					43	0.0	
LKR					37	0.0	
Informal votes		1,722			1,410		
Total valid votes		166,933			167,245		
Turnout		168,655	76.4	▼0.3			
CDU hold	Majority	25,331	15.1	▼10.2			

=== 2017 election ===
Federal election (2017): Aalen – Heidenheim
Notes:	Blue background denotes the winner of the electorate vote. Pink background denotes a candidate elected from their party list. Yellow background denotes an electorate win by a list member, or other incumbent. A ✓ or ✗ denotes status of any incumbent, win or lose respectively.						
Party	Candidate	Votes	%	±%	Party votes	%	±%
CDU	✓ Roderich Kiesewetter	77,752	46.4	▼11.2	64,217	38.2	▼11.2
SPD	Leni Breymaier	35,164	21.0	▼3.7	31,341	18.6	▼3.7
AfD	Ruben Rupp	18,447	11.0		20,616	12.3	▲7.7
Greens	Margit Stumpp	16,123	9.6	▲1.9	18,427	11.0	▲2.5
FDP	Silke Leber	10,218	6.1	▲4.3	17,707	10.5	▲6.0
Left	Saskia Jürgens	8,678	5.2	▲0.2	9,233	5.5	▲0.8
Tierschutzpartei					1,217	0.7	▲0.1
FW					1,061	0.6	▲0.2
PARTEI					1,000	0.6	
NPD	Dominik Stürmer	822	0.5		655	0.4	▼1.0
Pirates					609	0.4	▼1.6
ÖDP					550	0.3	▼0.1
Tierschutzallianz					321	0.2	
BGE					221	0.1	
Menschliche Welt					206	0.1	
DM					204	0.1	
DiB					188	0.1	
V-Partei³					173	0.1	
MLPD	Roland Maier	382	0.2		125	0.1	0.0
DKP					79	0.0	
DIE RECHTE					66	0.0	
Informal votes		2,605			1,975		
Total valid votes		167,586			168,216		
Turnout		170,191	76.7	▲3.6			
CDU hold	Majority	42,588	25.4	▼7.6			

=== 2013 election ===
Federal election (2013): Aalen – Heidenheim
Notes:	Blue background denotes the winner of the electorate vote. Pink background denotes a candidate elected from their party list. Yellow background denotes an electorate win by a list member, or other incumbent. A ✓ or ✗ denotes status of any incumbent, win or lose respectively.						
Party	Candidate	Votes	%	±%	Party votes	%	±%
CDU	✓ Roderich Kiesewetter	92,293	57.6	▲12.6	79,409	49.3	▲12.5
SPD	Claudia Sünder	39,464	24.6	▼0.8	35,861	22.3	▲1.8
Greens	Margit Stumpp	12,402	7.7	▼1.3	13,532	8.4	▼2.9
Left	Dieter Köhler	7,929	5.0	▼2.6	7,483	4.6	▼3.2
Pirates	Stefan Müller	4,934	3.1		3,118	1.9	▲0.1
FDP	Wilfried Huber	2,857	1.8	▼8.2	7,267	4.5	▼12.4
AfD					7,255	4.5	
NPD					2,166	1.3	▲0.2
Tierschutzpartei					1,010	0.6	0.0
REP					983	0.6	▼0.8
FW					692	0.4	
ÖDP					655	0.4	▼0.1
RENTNER					450	0.3	
PBC					324	0.2	▼0.2
Volksabstimmung					282	0.2	▼0.1
DKP	Johann Holzheu	231	0.1				
PRO					161	0.1	
Party of Reason					124	0.1	
BIG					96	0.1	
MLPD					49	0.0	0.0
BüSo					16	0.0	0.0
Informal votes		2,859			2,036		
Total valid votes		160,110			160,933		
Turnout		162,969	73.1	▲1.8			
CDU hold	Majority	52,829	33.0	▲13.5			

=== 2009 election ===
Federal election (2009): Aalen – Heidenheim
Notes:	Blue background denotes the winner of the electorate vote. Pink background denotes a candidate elected from their party list. Yellow background denotes an electorate win by a list member, or other incumbent. A ✓ or ✗ denotes status of any incumbent, win or lose respectively.						
Party	Candidate	Votes	%	±%	Party votes	%	±%
CDU	Roderich Kiesewetter	70,599	45.0	▼4.9	57,878	36.8	▼5.2
SPD	Claudia Sünder	39,951	25.5	▼8.7	32,195	20.5	▼11.5
FDP	Jürgen Rieg	15,604	10.0	▲4.6	26,534	16.9	▲7.0
Greens	Brian Krause	14,226	9.1	▲3.9	17,732	11.3	▲3.7
Left	Veronika Stossun	11,775	7.5	▲2.1	12,351	7.9	▲3.9
Pirates					2,830	1.8	
REP					2,251	1.4	▼0.3
NPD	Reinhild Ufermann-Schützinger	2,996	1.9		1,867	1.2	▲0.2
Independent	Jürgen Nass	1,567	1.0				
Tierschutzpartei					915	0.6	
ÖDP					827	0.5	
PBC					644	0.4	▼0.1
Volksabstimmung					397	0.3	
DIE VIOLETTEN					314	0.2	
DVU					123	0.1	
BüSo					86	0.1	0.0
ADM					66	0.0	
MLPD					55	0.0	▼0.1
Informal votes		3,218			2,871		
Total valid votes		156,718			157,065		
Turnout		159,936	71.3	▼6.6			
CDU hold	Majority	30,648	19.5	▲3.8			

=== 2005 election ===
Federal election (2005): Aalen – Heidenheim
Notes:	Blue background denotes the winner of the electorate vote. Pink background denotes a candidate elected from their party list. Yellow background denotes an electorate win by a list member, or other incumbent. A ✓ or ✗ denotes status of any incumbent, win or lose respectively.						
Party	Candidate	Votes	%	±%	Party votes	%	±%
CDU	✓ Georg Brunnhuber	85,134	49.9	▲0.6	71,995	42.0	▼4.3
SPD	Peter Simon	58,375	34.2	▼4.3	54,873	32.0	▼3.6
Left	Roland Hamm	9,162	5.4		6,771	4.0	▲3.3
FDP	Franka Struve	9,146	5.4	▲1.0.	16,892	9.9	▲3.9
Greens	Bastiaan Haveman	8,794	5.2	▲0.2	13,017	7.6	▼0.3
REP					2,891	1.7	▲0.5
NPD					1,699	1.0	▲0.8
Familie					1,351	0.8	
PBC					937	0.5	▲0.1
GRAUEN					671	0.4	▲0.3
MLPD					149	0.1	
BüSo					109	0.1	▲0.1
Informal votes		4,322			3,578		
Total valid votes		170,611			171,355		
Turnout		174,933	77.9	▼3.4			
CDU hold	Majority	26,759	15.7				
