= Aalen (electoral district) =

State electoral district of Germany

26: Aalen
- Electoral district for the Landtag of Baden-Württemberg
- Aalen in 2026
- District: Ostalbkreis
- Electorate: 123,249 (2026)
- Major settlements: Aalen, Adelmannsfelden, Bopfingen, Ellenberg, Ellwangen, Hüttlingen, Jagstzell, Kirchheim am Ries, Lauchheim, Neresheim, Neuler, Oberkochen, Rainau, Riesbürg, Rosenberg, Stödtlen, Tannhausen, Unterschneidheim, Westhausen, and Wört

Current electoral district
- Party: CDU
- Member: Winfried Mack

Aalen is an electoral constituency (German: Wahlkreis) represented in the Landtag of Baden-Württemberg. Since 2026, it has elected one member via first-past-the-post voting. Voters cast a second vote under which additional seats are allocated proportionally state-wide. Under the constituency numbering system, it is designated as constituency 26. It is wholly within the district of Ostalbkreis.

== Geography ==
The constituency includes the municipalities of Aalen, Adelmannsfelden, Bopfingen, Ellenberg, Ellwangen, Hüttlingen, Jagstzell, Kirchheim am Ries, Lauchheim, Neresheim, Neuler, Oberkochen, Rainau, Riesbürg, Rosenberg, Stödtlen, Tannhausen, Unterschneidheim, Westhausen, and Wört, within the district of Ostalbkreis.

There were 123,249 eligible voters in 2026.

== Members ==
=== First mandate ===
Both prior to and since the electoral reforms for the 2026 election, the winner of the plurality of the vote (first-past-the-post) in every constituency won the first mandate.

Election	Member	Party	%
1976	Eugen Volz	CDU	
1980	Eugen Volz	CDU	
1984	Eugen Volz	CDU	
1988	Eugen Volz	CDU	
1992	Gustav Wabro	CDU	
1996	Gustav Wabro	CDU	
2001	Winfried Mack	CDU	
2006	Winfried Mack	CDU	49.1
2011	Winfried Mack	CDU	46.4
2016	Winfried Mack	CDU	35.4
2021	Winfried Mack	CDU	29.8
2026	Winfried Mack	CDU	42.6

=== Second mandate ===
Prior to the electoral reforms for the 2026 election, the seats in the state parliament were allocated proportionately amongst parties which received more than 5% of valid votes across the state. The seats that were won proportionally for parties that did not win as many first mandates as seats they were entitled to, were allocated to their candidates which received the highest proportion of the vote in their respective constituencies. This meant that following some elections, a constituency would have one or more members elected under a second mandate.

Prior to 2011, these second mandates were allocated to the party candidates who got the greatest number of votes, whilst from 2011-2021, these were allocated according to percentage share of the vote.

Election	Member	Party
1976	Alfred Geisel	SPD
1980	Alfred Geisel	SPD
1984	Alfred Geisel	SPD
1988	Alfred Geisel	SPD
1992	Alfred Geisel	SPD
1996	Ulrich Pfeifle	SPD
Nov 1997	Ursula Haußmann	SPD
2001	Ursula Haußmann	SPD
2006	Ursula Haußmann	SPD
2011		
2016
2021

== Election results ==
=== 2026 election ===
State election (2026): Aalen
Notes:	Blue background denotes the winner of the electorate vote. Pink background denotes a candidate elected from their party list. Yellow background denotes an electorate win by a list member, or other incumbent. A ✓ or ✗ denotes status of any incumbent, win or lose respectively.						
Party	Candidate	Votes	%	±%	Party votes	%	±%
CDU	✓ Winfried Mack	36,840	42.6	▲12.8	31,633	36.5	▲6.7
AfD	Chris Hegel	18,287	21.1	▲11.7	17,847	20.6	▲11.1
Greens	Bennet Müller	17,303	20.0	▼5.0	21,192	24.4	▼0.6
SPD	Ariane Bergerhoff	6,366	7.4	▼2.6	4,803	5.5	▼4.5
FDP	Felix Wanke	3,285	3.8	▼5.3	3,258	3.8	▼5.4
Left	Carola Glaser	3,256	3.8	▲1.1	2,624	3.0	▲0.3
FW					1,722	2.0	▼7.7
BSW	Steffi Bunke	1,140	1.3		1,306	1.5	
APT					640	0.7	
Volt					474	0.5	▲0.1
PARTEI					288	0.3	▼0.9
Pensioners					157	0.2	
dieBasis					152	0.2	▼0.8
Values					149	0.2	
Bündnis C					136	0.2	
Team Todenhöfer					93	0.1	
ÖDP					85	0.1	▼0.3
Verjüngungsforschung					56	0.1	
PdF					44	0.1	
KlimalisteBW					35	0.0	▼0.6
Humanists					33	0.0	
Informal votes		794			544		
Total valid votes		86,477			86,727		
Turnout		87,271	70.8	▲7.0			
CDU hold	Majority	18,553	21.5	▲16.7			

=== 2021 election ===
State election (2026): Aalen
Party	Candidate	Votes	%	±%
CDU	Winfried Mack	23,076	29.8	▼5.6
Greens	Alexander Asbrock	19,353	25.0	▼0.9
SPD	Carola Merk-Rudolph	7,738	10.0	▼2.0
FW	Franz Josef Grill	7,530	9.7	
AfD	Jan-Hendrik Czada	7,352	9.5	▼5.0
FDP	Manuel Reiger	7,060	9.1	▲2.9
Left	Justin Niebius	2,091	2.7	▼0.4
PARTEI	Marcel Christof	921	1.2	
dieBasis	Karlheinz Siegmund	721	0.9	
WiR2020	Franz Josef Gruber	486	0.6	
KlimalisteBW	Christoph Haberl	466	0.6	
Volt	Anne Lobecke	319	0.4	
ÖDP	Matthias Wolff	311	0.4	▼0.2
Majority		3,723	4.8	
Rejected ballots		579	0.7	▼0.4
Turnout		78,003	63.9	▼6.7
Registered electors		122,157		
CDU hold		Swing		

== See also ==
- Politics of Baden-Württemberg
- Landtag of Baden-Württemberg
