= Schwäbische Post =

German newspaper in Baden-Württemberg

The Schwäbische Post is a local daily newspaper for Ostalbkreis. It is published by the media conglomerate SDZ Druck und Medien GmbH & Co. KG in Aalen. It uses the outer jacket or Mantel (the national section of a regional newspaper) composed by the editorial department of Südwest Presse in Ulm. SDZ Druck und Medien has 312 employees, including graphic designers, salesmen for both digital and print, IT systems support specialists, economists, editorial volunteers and 30 editors.

== History ==
On 29 January 1837, two Schwäbisch Gmünd booksellers, Johannes Raach and Philip Jakob Andreas Buck, founded Aalen's first newspaper, the Bote von Aalen. In 1853, Ludwig Gottlob Stierlin was awarded the publication rights for the Bote von Aalen:Amts- und Intelligenz-Blatts Oberamtsbezirk Aalen, renamed to Kocherzeitung in 1873.

In 1933, the National Socialist Press (NS Presse) became the majority shareholder under Gleichschaltung. They renamed the paper Kocher- und Nationalzeitung. The final issue was printed on 17 May 1945.

On 25 February 1948, John Binkowski and Konrad Theiss applied for a license at the Office of Military Government, United States for the newly established publisher Süddeutsche Zeitung to print the Schwäbischen Post – Zeitung für den Kreis Aalen newspaper for the region of Baden-Württemberg.

In order to emphasize continuous news service for Aalen since 1837, Süddeutsche Zeitung reassigned both the book publishing rights of WA Stierlin and the publishing rights for the Kocherzeitung to the Schwäbische Post.

== Circulation and Distribution Area ==
The daily total paid circulation of the Swabian post in 2020 is 24,179 copies.

The distribution area of the Swabian post includes the county seat Aalen with suburbs Unterkochen, Ebnat, Waldhausen, Dewangen, Wasseralfingen, Mayrhofen and Fachsenfeld, the municipality of Abtsgmuend with its district of Untergröningen, Ellwangen with the suburbs of Schrezheim, Rindelbach, Röhlingen and Pfahlheim, Bopfingen with the suburbs of Unterriffingen, Trochtelfingen, Aufhausen, Oberdorf, Kerkingen and Baldern, Neresheim with the suburbs of Elchingen, Dorfmerkingen, Kösingen, Stetten, Schweindorf, Hohlenstein and Ohmenheim, Lauchheim with suburbs Rottingen and Hülen, Oberkochen, Kirchheim am Ries and Riesbürg.

== Other media activities by SDZ Druck und Medien ==
- 1961: Opened a Schwäpo shop in Aalen
- 1986: Spun off their Department of Information Technology as the subsidiary Theiss & Binkowski Aalen GmbH & Co. KG Data Center
- 1992: Founded a business newspaper for the Ostwürttemberg regional economy.
- 1995: Collaborated with a Fraunhofer Institute in Stuttgart to produce a multimedia catalog for DSM (Digital Sales Marketing). They developed the service mark SDZeCOM, which was spun off as an independent subsidiary in 2008
- 2000: Founded Digitaldruck (www.digitaldruckdeutschland.de/) and its subsidiary DigitalDruck Aalen (known as DigitalDruck Deutschland since April 2007)
- July 2001: 1. Started the Ostalb Mail GmbH & Co. KG, a private service for business mail
- January 2009: Began sponsoring the city magazine XAVER (www.xaver.de)
