= Georg Brunnhuber =

German politician

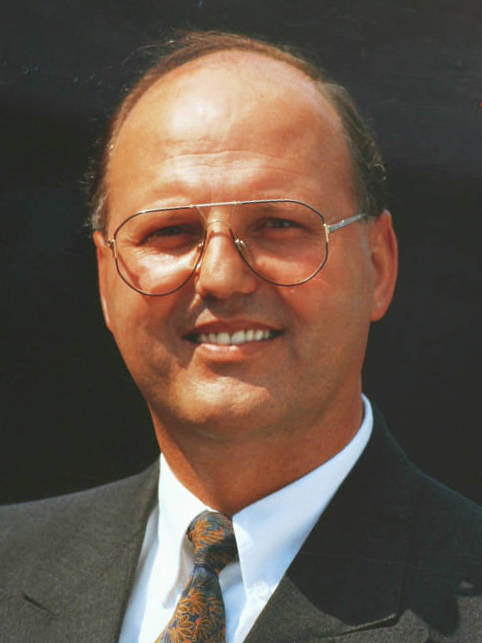
- Brunnhuber in 1990

Member of the Bundestag; for Aalen – Heidenheim
- In office 20 December 1990 – 27 October 2009
- Preceded by: Manfred Abelein
- Succeeded by: Roderich Kiesewetter

Personal details
- Born: 18 February 1948 (age 78) Oberkochen, Germany
- Party: Christian Democratic Union
- Children: 2
- Education: HFT Stuttgart

Georg Brunnhuber (born 18 February 1948) is a German politician of the Christian Democratic Union (CDU). He served as a member of the German parliament, the Bundestag, from 1990 until 2009, having been elected in the 1990, 1994, 1998, 2002 and 2005 federal elections.

He represented the constituency of Ostwürttemberg (eastern Württemberg), that consists of the districts of Heidenheim and Ostalbkreis in eastern Baden-Württemberg, and was the leader of the parliamentary group of the CDU representatives from Baden-Württemberg. As a member of parliament, he served on the committee for transport and the committee for construction and housing, and was deputy spokesman for transport of the CDU/CSU parliamentary group. From 2005, he was spokesman of the leaders of the CDU state groups of representatives, and a member of the executive committee of the CDU/CSU parliamentary group. In 2008, he made public that he would not stand for reelection in 2009. He was succeeded in 2009 by Roderich Kiesewetter.

Brunnhuber serves on the supervisory board of Deutsche Bahn.

Georg Brunnhuber is an engineer by profession. He is Catholic, married and has two daughters.
