= Unterschneidheim =

- Municipality
- Coat of arms

- Location of Unterschneidheim within Ostalbkreis district
- Interactive map of Unterschneidheim
- Location within Germany Location within Baden-Württemberg
- Coordinates: 48°56′30″N 10°21′56″E
- Country: Germany
- State: Baden-Württemberg
- Admin. region: Stuttgart
- District: Ostalbkreis

Government
  - Mayor (2021–29): Johannes Joas (Greens)

Area
  - Total: 68.07 km^{2} (26.28 sq mi)
- Elevation: 487 m (1,598 ft)

Population (2025-12-31)
  - Total: 5,035
  - Density: 73.97/km^{2} (191.6/sq mi)
- Time zone: UTC+01:00 (CET)
  - Summer (DST): UTC+02:00 (CEST)
- Postal codes: 73485
- Dialling codes: 07966
- Vehicle registration: AA
- Website: www.unterschneidheim.de

Unterschneidheim is a municipality in the German state of Baden-Württemberg, in Ostalbkreis district.

== Geography ==
=== Location ===
Unterschneidheim is located in the valley of the Schneidheimer Sechta, approximately 20 kilometres east of Ellwangen. It lies at the edge of the Nördlinger Ries and borders Bavaria.

The European watershedruns through Unterschneidheim – The Schneidheimer Sechta flows towards the Danube and therefore the Black Sea, whereas the river Jagst, which has its official source in Walxheim, a part of Unterschneidheim, flows towards the Neckar and therefore to the Rhine and the North Sea.

=== Neighbouring places ===
In the North, the municipality borders Tannhausen, in the East it borders the Bavarian municipalities Fremdingen and Marktoffingen. To the South of Unterschneidheim there is Kirchheim am Ries and Bopfingen, to the Southwest Westhausen and to the West Ellwangen.

=== Municipal subdivision ===
The municipality of Unterschneidheim consists of 17 villages, hamlets, farmsteads and houses, many of which had formerly been independent municipalities. To the former municipality of Geislingen belongs the village of Geislingen as well as the abandoned village Stetten. The former municipality Nordhausen consists of the village Nordhausen and the hamlet Harthausen. To the former municipality Unterwilflingen belongs the village of Unterwilflingen as well as the hamlet Oberwilflingen, the former municipality Walxheim consists of the village Walxheim and the hamlet Hundslohe. Before 1973, when the first villages were added to the municipality, Unterschneidheim consisted of the village Unterschneidheim, the hamlet Oberschenidheim and the abandoned hamlet Haghof. Part of the former municipality Zipplingen are the village of Zipplingen, hamlets Sechtenhausen and Wössingen, as well as the departed village Rainhof. Part of the former municipality Zöbingen are the village Zöbingen, the hamlet Wöhrsberg, the farms Greuthof and Haidmühle, the house Jägerhaus, as well as the departed villages Stetten, Heroltaych, Fallmeisterei, and Ziegelhütte.

Coat of arms of the districts:

Geislingen

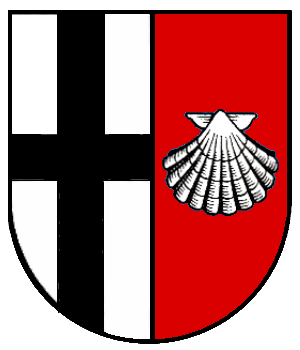
Nordhausen

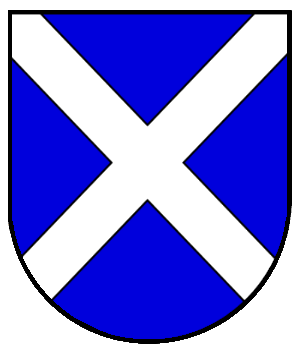
Unterwilflingen

Walxheim

Zipplingen

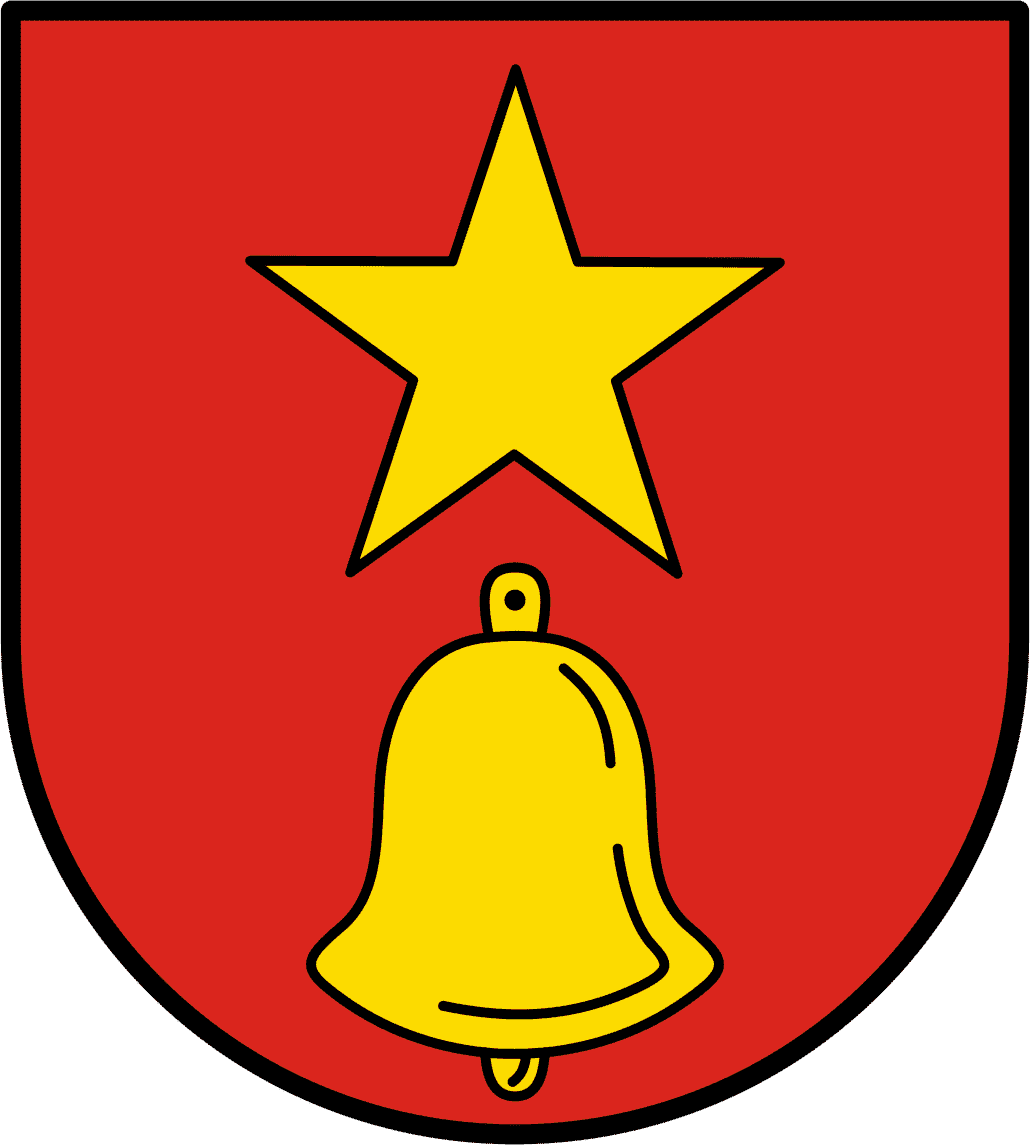
Zöbingen

=== Area layout ===
Created with data from the statistical office of Baden-Württemberg, as of 2014.

== History ==
=== Up until the 19th Century ===
Unterschneidheim was first mentioned around the year 800 in the Traditiones Fuldenses, which contain descriptions of goods of the monastery in Fulda. In the Middle Ages, it was the domicile of a bailiwick of the Teutonic Order. Thus, the village was later a subordinate to the Teutonic Order as well as the house of Oettingen-Wallerstein. Many other houses also had property in Unterschneidheim through the centuries. Because of secularization and mediatization, Unterschneidheim became part of the Kingdom of Bavaria at the beginning of the 19th century. After the border treaty of 1810, it became part of the Kingdom of Württemberg. In 1810, Unterschneidheim had a population of 735 people, while Oberschneidheim had 301 inhabitants.

=== Administrative history ===
Since the beginning of the 19th century, Unterschneidheim was subject of the Oberamt Ellwangen. After the Kreisreform during the Nazi period in Württemberg, it became part of the Landkreis Aalen in 1939. Because the village became part of the American occupation zone after World War II, Unterschneidheim was a part of the newly founded federal state Württemberg-Baden, which became Baden-Württemberg in the year 1952. After the Kreisreform on 1 January 1973, Unterschneidheim became part of the new Ostalbkreis.

== Incorporations ==
On 1 January 1974, the previously independent municipalities Geislingen, Nordhausen, Unterwilfingen und Walxheim, as well as Zöbingen on 1 January 1975, were merged into Unterschneidheim. The present-day parish was formed due to a merger of the municipalities of Unterschneidheim and Zipplingen on 1 January 1975.

== Religions ==
There is a Catholic Church in the town centre, in Nordhausen, Geislingen, Unterwilfingen, Zöbingen, Zipplingen, Sechtenhausen and Wössingen, while there is a Protestant Church in Walxheim.

== Politics ==
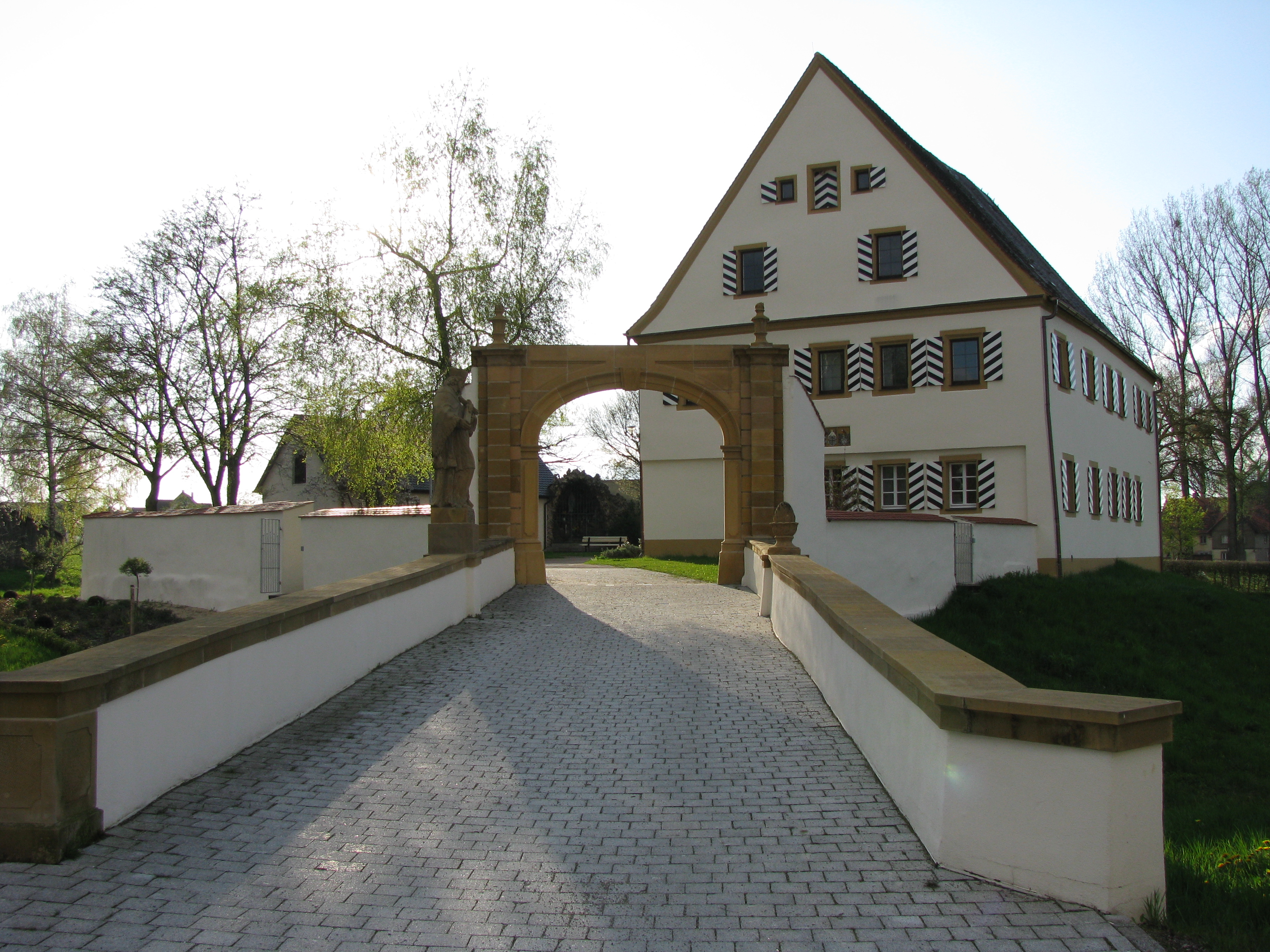
former town hall Unterschneidheim

=== Administrative cooperation ===
The municipality is a member of the community administration cooperation of Tannhausen based in Tannhausen.

=== Municipal council ===
The municipal council election on 9 June 2024, yielded the following result with a voter turnout of 71.4% (+2%):

- CDU 44.85% (-27%) – 8 seats
- FBL (Freie Bürgerliste Unterschneidheim) 37.3% (+9.2%) – 6 seats
- MNH (Gemeinschaft Mensch Natur Heimat) 14.94% (+14.94%) – 3 seats
- Unabhängiger Wähler Siegfried Wascheck 2.91% (+2.91%) – 1 seat

=== Mayor ===
In the mayoral election on 5 April 2009, Nikolaus Ebert was confirmed for a second term with 98.08 percent of the valid votes cast, with a voter turnout of 57.6 percent and no opposing candidates. On 25 April 2021, Johannes Joas (Green party) was elected the new mayor with 65.05 percent of the votes.

=== International relations ===
Unterschneidheim has maintained a partnership with the city of Volvic in the Auvergne region of France since 1988 and with the municipality of Krumhermersdorf in the Erzgebirge region of Saxony since 1989.

== Culture and landmarks ==
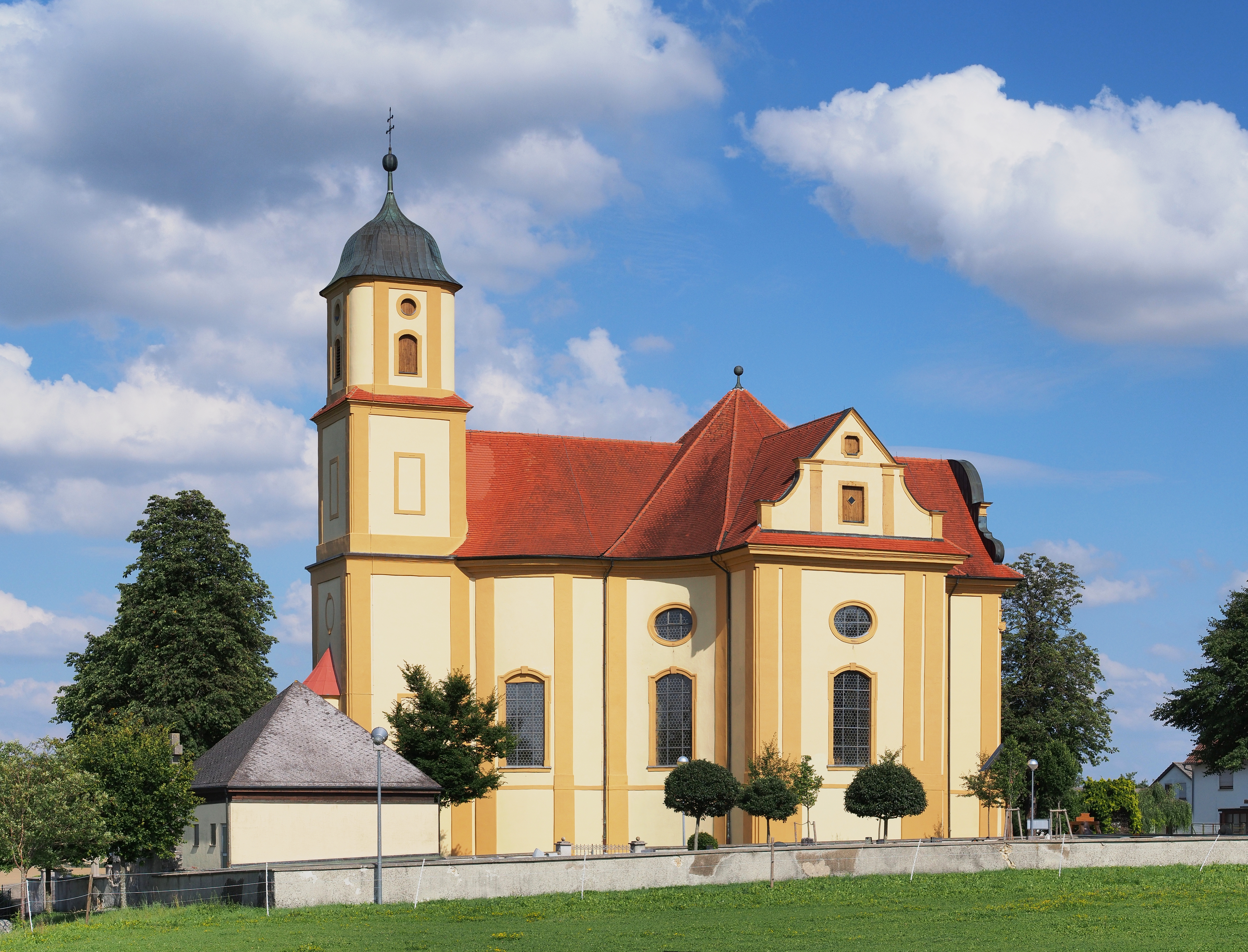
Wallfahrtskirche St. Marien, Zöbingen

=== Buildings ===
- Unterschneidheim Castle (Town Hall until October 2023)
- St. Peter and Paul Parish Church, Unterschneidheim (Catholic)
- St. Nikolaus Parish Church, Geislingen (Catholic)
- St. Nikolaus Parish Church, Sechtenhausen (Catholic)
- St. Bonifatius Parish Church, Wössingen (Catholic)
- St. Martin Parish Church, Zipplingen (Catholic)
- St. Mauritius Parish Church, Zöbingen (Catholic)
- Leonhard Chapel, Oberwilflingen
- Maria-Hilf Chapel, Unterwilflingen
- St. Marien Pilgrimage Church (Marien Chapel), Zöbingen. In the sacristy of the pilgrimage church, no German tree-trunk coffin can be visited.
- Evangelical Church, Walxheim

=== Memorial sites ===
Since 1945, there has been a memorial erected in the cemetery of the Zöbingen district by the Polish survivors of the concentration camps. 42 concentration camp victims of ‘Hessentaler Death Marches’ were buried here, who in the spring of 1945 were murdered during a break by SS men, near Zöbingen. In 1968, they were reburied in the Kochendorf concentration camp cemetery.

== Economy and infrastructure ==
Unterschneidheim is not purely a residential community. There are around 700 jobs in Unterschneidheim, though more than 1300 employees make their living outside of the community.

=== Traffic ===
The Unterschneidheim-Walxheim airfield is located approximately 1 km north of the Walxheim area.

=== Education ===
In Unterschneidheim there is a primary school and two secondary schools – Werkrealschule and Realschule (the first focusing on more practical subjects and the later that focuses on more typical subjects). In the districts of Zipplingen and Zöbingen, there is another primary school. As well as this, there is a total of five Kindergartens as well as a crèche. There are other secondary schools available in neighbouring towns.

== People ==
=== People of note from the area ===
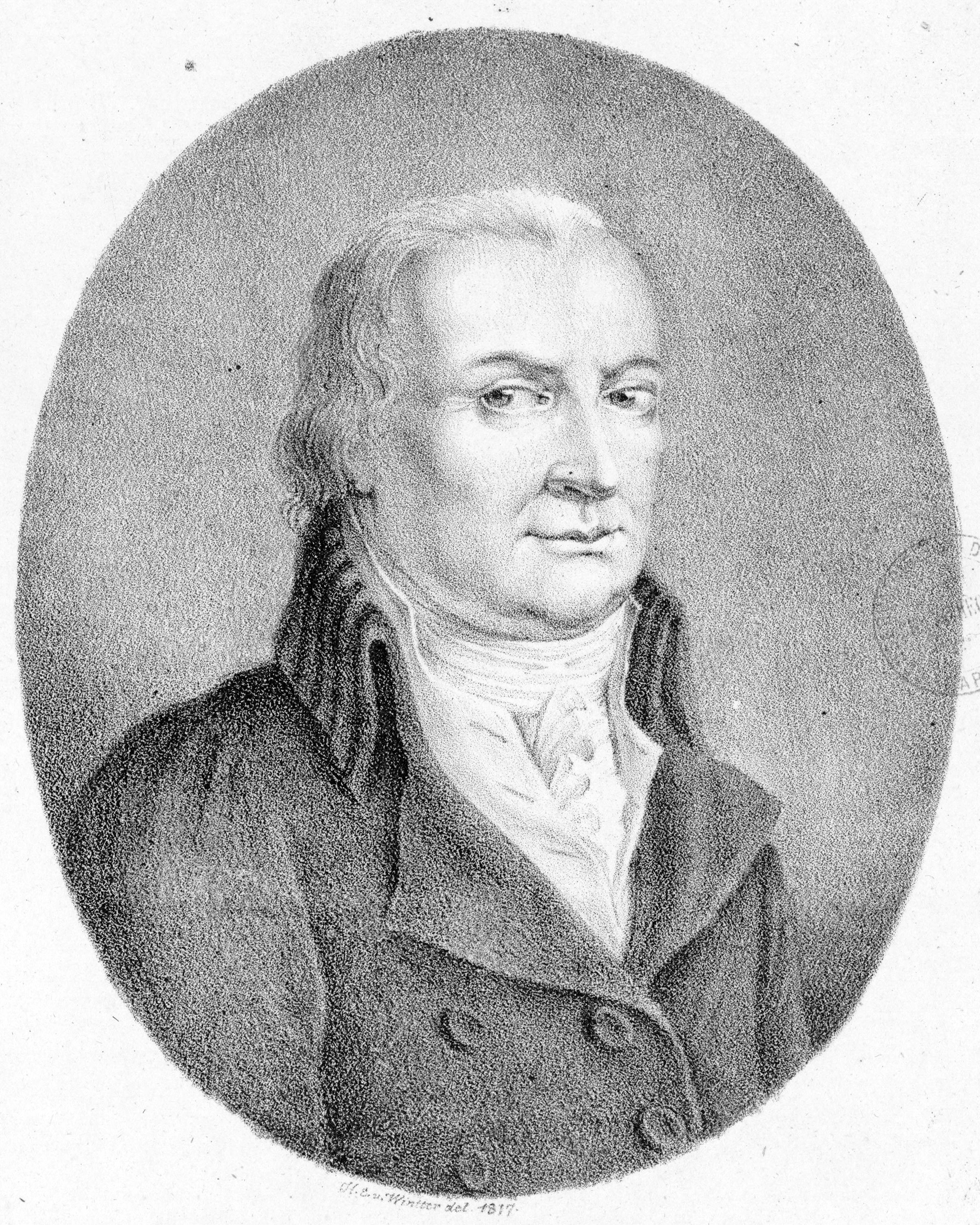
Franz Bühler in 1817

- Nikolaus Thoman (1457-1545), born in Zipplingen, a chronicler of Weißenhorn
- Franz Bühler (1760-1823), born in Unterschneidheim, religious name Gregor, companist and cathedral choir conductor in Augsburg
- Karl Hahn (*1937), born in Zipplingen, political scientist
- Paul Nagler (1925-2018), born in Unterschneidheim, architect
- Nikolaus Stark (*1931), born in Geislingen, Roman Catholic priest and artist
- Franz Lemmermeyer (*1962), born in Zipplingen, mathematician and historian of mathematics
