= Marie Daiber =

German-born Swiss zoologist (1868–1928)

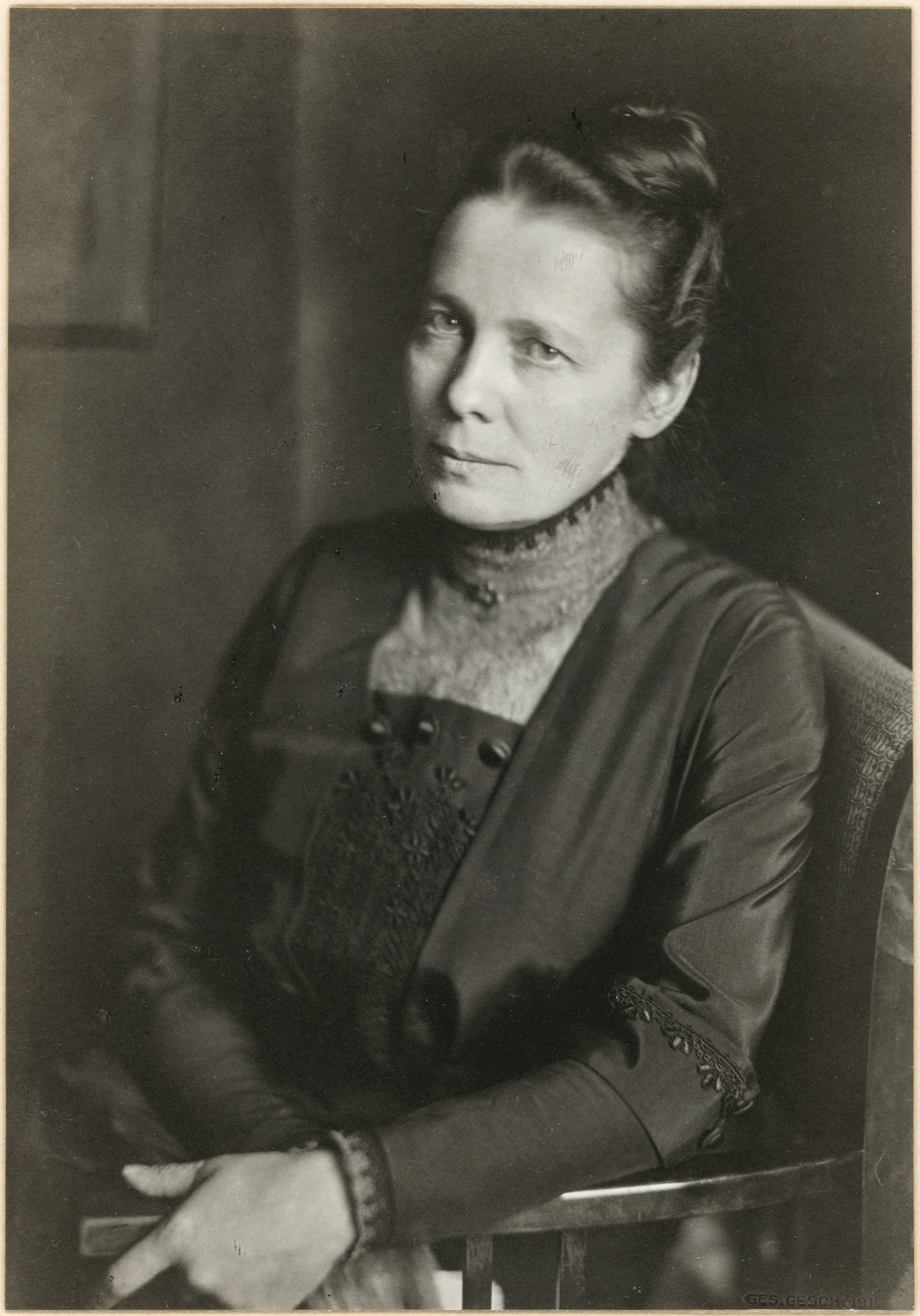
- Daiber (1914, University of Zurich)
- Born: 24 August 1868; Esslingen (Württemberg), Germany
- Died: 6 July 1928 (aged 59); Genoa, Italy
- Burial place: 2. Swiss
- Education: University of Zurich
- Occupations: Zoologist, professor

Marie Daiber (24 August 1868 – 6 July 1928) was a German-born Swiss zoologist. In 1913 she was the first woman to obtain a teaching certification at the Philosophical Faculty II of the University of Zurich. After earning her PhD she became a professor at that same university.

== Biography ==
Marie Daiber was born in Esslingen (Württemberg) and spent her youth in Stuttgart, Germany, where her father taught science at Katharinenstift since 1870. She attended that same school followed by the associated teacher training college where she graduated in 1888. Then she worked as a private teacher for ten years. She began university language studies in Oxford, England, before enrolling in science at the University of Zurich, Switzerland, in 1899. In 1904, Marie Daiber received her doctorate under the Swiss naturalist Arnold Lang and eventually became a naturalized Swiss citizen. In the same year she took up an assistant position at the Zoological Institute of the University of Zurich. She also worked at the bibliographic resource for researchers called the Concilium Bibliographicum. She was promoted to prosector of the Zoological Institute in 1909 and she held that position until her death.

In 1913, Marie Daiber qualified as a professor at the University of Zurich and was given a teaching post for comparative embryology. Beginning in 1914, she was also entrusted with the zootomical-microscopic training course. In recognition of her services to the Zoological Institute, she was appointed a professor in 1922. She received credit for writing many chapters in the volume Anthropoda of Arnold Lang's Handbook of Invertebrate Morphology, and she was involved in Lang' research in the field of experimental genetics.

Marie Daiber died at 59 on 6 July 1928 in Genoa, Italy, after a long illness.

== Selected works ==
- Daiber, Marie. Contributions to the knowledge of the ovaries of Bacillus rossii FaBR. together with some biological remarks. 1904.
- Daiber, Marie, and assistant at the zoological-comparative anatomical laboratory. On the question of the origin and regenerative capacity of the spleen. Jen. Zeitschr. für Naturwiss (1907).
- Jordan, Hermann, Marie Daiber, Johannis Strohl, Leo Zürcher, and Herbert Haviland Field. Bibliographia physiologica: (adhuc diario" Zentralblatt für physiologie: adnexa). Vol. 8. sumptibus Concilii bibliographici, 1913.
- Daiber, Marie. Arachnoidea. G. Fischer, 1913.
- Daiber, Marie. The abdominal rib system of Sphenodon Hatteria punctatus Gray. G. Fischer, 1920.

== See also ==
- Women in science
- Concilium Bibliographicum
- Embryology
- Comparative anatomy
