= Tannhausen =

- Municipality
- Coat of arms

- Location of Tannhausen within Ostalbkreis district
- Interactive map of Tannhausen
- Location within Germany Location within Baden-Württemberg
- Coordinates: 48°58′45″N 10°21′41″E
- Country: Germany
- State: Baden-Württemberg
- Admin. region: Stuttgart
- District: Ostalbkreis

Government
  - Mayor (2022–30): Siegfried Czerwinski

Area
  - Total: 17.74 km^{2} (6.85 sq mi)
- Elevation: 504 m (1,654 ft)

Population (2025-12-31)
  - Total: 1,776
  - Density: 100.1/km^{2} (259.3/sq mi)
- Time zone: UTC+01:00 (CET)
  - Summer (DST): UTC+02:00 (CEST)
- Postal codes: 73497
- Dialling codes: 07964
- Vehicle registration: AA
- Website: www.tannhausen.de

Tannhausen is a municipality in the German state of Baden-Württemberg, in Ostalbkreis district.

Tannhausen is located approximately 20 km (12 mi) east of Ellwangen at the edge of the Nördlinger Ries in Swabian Württemberg close to the border of the Franconian part of Bavaria, where the administrative region of Swabian Bavaria meets Central Franconia.

== Nearby Municipalities ==
The boundaries of the municipality are located in the north onto Stödtlen, in the east onto the bavarian municipalities Wilburgstetten (rural district of Ansbach, central Franconia), and Fremdingen (rural district of Donau-Ries, Swabia), in the south onto Unterschneidheim and in the far west onto the city area of Ellwangen.

== Structure ==
Next to the main village of Tannhausen, six more communities belong to the municipality, Riepach, Bleichroden, Sederndorf, Hagenbucherhof, Bergheim, and Ellrichsbronn.

== History ==
Tannhausen was first documented in 1100. At this time the local Nobility, the Lords of Thannhausen had already resided in their castle and are still present there today. It is assumed that the famous mediaeval minnesinger and poet Tannhäuser was an offspring of this family.

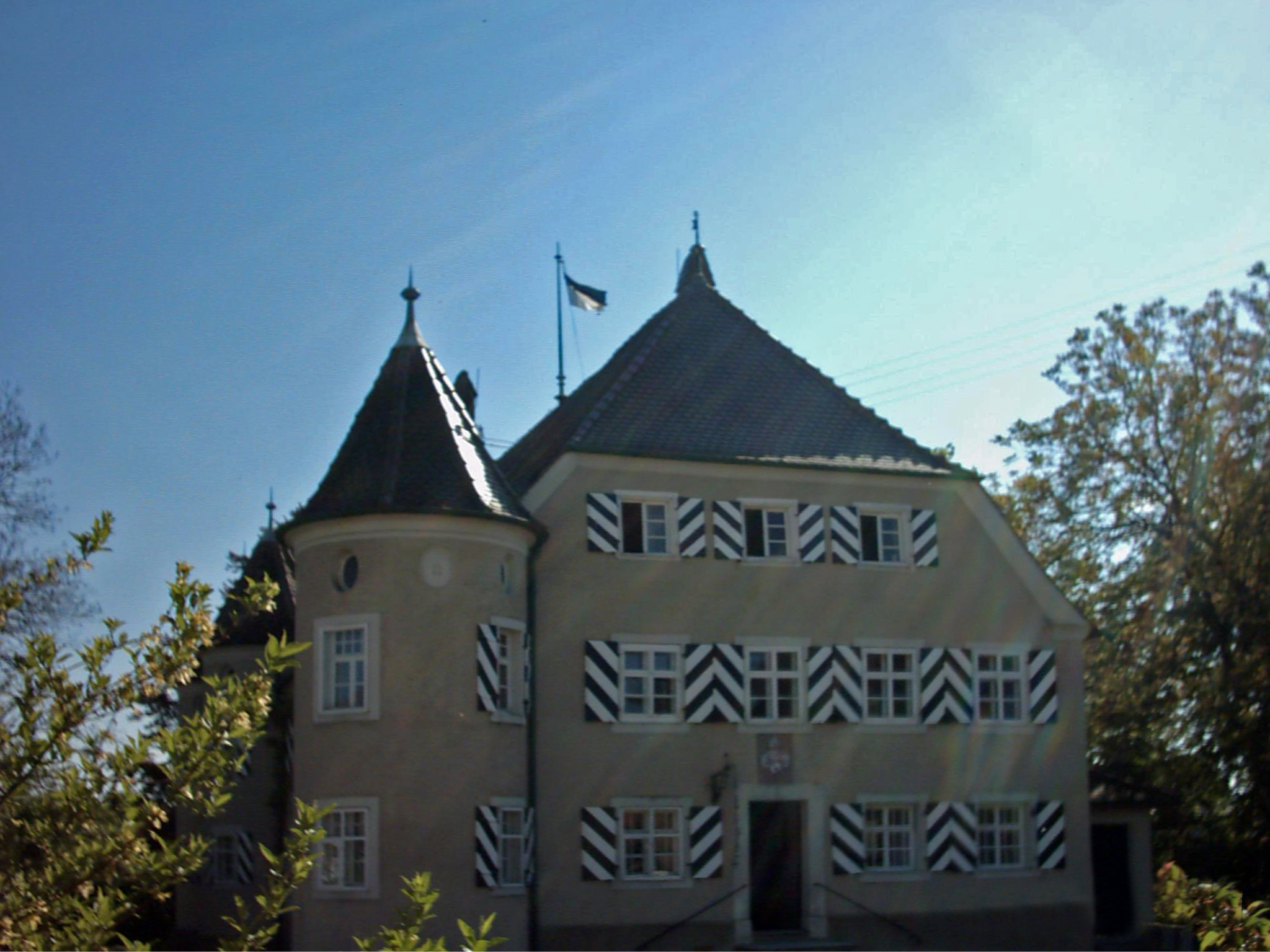
Tannhausen castle

Next to the local Nobilility, Tannhausen had also several clerical and worldly dignitaries, which had the use of some authority in the village. During German mediatisation in 1806, Tannhausen belonged to the State of Bavaria; however, it became later a part of the Duchy of Württemberg on January 12, 1810.

The village of Tannhausen was formerly spelled as Thannhausen with an h identical to the name of the local noble family, nevertheless the name was changed during a spelling reform in 1903 to Tannhausen, which excluded the h.

== Economy and Infra-Structure ==
Tannhausen is not only a living community, but it also offers 300 local jobs. Even though, approximately 500 people are having to go to work outside of the village. Regardless, Agriculture is still playing a big part.

Tannhausen has one retirement home, offering living accommodations and geriatric care for 130 elderly people.

== Politics ==
The municipality is headquarters of the administrative association of Tannhausen, Stödtlen, and Unterschneidheim.

== Education ==
Tannhausen has only one primary school. All of the other schools used by children of the locality are located in Unterschneidheim, Bopfingen or Ellwangen.

== Notable people ==
- Wilhelm Bauberger (1809-1883), novelist
