= Manfred Abelein =

German politician (1930–2008)

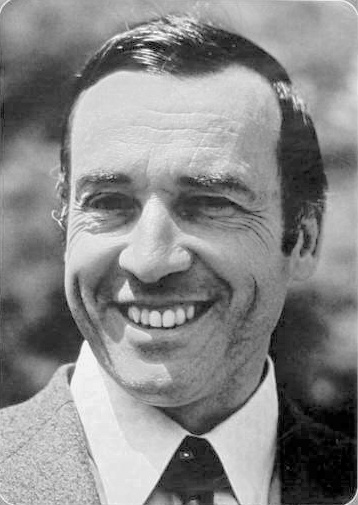

Member of the Bundestag; for Aalen – Heidenheim
- In office 19 October 1965 – 20 December 1990
- Preceded by: Constituency established
- Succeeded by: Georg Brunnhuber

Personal details
- Born: 20 October 1930 Stuttgart, Germany
- Died: 17 January 2008 (aged 77) Ellwangen, Germany
- Party: Christian Democratic Union

Manfred Abelein (20 October 1930 – 17 January 2008) was a German politician. He was a representative of the Christian Democratic Union.

== Education and Work ==
Abelein graduated with a degree in law, political science and economics. He later worked as a professor at the University of Regensburg, where he taught politics and public law. He was well known for his regular course on "The Current Problems in Fiscal Policy".

== Member of Parliament ==
Abelein was a member of the German Bundestag from 1965, when he succeeded Rudolf Vogel, until 1990. He represented the constituency of Aalen – Heidenheim in Baden-Württemberg, and received over 50% of the votes every time he ran for election. In an article in the German newspaper Die Zeit, he presented himself as a conservative politician. He was replaced in office by Georg Brunnhuber in 1990, who held the seat until 2009.

Abelein was also a member of the NATO Parliamentary Assembly, of which he was vice-president from 1985 to 1987.

== Mountain Climber and Pilot ==
Abelein was a passionate mountain climber. In 1977, while on a trip to help set up the Konrad Adenauer Foundation in South America, he climbed Mount Illimani (6,438m) in Bolivia. He also climbed the Hohe Munde (2,662m) in Austria in 1978. Between March and May 1980 he participated in the first European expedition to Tibet for many years, which climbed Mount Shishapangma (8,013m), the fourteenth highest mountain in the world.

A trained pilot, Abelein flew non-stop from New York City to Cologne in 1979.

== See also ==
- List of German Christian Democratic Union politicians
