= Schneidheimer Sechta =

River in Germany

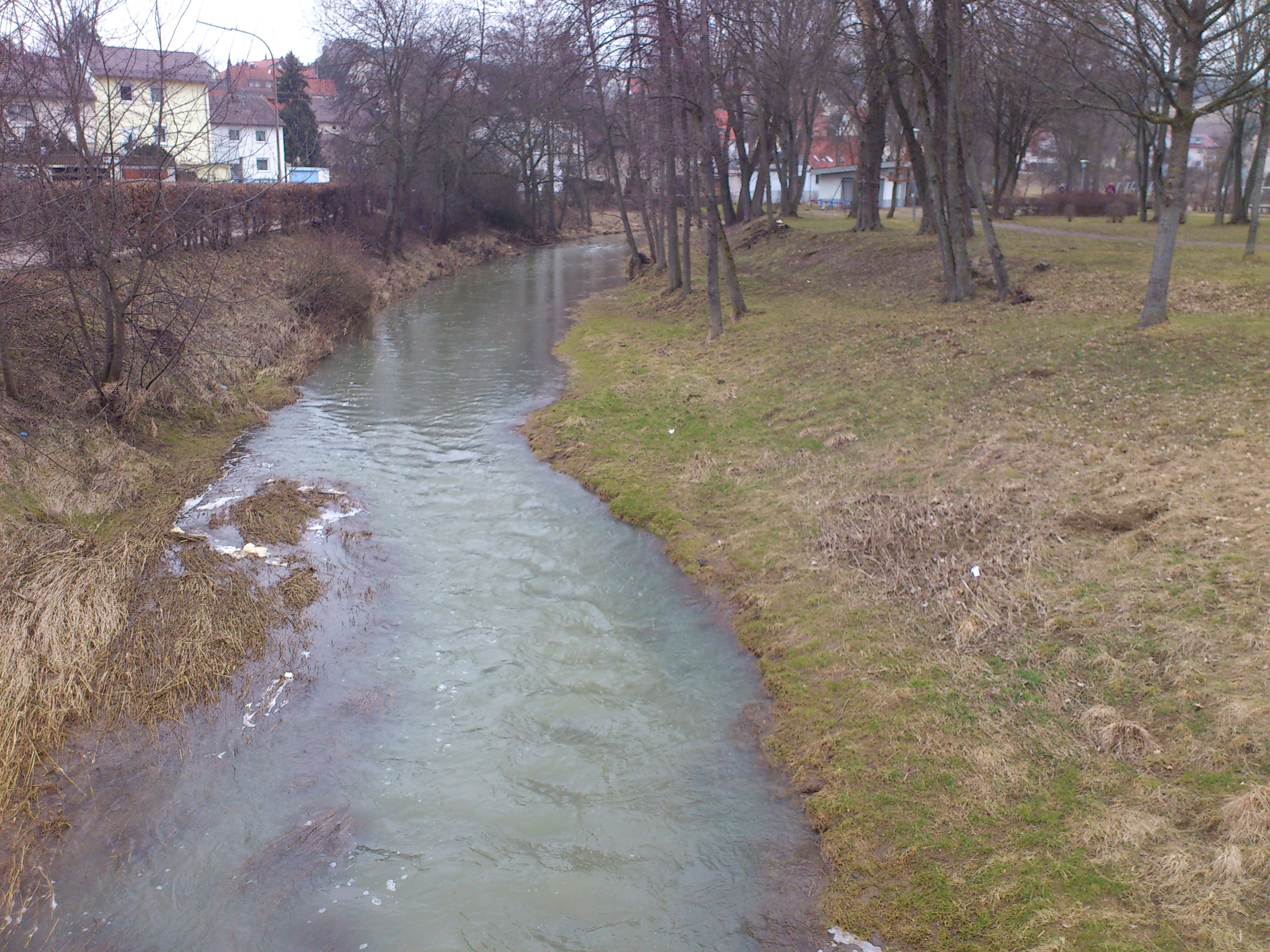

Location
- Country: Germany
- State: Baden-Württemberg

Physical characteristics
- Mouth
  - location: Eger
  - coordinates: 48.8640°N 10.3497°E
- Length: 21.5 km (13.4 mi)

Basin features
- Progression: Eger→ Wörnitz→ Danube→ Black Sea

Schneidheimer Sechta is a river of Baden-Württemberg, Germany. It passes through Unterschneidheim and flows into the Eger in Bopfingen.

== See also ==
- List of rivers of Baden-Württemberg
