= Hubert Wolf =

German historian (born 1959)

Hubert Wolf (born 26 November 1959 in Wört, Baden-Württemberg) is a German church historian and professor at the University of Münster. He was awarded a Gottfried Wilhelm Leibniz Prize in 2003. In 2006, he was awarded the Gutenberg Prize of the International Gutenberg Society and the City of Mainz.

After his Abitur in 1978, he studied Roman Catholic theology at the University of Tübingen and LMU Munich. He was ordained to the priesthood in 1985. In 1992, he became professor at the Goethe University Frankfurt, and moved to the University of Münster in 1999.

His books include Pope and Devil: The Vatican's Archives and the Third Reich, a study of the relationship between the Vatican and Adolf Hitler's administration in Germany. Die Nonnen von Sant'Ambrogio (The Nuns of Sant'Ambrogio, translated into French as Le Vice et la Grâce) describes a 19th-century religious scandal at Sant'Ambrogio della Massima.
