= Wört =

- Municipality
- Coat of arms

- Location of Wört within Ostalbkreis district
- Interactive map of Wört
- Location within Germany Location within Baden-Württemberg
- Coordinates: 49°01′56″N 10°16′21″E
- Country: Germany
- State: Baden-Württemberg
- Admin. region: Stuttgart
- District: Ostalbkreis

Government
  - Mayor (2018–26): Thomas Saur

Area
  - Total: 18.17 km^{2} (7.02 sq mi)
- Elevation: 455 m (1,493 ft)

Population (2025-12-31)
  - Total: 1,505
  - Density: 82.83/km^{2} (214.5/sq mi)
- Time zone: UTC+01:00 (CET)
  - Summer (DST): UTC+02:00 (CEST)
- Postal codes: 73499
- Dialling codes: 07964
- Vehicle registration: AA
- Website: www.gemeinde-woert.de

Wört (German pronunciation: [ˈvœʁt]) is a municipality (German: Gemeinde) and town in the district of Ostalbkreis in Baden-Württemberg in Germany.

== Geography ==
=== Location ===
Wört is located in the valley of the Rotach, a tributary of the Wörnitz River, in the Virngrund region. It is in the northeastern foothills of the Swabian Alb range, between Dinkelsbühl (6 km) and Ellwangen (13 km).

=== Neighboring Towns ===
The municipality is bordered to the north by Fichtenau, part of Schwäbisch Hall district, to the east by the Bavarian city of Dinkelsbühl, to the south by Stödtlen and to the west by Ellenberg.

=== Land Use ===
According to the Baden-Württemberg Statistics Office, the total area of the municipality is 18.17 km^{2} (7.02 sq mi), of which 8.13 km^{2} (45%) is woodland, 7.67 km^{2} (42%) is agricultural, 0.9 km^{2} (5%) is buildings, 0.74 km^{2} (4%) is for transportation, 0.62 km^{2} (3.5%) is water and 0.09 km^{2} (0.5%) is for recreational use.

== Notable residents ==
It is the birthplace of church historian Hubert Wolf (born 1959).
