= Roderich Kiesewetter =

German politician

Roderich Kiesewetter MdB
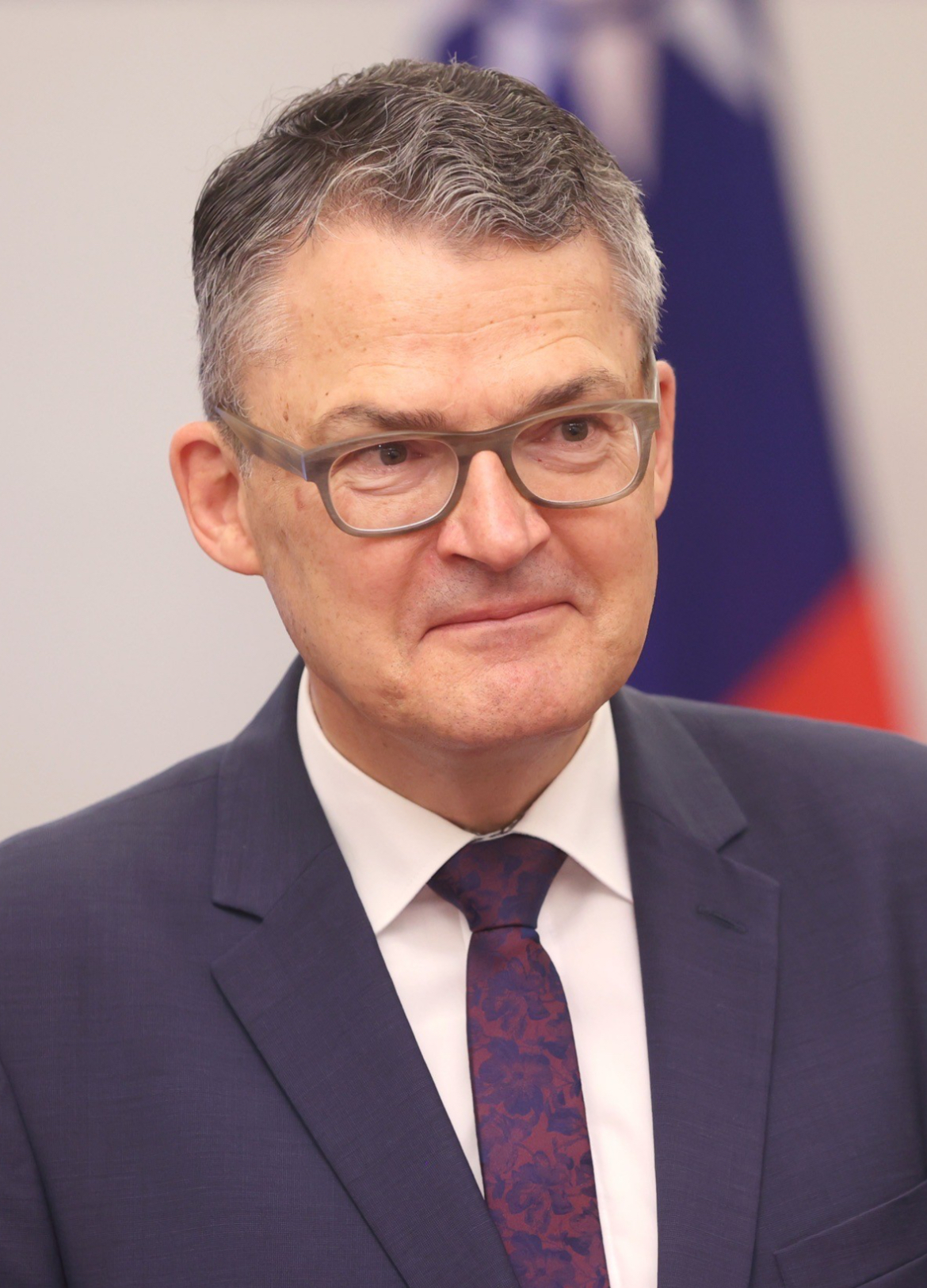
- Kiesewetter in 2024

Member of the Bundestag; for Aalen – Heidenheim
- Incumbent
- Assumed office 27 October 2009
- Preceded by: Georg Brunnhuber

Personal details
- Born: 11 September 1963 (age 63) Pfullendorf, Baden-Württemberg, West Germany (now Germany)
- Party: Christian Democratic Union (since 1981)
- Children: 2
- Education: University of the Bundeswehr Munich; University of Texas at Austin

Roderich Kiesewetter (born 11 September 1963) is a former Bundeswehr general staff officer and politician of the Christian Democratic Union (CDU) who has been serving as a member of the German Bundestag since 2009.

== Early life and career ==
After passing the German Abitur examination in 1982, Kiesewetter joined the German military artillery forces. From 1983 until 1986, he studied economics and organizational sciences at the University of the Bundeswehr Munich and the University of Texas at Austin. From 1995 to 1997, he attended the German General Staff Course at the Führungsakademie der Bundeswehr in Hamburg, being awarded the Heusinger prize for the best German graduate.

Having finished the studies in Hamburg, Kiesewetter was posted at the European Council, the NATO Headquarters in Brussels and Mons as well as in the German Ministry of Defence. Besides that, he also used to be commander of a German army battalion and took part in different military missions abroad. From 2006 to 2009, he was head of the offices of the then Chiefs of Staff of the Supreme Headquarters Allied Powers Europe, Rainer Schuwirth and Karl-Heinz Lather in SHAPE/Mons, Belgium. In 2009, he had a post at the Rapid Reaction Forces Operations Command (Kommando operative Führung Eingreifkräfte), until he was elected member of parliament on 17 October 2009 and left the army as a colonel.

== Political career ==
Kiesewetter has been a member of the German Bundestag since the 2009 federal elections.

In the Bundestag, Kiesewetter is a member of the Committee on Foreign Affairs as well as deputy chairman of the Sub-Committee for Disarmament, Arms Control and Non-Proliferation. In his parliamentary group he serves as spokesman for disarmament and on civilian crisis prevention. Within the Committee on Foreign Affairs, he is his group's rapporteur on the Balkans, the Mediterranean and Maghreb countries; he previously also covered energy policy.

In the negotiations to form a coalition government following the 2013 federal elections, Kiesewetter was part of the CDU/CSU delegation in the working group on foreign affairs, defense policy and development cooperation, led by Thomas de Maizière and Frank-Walter Steinmeier. Between 2014 and 2015, Kiesewetter represented the CDU/CSU parliamentary group in a crossparty committee headed by former defense minister Volker Rühe to review the country's parliamentary rules on military deployments. From April 2014, he served as member of the German Parliamentary Committee investigating the NSA spying scandal; he resigned from the body in January 2015, citing an increased need to focus on his duties in the Committee on Foreign Affairs.

In addition to his committee assignments, Kiesewetter is a member of the Parliamentary Friendship Group for Relations with Bosnia and Herzegovina. Since 2019, he has been a member of the German delegation to the Franco-German Parliamentary Assembly.

In February 2013, Kiesewetter accompanied President of the Bundestag Norbert Lammert to Morocco for meetings with the president of the House of Representatives, Karim Ghellab, the President of the Assembly of Councillors, Mohamed Cheikh Biadillah, Prime Minister Abdelilah Benkirane, and Foreign Minister Saad-Eddine El Othmani. In early 2015, he joined Germany's Foreign Minister Frank-Walter Steinmeier on official trips to Morocco, Tunisia and Algeria; later that year, he also accompanied him on a trip to Cuba; it was the first time a German foreign minister had visited the country since German reunification in 1990.

== Political positions ==
=== Domestic politics ===
Ahead of the Christian Democrats’ leadership election in 2018, Kiesewetter publicly endorsed Annegret Kramp-Karrenbauer to succeed Angela Merkel as the party's chair. He later endorsed Norbert Röttgen as Kramp-Karrenbauer's successor at the party’s 2021 leadership election.

In September 2020, Kiesewetter was one of 15 members of his parliamentary group who joined Röttgen in writing an open letter to Minister of the Interior Horst Seehofer which called on Germany and other EU counties to take in 5000 immigrants who were left without shelter after fires gutted the overcrowded Mória Reception and Identification Centre on the Greek island of Lesbos.

Ahead of the 2021 national elections, Kiesewetter endorsed Armin Laschet as the Christian Democrats' joint candidate to succeed Chancellor Angela Merkel.

In January 2025, Kiesewetter was one of 12 CDU lawmakers who opted not to back a draft law on tightening immigration policy sponsored by their own leader Friedrich Merz, who had pushed for the law despite warnings from party colleagues that he risked being tarnished with the charge of voting alongside the far-right Alternative for Germany.

=== Defence policy ===
In 2012, Kiesewetter and Andreas Schockenhoff proposed in a strategy paper a reform of the requirement of parliamentary approval when sending Bundeswehr soldiers abroad, suggesting instead to introduce a yearly, general parliamentary decision on German participation in integrated military structures, such as AWACS, EU Battlegroups and the NATO Response Force (NRF). The government would then have a right to deploy, while the Bundestag would have the right to recall the troops.

=== NSA surveillance scandal ===
In 2014, Kiesewetter said efforts to lock in a "no-spy" agreement with the U.S. contradict the need to follow threatening developments in friendly states. Later that year, he called on Edward Snowden to speak with the German parliament's investigative committee on NSA surveillance activities in Germany.

=== Relations with Russia ===
In August 2012, Kiesewetter was one of 124 members of the Bundestag to sign a letter that was sent to the Russian ambassador to Germany, Vladimir Grinin, expressing concern over the trial against the three members of Pussy riot. "Being held in detention for months and the threat of lengthy punishment are draconian and disproportionate," the lawmakers said in the letter. "In a secular and pluralist state, peaceful artistic acts – even if they can be seen as provocative – must not lead to the accusation of serious criminal acts that lead to lengthy prison terms."

Holding a special interest in the Balkans, Kiesewetter has in the past called for a stronger German and European commitment to the region, arguing that "Russia is coming into the region as a competitor." He also argues that Berlin should respond to positive changes in the region, such as the election of Klaus Johannis, the reform-minded Romanian president, who "deserves support".

In a 2014 article in Vanity Fair, Kiesewetter is quoted on the Russian military intervention in Ukraine: "We think he has a hidden strategy to disturb and weaken the E.U. to cause it to split." On a United Kingdom withdrawal from the European Union, he later argued "it would be a success for Russia" and that "it cannot be in Germany's national interest for a British exit to weaken the EU and strengthen Germany."

Days after the 2022 Nord Stream pipeline sabotage Kiesewetter argued that Russia was behind the attack. In July and August 2023 he explicitly accused Russia of having perpetrated the attack.

=== Relations with Israel ===
When Der Spiegel uncovered the German government's controversial decision to export up to 270 Leopard 2A7+ tanks to Saudi Arabia in October 2011, Kiesewetter in a parliamentary debate put forward a version of events presenting Israel as the driving force behind the decision, claiming that "Israel not only wanted the sale of these tanks, but explicitly supported it."

When Israeli Foreign Minister Avigdor Lieberman called on Germany to lead a control mission for the Rafah checkpoint between the Gaza Strip and Egypt in 2014, Kiesewetter cautioned that "having German soldiers on the ground is not an option because that would be unacceptable for Israel."

== Other activities ==
- German Military Reserve Association, president (2011–2016)
- Trilateral Commission, Member of the European Group (since 2022)
- Southeast Europe Association (SOG), vice-president
- Advisory Board for Civilian Crisis Prevention, member
- EastWest Institute, Member of the Parliamentarians Network for Conflict Prevention
- Federal Academy for Security Policy (BAKS), member of the advisory board
- Center for International Peace Operations (ZIF), member of the supervisory board
- European Council on Foreign Relations (ECFR), member
- European Leadership Network (ELN), member
- German-Mozambican Society, Member of the Advisory Board
- European Security Round Table, member of the advisory board (2009–2013)
- German-British Society, member
- Parliamentarians Network for Conflict Prevention of the EastWest Institute, member
- Lions Club, member

== Awards ==
- 1997: General Heusinger Prize
- 2023: Honorary Senator of Aalen University
- In January 2026, the Ukraine government awarded him the Recipients of the Order of Merit, 3rd class

Other offices
Preceded by Gerd Höfer	President of the Reservist Association of Deutsche Bundeswehr; 2011–2016	Succeeded by Oswin Veith
