= Essingen (Württemberg) =

- Municipality
- Coat of arms

- Location of Essingen within Ostalbkreis district
- Interactive map of Essingen
- Location within Germany Location within Baden-Württemberg
- Coordinates: 48°48′30″N 10°01′40″E
- Country: Germany
- State: Baden-Württemberg
- Admin. region: Stuttgart
- District: Ostalbkreis
- Subdivisions: 7 Teilorte

Government
  - Mayor (2021–29): Wolfgang Hofer (CDU)

Area
  - Total: 58.49 km^{2} (22.58 sq mi)
- Elevation: 508 m (1,667 ft)

Population (2025-12-31)
  - Total: 6,421
  - Density: 109.8/km^{2} (284.3/sq mi)
- Time zone: UTC+01:00 (CET)
  - Summer (DST): UTC+02:00 (CEST)
- Postal codes: 73457
- Dialling codes: 07365
- Vehicle registration: AA, GD
- Website: www.essingen.de

Essingen (German pronunciation: [ˈɛsɪŋən]) is a municipality in the Ostalbkreis in the State of Baden-Württemberg in Germany. It lies about 73 km east of Stuttgart, just outside the city of Aalen. The Rems river begins just outside Essingen, on its way down the Remstal (Rems Valley) to merge with the Neckar near Stuttgart.

Essingen currently has about 6500 residents, and is located on the northern end of the Swabian Alb. It is mainly a dormitory community, but does have industry along the B29 federal road and Stuttgart-Aalen railway.

Recreational activities include biking, hiking, and rambling. In the winter, there are opportunities for skiing.

In the middle of the village lies the Schloss (castle) and Schloss Park. The castle was built circa 1550 by the Woellwarth Family. It has remained in the family until recently when it was sold at auction causing much controversy in the village. Some villagers wanted to save the castle to be used for various activities and events but the consensus was that the castle would be too expensive to maintain and run.

Essingen is a larger municipality, and the nearby villages of Lauterburg, Forst, Dauerwang, Hermannsfeld, Birkenteich and Hohenroden belong to Essingen.

== Mayor ==
Wolfgang Hofer (* 1963) was elected mayor in 1997, he was reelected in 2005, 2013 and 2021.

== Local council ==
Elections in June 2024:

- Free voters: 9 seats
- CDU/Free citizens Essingen: 8 seats
- SPD: 3 seats
- The Greens: 4 seats

== Notable people ==
- Marie Daiber (1868–1928), Swiss zoologist born in Essingen
