= Rosenberg (Ostalb) =

- Municipality
- Coat of arms

- Location of Rosenberg within Ostalbkreis district
- Interactive map of Rosenberg
- Location within Germany Location within Baden-Württemberg
- Coordinates: 49°01′08″N 10°01′53″E
- Country: Germany
- State: Baden-Württemberg
- Admin. region: Stuttgart
- District: Ostalbkreis

Government
  - Mayor (2018–26): Tobias Schneider

Area
  - Total: 41.02 km^{2} (15.84 sq mi)
- Elevation: 492 m (1,614 ft)

Population (2025-12-31)
  - Total: 2,585
  - Density: 63.02/km^{2} (163.2/sq mi)
- Time zone: UTC+01:00 (CET)
  - Summer (DST): UTC+02:00 (CEST)
- Postal codes: 73494
- Dialling codes: 07967
- Vehicle registration: AA
- Website: www.gemeinde-rosenberg.de

Rosenberg (German pronunciation: [ˈʁoːzn̩bɛʁk]) is a municipality in the district of Ostalbkreis in Baden-Württemberg in Germany.
