= Neuler =

- Municipality
- Coat of arms

- Location of Neuler within Ostalbkreis district
- Interactive map of Neuler
- Location within Germany Location within Baden-Württemberg
- Coordinates: 48°55′43″N 10°04′10″E
- Country: Germany
- State: Baden-Württemberg
- Admin. region: Stuttgart
- District: Ostalbkreis

Government
  - Mayor (2017–25): Sabine Heidrich

Area
  - Total: 36.27 km^{2} (14.00 sq mi)
- Elevation: 518 m (1,699 ft)

Population (2025-12-31)
  - Total: 3,281
  - Density: 90.46/km^{2} (234.3/sq mi)
- Time zone: UTC+01:00 (CET)
  - Summer (DST): UTC+02:00 (CEST)
- Postal codes: 73491
- Dialling codes: 07961
- Vehicle registration: AA
- Website: www.neuler.de

Neuler (German pronunciation: [ˈnɔʏlɐ]) is a municipality in the German state of Baden-Württemberg, in Ostalbkreis district.

== Geography ==
=== Geographical location ===
Neuler lies on a ridge between the Kocher and Jagst rivers, about seven kilometers southwest of Ellwangen. It has a share in the natural regions of the Eastern Swabian Foothills and the Swabian-Franconian Forest Mountains, both of which belong to the Swabian Keuper-Lias Lands.

=== Neighboring municipalities ===
The municipality borders Rosenberg to the north, the town of Ellwangen to the northeast, Rainau to the east, Hüttlingen to the south, Abtsgmünd to the southwest, and Adelmannsfelden to the west.

=== Municipal division ===
The municipality of Neuler includes the village of Neuler, the hamlets of Bronnen, Ebnat, Gaishardt, Leinenfirst, Ramsenstrut and Schwenningen, the court Haldenhof, and the houses Adlersteige, Binderhof, Burghardsmühle, Burgstall, Himmelreich, Kohlwasen, Pfaffenhölzle and Schönberger Hof, as well as the deserted villages of Burgstall, Gern, Oberbrandhof, Schlierhof, Schliermühle, Schöffelhöfe and Schönenberg.

== History ==
=== Local history ===
Neuler was first documented in 1113. In 1746, the baroque parish church was built on the foundations of a Gothic church. The town originally belonged to the Prince-Provostry of Ellwangen. With secularization resulting from the Principal Conclusion of the Imperial Deputation in 1803, the Prince-Provostry, including Neuler, fell to the Electorate of Württemberg, which became the Kingdom of Württemberg in 1806. In accordance with the new administrative division, Neuler was assigned to the Oberamt of Ellwangen. As part of the district reform during the Nazi era in Württemberg, Neuler came under the Aalen district in 1938. After World War II, Neuler belonged to the postwar state of Württemberg-Baden, founded in 1945 in the American occupation zone, from 1945 to 1952. In 1952, the municipality became part of the new state of Baden-Württemberg. In the postwar years, the formerly agriculturally characterized town developed into a workers' residential community. Through the district reform of 1973, Neuler became part of the newly created Ostalbkreis district.

=== Incorporations ===
On 1 January 1977, the area of the village of Schwenningen, which had belonged to the neighboring municipality of Rainau, was incorporated.

=== Population development ===
The population figures from 1852 to 1970 are census results and from 1980 onwards official updates from the Statistical State Office.

Year	Population
1852	1499
1871	1494
1880	1510
1890	1479
1900	1406
1910	1479
1925	1559
1933	1514
1939	1413

Year	Population
1950	1967
1956	1780
1961	1790
1970	2020
1980	2449
1990	2696
2000	3038
2010	3164
2015	3166

== Religions ==
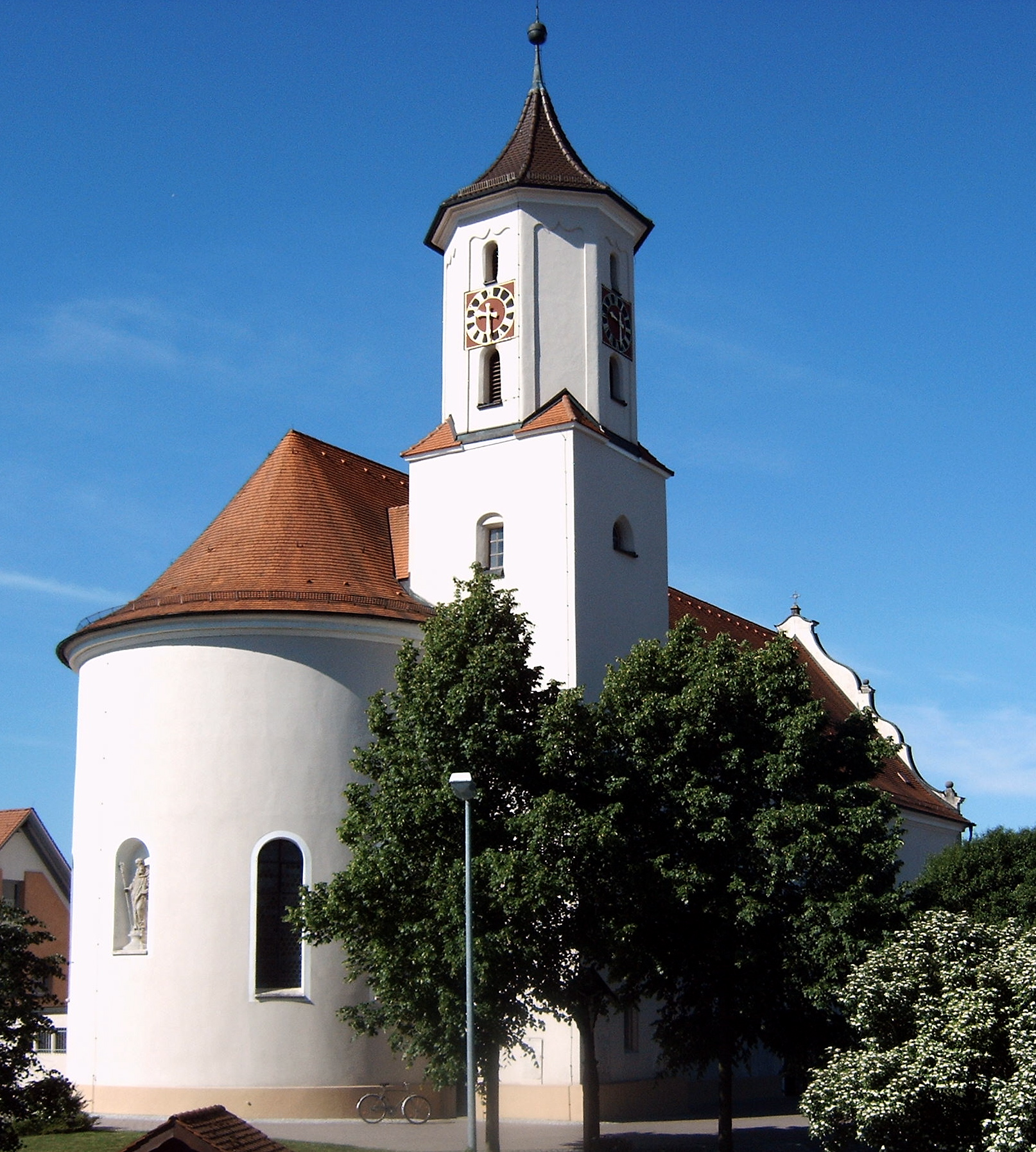
Catholic Parish Church of St. Benedict

Even after the introduction of the Reformation in other parts of Germany, Neuler remained predominantly Catholic. Today the majority of residents are affiliated with the Roman Catholic Church of St. Benedict. The few Protestants belong to the parish of Ellwangen.

== Politics ==
The municipality is a member of the Joint Administrative Association of the city of Ellwangen (Jagst).

=== Mayor ===
In December 1985, Manfred Fischer was first elected as mayor and re-elected in 1993, 2001, and 2009.

In November 2017, Sabine Heidrich was elected as mayor.

== Culture and sightseeing ==
=== Sports ===
The most well-known sports club in Neuler is the Turnverein Neuler (gymnastics club).

=== Regular events ===
Neuler is known for its carnival parade. Every year on Carnival Sunday, up to 25,000 people line the streets to watch the carnival parade with its many themed floats and marching groups.

== Economy and infrastructure ==
=== Education ===
The Brühlschule is a primary school. Secondary schools are located in Ellwangen. Additionally, there are two Roman Catholic kindergartens in the area.
