= Margit Stumpp =

German politician (Alliance 90/The Greens)

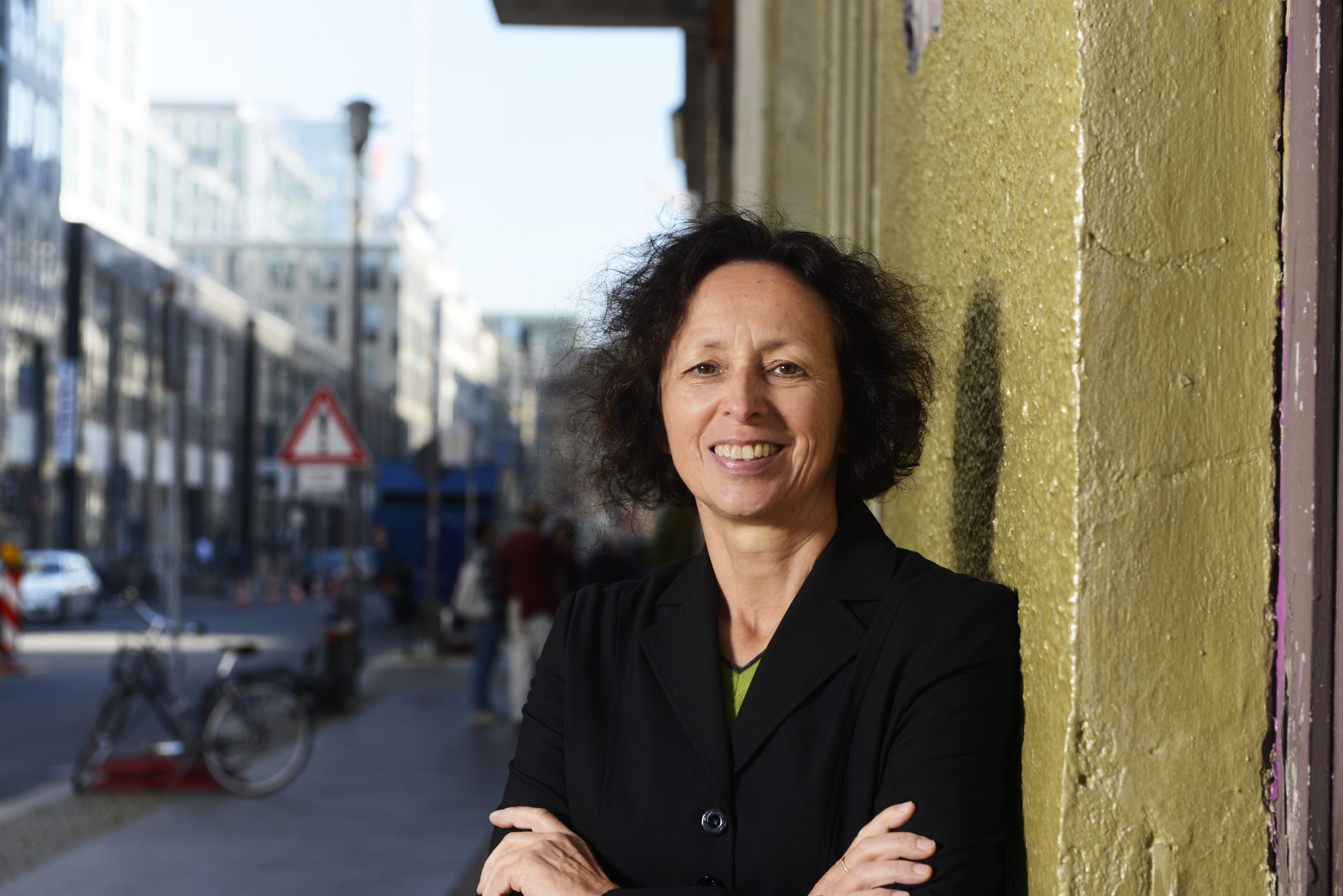
- Margit Stumpp in 2019

Member of the Bundestag
- Incumbent
- Assumed office 2017

Personal details
- Born: 13 April 1963 (age 62); Mengen, West Germany
- Political party: Greens
- Children: 2

Margit Stumpp (born 13 April 1963) is a German politician of Alliance 90/The Greens. She has been a member of the Bundestag, the German parliament from 2017 to 2021.

== Early life and career ==
Stumpp was born in Mengen. After an apprenticeship in home economics, she studied precision engineering and worked as an engineer and as a teacher.

== Political career ==
Stumpp is a member of the Europa-Union Deutschland.

Since 2009 Stumpp is member of Alliance 90/The Greens and got elected 2013 to the party's Baden-Württemberg association board. 2013 Stumpp ran unsuccessfully for the federal parliament in 2013, but in 2017 she was elected. In 2021 she got a lower place on the list of her party and missed entering the Bundestag again.

In 2021 an investigation by the digital-policy site netzpolitik.org showed that the article of the German Wikipedia site about her was 72 percent written by herself.

== Other activities ==
- Stumpp is member of German Cyclist's Association (ADFC), German Youth Hostel Association (DJH), Greenpeace, Nature and Biodiversity Conservation Union (NABU), and since 2018 Alternate Member of the Board of Trustees Federal Agency for Civic Education (BPB).

== Personal life ==
Stumpp is married and has two children.
