= Lauchheim =

- Town
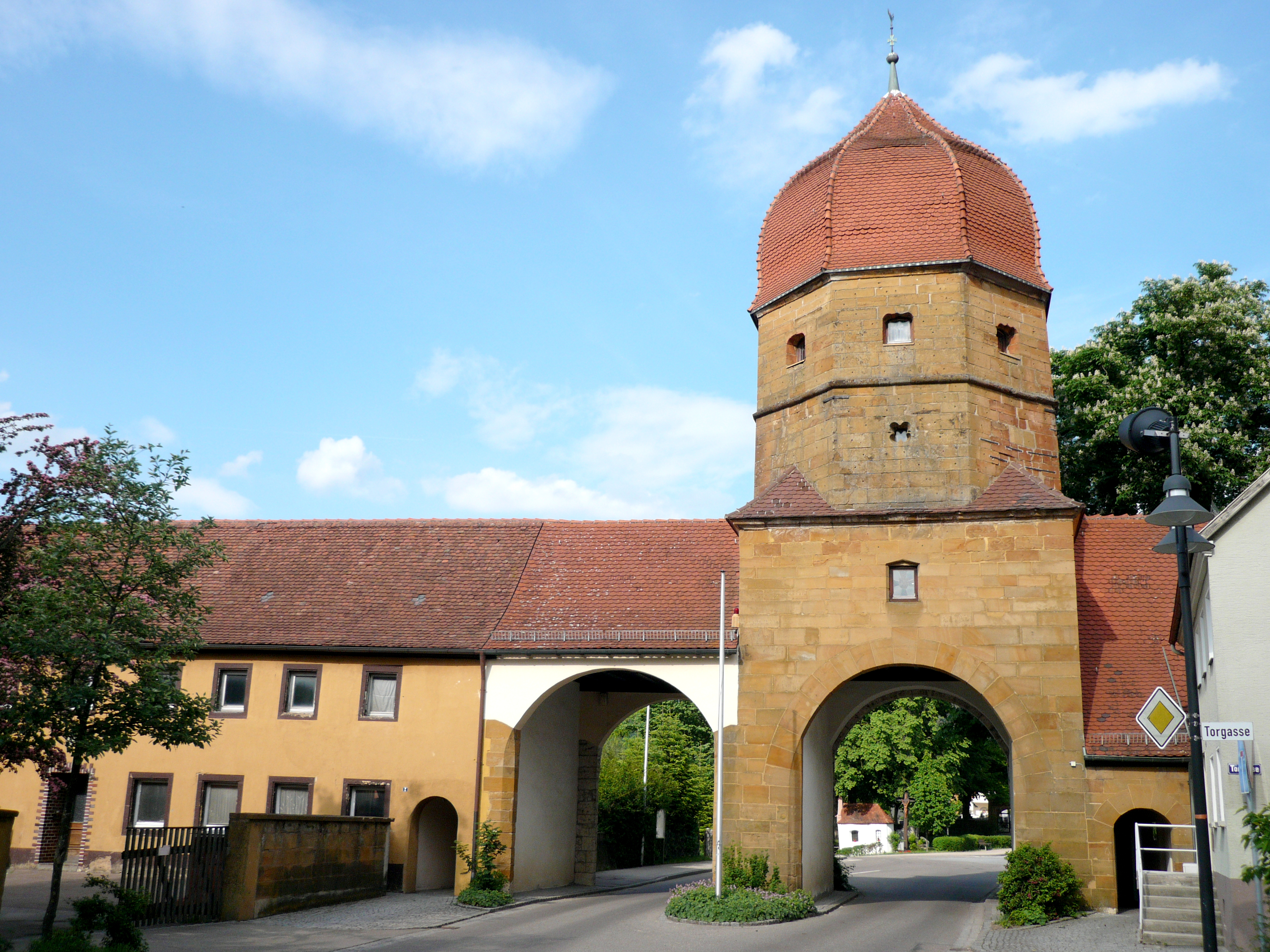
- Upper Gate

- Flag Coat of arms

- Location of Lauchheim within Ostalbkreis district
- Interactive map of Lauchheim
- Location within Germany Location within Baden-Württemberg
- Coordinates: 48°52′18″N 10°14′40″E
- Country: Germany
- State: Baden-Württemberg
- Admin. region: Stuttgart
- District: Ostalbkreis

Government
  - Mayor (2023–31): Andrea Schnele (Ind.)

Area
  - Total: 40.86 km^{2} (15.78 sq mi)
- Elevation: 492 m (1,614 ft)

Population (2025-12-31)
  - Total: 4,975
  - Density: 121.8/km^{2} (315.3/sq mi)
- Time zone: UTC+01:00 (CET)
  - Summer (DST): UTC+02:00 (CEST)
- Postal codes: 73466
- Dialling codes: 07363
- Vehicle registration: AA, GD
- Website: www.lauchheim.de

Lauchheim (German pronunciation: [ˈlaʊxˌhaɪm]) is a town and municipality with approximately 4800 inhabitants in the Ostalbkreis district, in the Stuttgart region of Baden-Württemberg, Germany.

== Geography ==
Lauchheim is situated on the river Jagst, 12 km northeast of Aalen. It neighbors Westhausen to the north and west, Bopfingen to the east, and Aalen to the south as municipalities. Schloss Kapfenburg, a castle, is located within Lauchheim’s municipality.

=== Suburbs ===
Largest suburbs of Lauchheim are Röttingen and Hülen, with smaller ones being Gromberg, Hettelsberg, Stetten, and the depared villages of Tatenloch, Königsbühl, Neusselbuch, Niederhofen, and Mittelhofen.
