= Jagstzell =

- Municipality
- Coat of arms

- Location of Jagstzell within Ostalbkreis district
- Interactive map of Jagstzell
- Location within Germany Location within Baden-Württemberg
- Coordinates: 49°01′51″N 10°05′36″E
- Country: Germany
- State: Baden-Württemberg
- Admin. region: Stuttgart
- District: Ostalbkreis

Government
  - Mayor (2021–29): Patrick Michael Peukert

Area
  - Total: 37.95 km^{2} (14.65 sq mi)
- Elevation: 424 m (1,391 ft)

Population (2025-12-31)
  - Total: 2,339
  - Density: 61.63/km^{2} (159.6/sq mi)
- Time zone: UTC+01:00 (CET)
  - Summer (DST): UTC+02:00 (CEST)
- Postal codes: 73489
- Dialling codes: 07967
- Vehicle registration: AA
- Website: www.jagstzell-gemeinde.de

Jagstzell (German pronunciation: [jakstˈt͡sɛl]) is a municipality in the German state of Baden-Württemberg, in Ostalbkreis district.
