= Fremdingen =

- Municipality
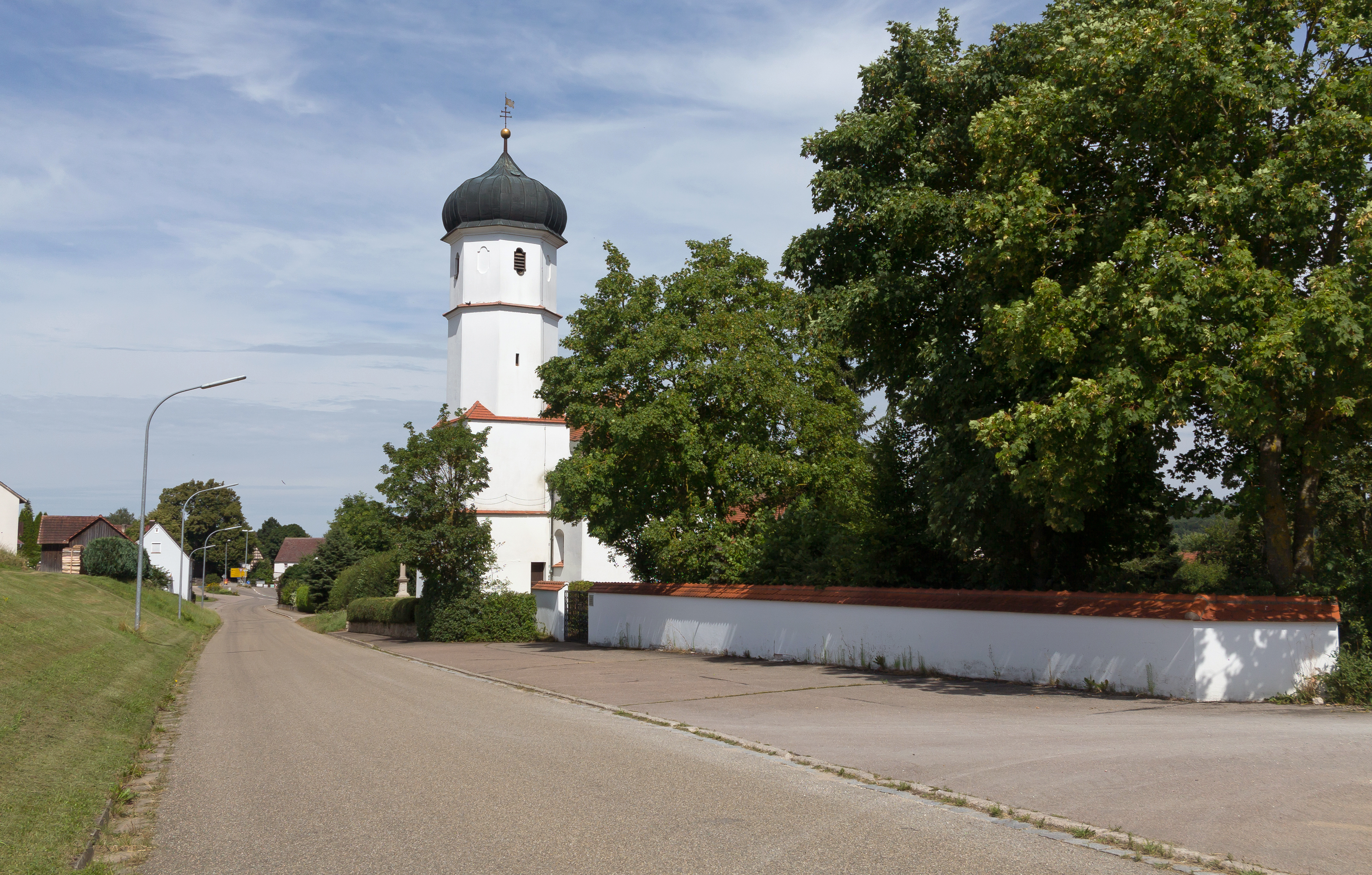
- Chapel of Saint Leonhard

- Coat of arms

- Location of Fremdingen within Donau-Ries district
- Interactive map of Fremdingen
- Location within Germany Location within Bavaria
- Coordinates: 48°58′N 10°28′E
- Country: Germany
- State: Bavaria
- Admin. region: Schwaben
- District: Donau-Ries

Government
  - Mayor (2020–26): Frank Merkt

Area
  - Total: 50.07 km^{2} (19.33 sq mi)
- Elevation: 457 m (1,499 ft)

Population (2025-12-31)
  - Total: 2,056
  - Density: 41.06/km^{2} (106.4/sq mi)
- Time zone: UTC+01:00 (CET)
  - Summer (DST): UTC+02:00 (CEST)
- Postal codes: 86742
- Dialling codes: 09086
- Vehicle registration: DON
- Website: www.fremdingen.de

Fremdingen is a municipality in the district of Donau-Ries in Bavaria in Germany.

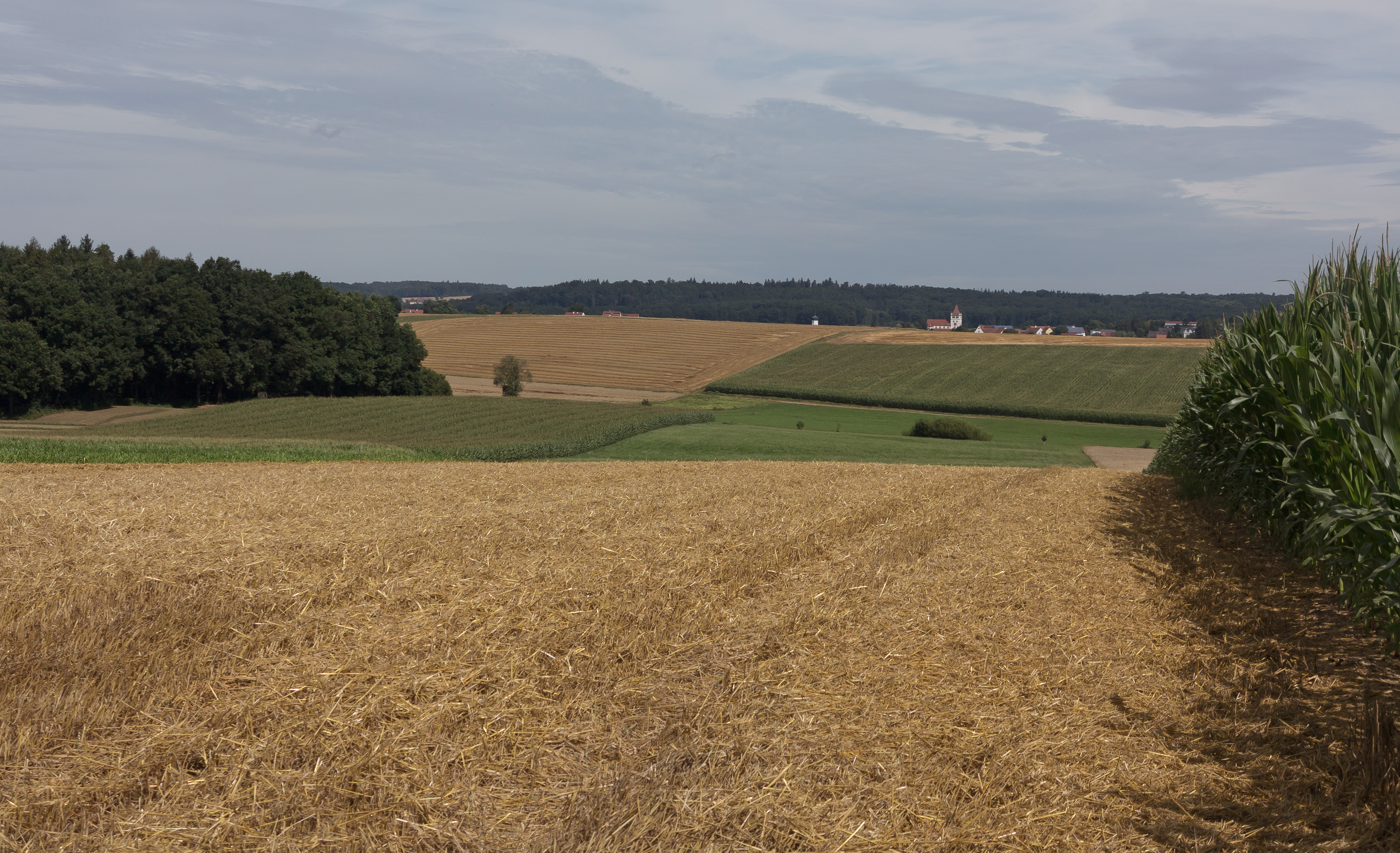
Panorama near Fremdingen
