= Neresheim =

- Town
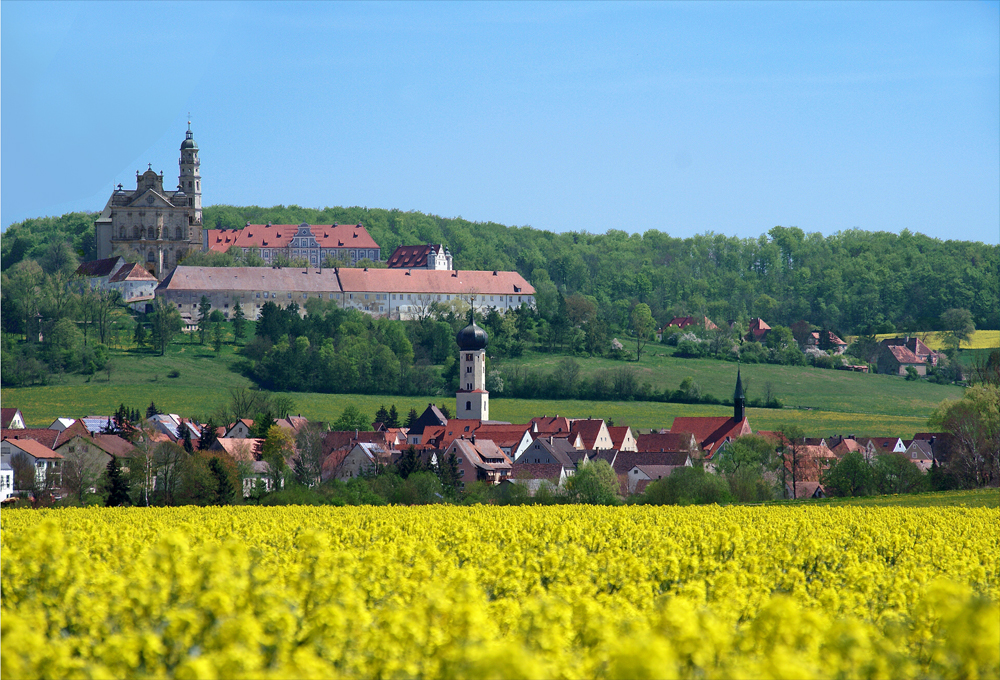
- Neresheim, abbey in background

- Coat of arms

- Location of Neresheim within Ostalbkreis district
- Interactive map of Neresheim
- Location within Germany Location within Baden-Württemberg
- Coordinates: 48°45′15″N 10°20′04″E
- Country: Germany
- State: Baden-Württemberg
- Admin. region: Stuttgart
- District: Ostalbkreis
- Subdivisions: 6 Stadtteile

Government
  - Mayor (2017–25): Thomas Häfele

Area
  - Total: 118.51 km^{2} (45.76 sq mi)
- Elevation: 503 m (1,650 ft)

Population (2025-12-31)
  - Total: 7,921
  - Density: 66.84/km^{2} (173.1/sq mi)
- Time zone: UTC+01:00 (CET)
  - Summer (DST): UTC+02:00 (CEST)
- Postal codes: 73450
- Dialling codes: 07326, Elchingen 07367
- Vehicle registration: AA
- Website: www.neresheim.de

Neresheim (German pronunciation: [ˈneːʁəshaɪm]) is a town in the Ostalbkreis district, in Baden-Württemberg, Germany. It is situated 16 kilometres (9.9 mi) northeast of Heidenheim, and 20 kilometres (12 mi) southeast of Aalen. It's the home of the Neresheim Abbey, which still hosts monks, was Reichsfrei until the German Mediatisation and was built by Balthasar Neumann. Another notable touristic attraction is the heritage railway Härtsfeldbahn.

Neresheim is listed on the Arc de Triomphe in Paris, France, along with 95 other sites of battles won by the French army.

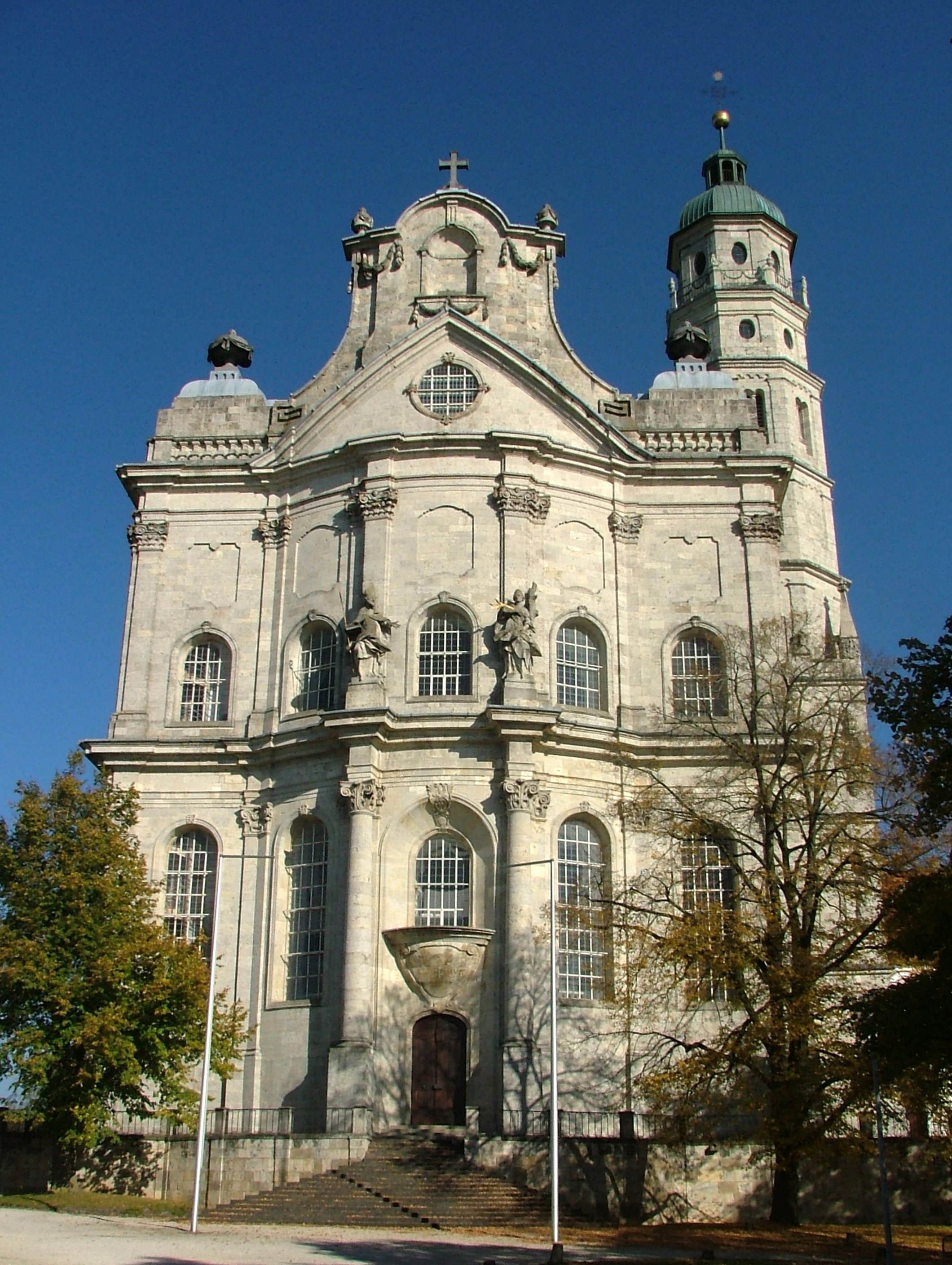
Neresheim Abbey

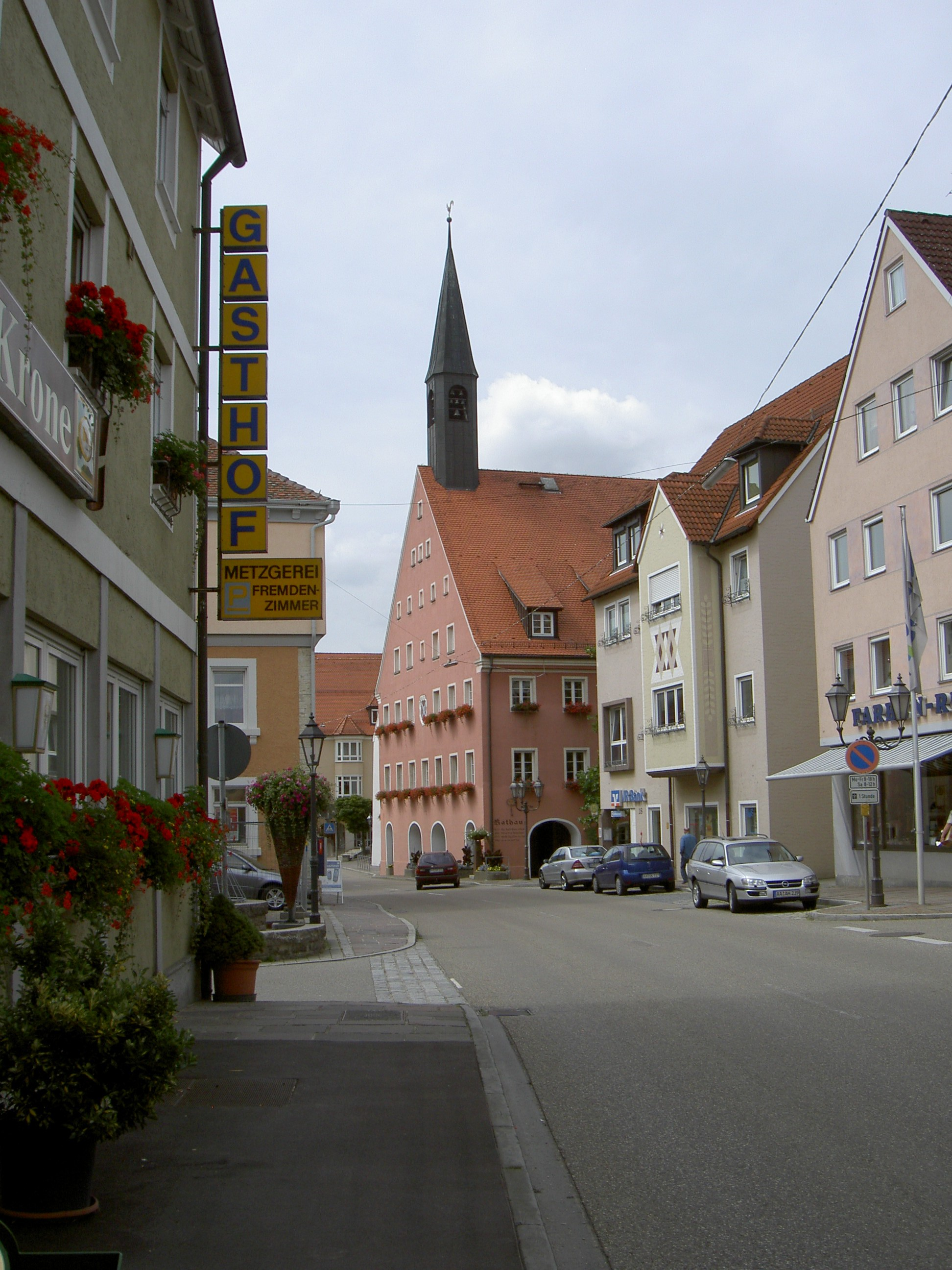
Neresheim Town hall (Red building with tower)

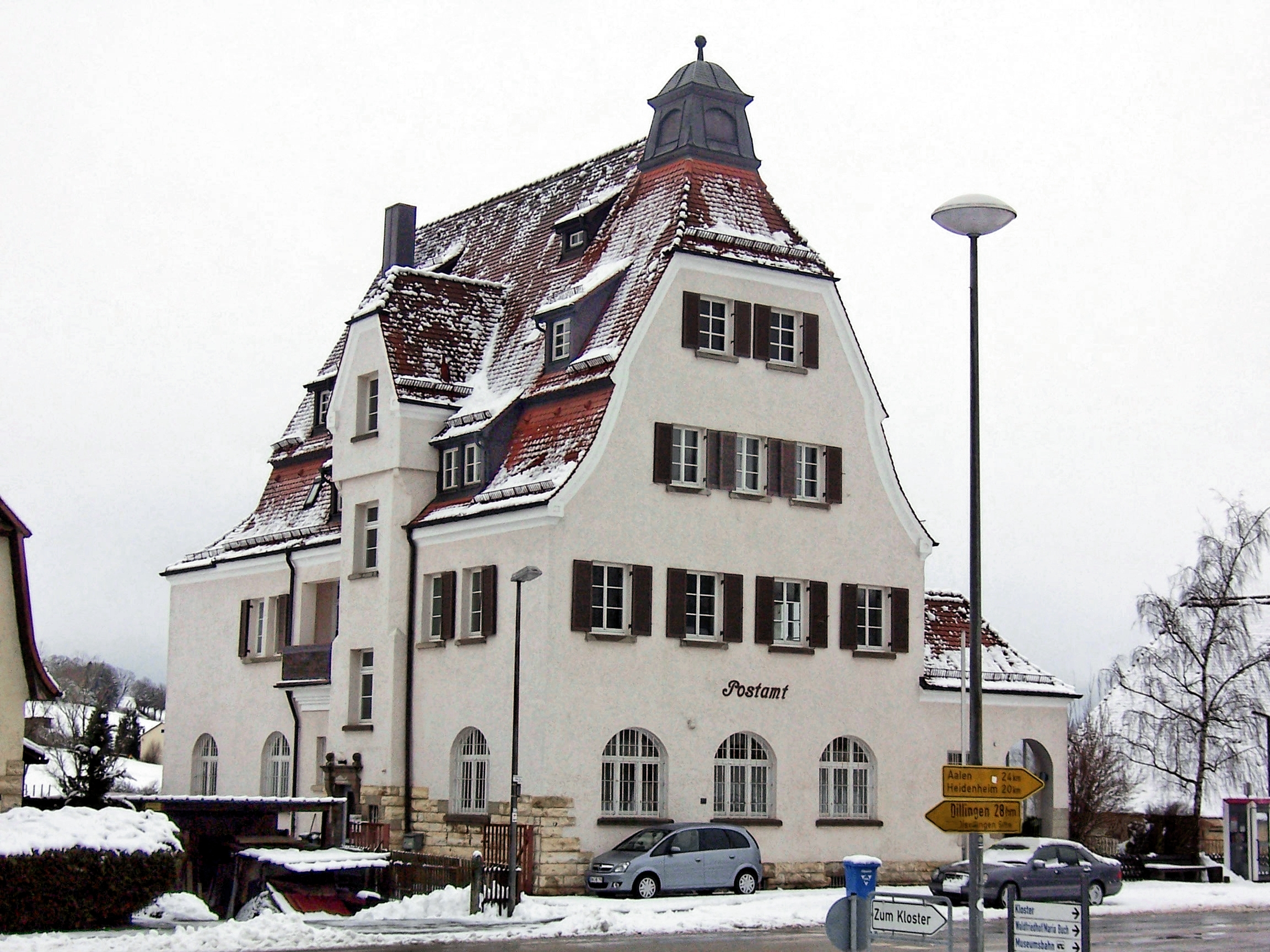
Former post-office Neresheim

== Notable people ==
- Oscar F. Mayer (1859–1955), founded the American meat production company Oscar Mayer.
- Karl Bonhoeffer (1868–1948), psychiatrist and neurologist, father of theologian Dietrich Bonhoeffer
- twins Andreas Zeyer & Michael Zeyer (born 1968), retired footballers, played 474 & 487 games
