= Riesbürg =

- Municipality
- Coat of arms

- Location of Riesbürg within Ostalbkreis district
- Interactive map of Riesbürg
- Location within Germany Location within Baden-Württemberg
- Coordinates: 48°51′02″N 10°26′02″E
- Country: Germany
- State: Baden-Württemberg
- Admin. region: Stuttgart
- District: Ostalbkreis

Government
  - Mayor (2019–27): Willibald Freihart

Area
  - Total: 17.97 km^{2} (6.94 sq mi)
- Elevation: 445 m (1,460 ft)

Population (2025-12-31)
  - Total: 2,190
  - Density: 122/km^{2} (316/sq mi)
- Time zone: UTC+01:00 (CET)
  - Summer (DST): UTC+02:00 (CEST)
- Postal codes: 73469
- Dialling codes: 09081
- Vehicle registration: AA
- Website: www.riesbuerg.de

Riesbürg (German pronunciation: [ˈʁiːsbʏʁk]) is a municipality in the district of Ostalbkreis in Baden-Württemberg in Germany.

The city has a beautifully restored 1847 synagogue.
