= Rainau =

- Municipality
- Coat of arms

- Location of Rainau within Ostalbkreis district
- Interactive map of Rainau
- Location within Germany Location within Baden-Württemberg
- Coordinates: 48°55′39″N 10°08′19″E
- Country: Germany
- State: Baden-Württemberg
- Admin. region: Stuttgart
- District: Ostalbkreis

Government
  - Mayor (2021–29): Christoph Konle

Area
  - Total: 25.47 km^{2} (9.83 sq mi)
- Elevation: 462 m (1,516 ft)

Population (2025-12-31)
  - Total: 3,332
  - Density: 130.8/km^{2} (338.8/sq mi)
- Time zone: UTC+01:00 (CET)
  - Summer (DST): UTC+02:00 (CEST)
- Postal codes: 73492
- Dialling codes: 07961
- Vehicle registration: AA
- Website: www.rainau.de

Rainau (German pronunciation: [ˈʁaɪnaʊ]) is a municipality in the German state of Baden-Württemberg, in Ostalbkreis district.
