= Ellenberg, Baden-Württemberg =

Ellenberg
- Municipality
- Coat of arms

- Location of Ellenberg within Ostalbkreis district
- Interactive map of Ellenberg
- Location within Germany Location within Baden-Württemberg
- Coordinates: 49°00′55″N 10°13′01″E
- Country: Germany
- State: Baden-Württemberg
- Admin. region: Stuttgart
- District: Ostalbkreis

Government
  - Mayor (2022–30): Anna-Lisa Bohn (Ind.)

Area
  - Total: 30.19 km^{2} (11.66 sq mi)
- Elevation: 574 m (1,883 ft)

Population (2025-12-31)
  - Total: 1,819
  - Density: 60.25/km^{2} (156.1/sq mi)
- Time zone: UTC+01:00 (CET)
  - Summer (DST): UTC+02:00 (CEST)
- Postal codes: 73488
- Dialling codes: 07962, 07961, 07965, 07966
- Vehicle registration: AA
- Website: www.ellenberg.de

Ellenberg (German pronunciation: [ˈɛlənbɛʁk]) is a municipality in the German state of Baden-Württemberg, in Ostalbkreis district.

== Mayor ==
Anna-Lisa Bohn was elected mayor in 2022. Her predecessor was Rainer Knecht, in office from 1993.
