= Westhausen (Ostalb) =

- Municipality
- Flag Coat of arms

- Location of Westhausen within Ostalbkreis district
- Interactive map of Westhausen
- Location within Germany Location within Baden-Württemberg
- Coordinates: 48°53′02″N 10°11′11″E
- Country: Germany
- State: Baden-Württemberg
- Admin. region: Stuttgart
- District: Ostalbkreis

Government
  - Mayor (2017–25): Markus Knoblauch

Area
  - Total: 38.45 km^{2} (14.85 sq mi)
- Elevation: 474 m (1,555 ft)

Population (2025-12-31)
  - Total: 6,131
  - Density: 159.5/km^{2} (413.0/sq mi)
- Time zone: UTC+01:00 (CET)
  - Summer (DST): UTC+02:00 (CEST)
- Postal codes: 73463
- Dialling codes: 07363
- Vehicle registration: AA
- Website: www.westhausen.de

Westhausen (German pronunciation: [vɛstˈhaʊzn̩]) is a municipality in the district of Ostalbkreis in Baden-Württemberg (Germany).
