= Stödtlen =

- Municipality
- Coat of arms

- Location of Stödtlen within Ostalbkreis district
- Interactive map of Stödtlen
- Location within Germany Location within Baden-Württemberg
- Coordinates: 49°00′05″N 10°17′57″E
- Country: Germany
- State: Baden-Württemberg
- Admin. region: Stuttgart
- District: Ostalbkreis

Government
  - Mayor (2023–31): Jan-Erik Bauer

Area
  - Total: 31.18 km^{2} (12.04 sq mi)
- Elevation: 489 m (1,604 ft)

Population (2025-12-31)
  - Total: 1,783
  - Density: 57.18/km^{2} (148.1/sq mi)
- Time zone: UTC+01:00 (CET)
  - Summer (DST): UTC+02:00 (CEST)
- Postal codes: 73495
- Dialling codes: 07964
- Vehicle registration: AA
- Website: www.stoedtlen.de

Stödtlen (German pronunciation: [ˈʃtøːtlən]) is a municipality in Baden-Württemberg, Germany, located in the Ostalbkreis district. It has about 2000 inhabitants.

== Mayors ==
- 1898–1927 Benedikt Staiger (father)
- 1927–1974 Benedikt Staiger (son)
- 1974–1998 Albert Munz
- 1998–2023 Ralf Leinberger
- since 2023 Jan-Erik Bauer
