= Kirchheim am Ries =

- Municipality
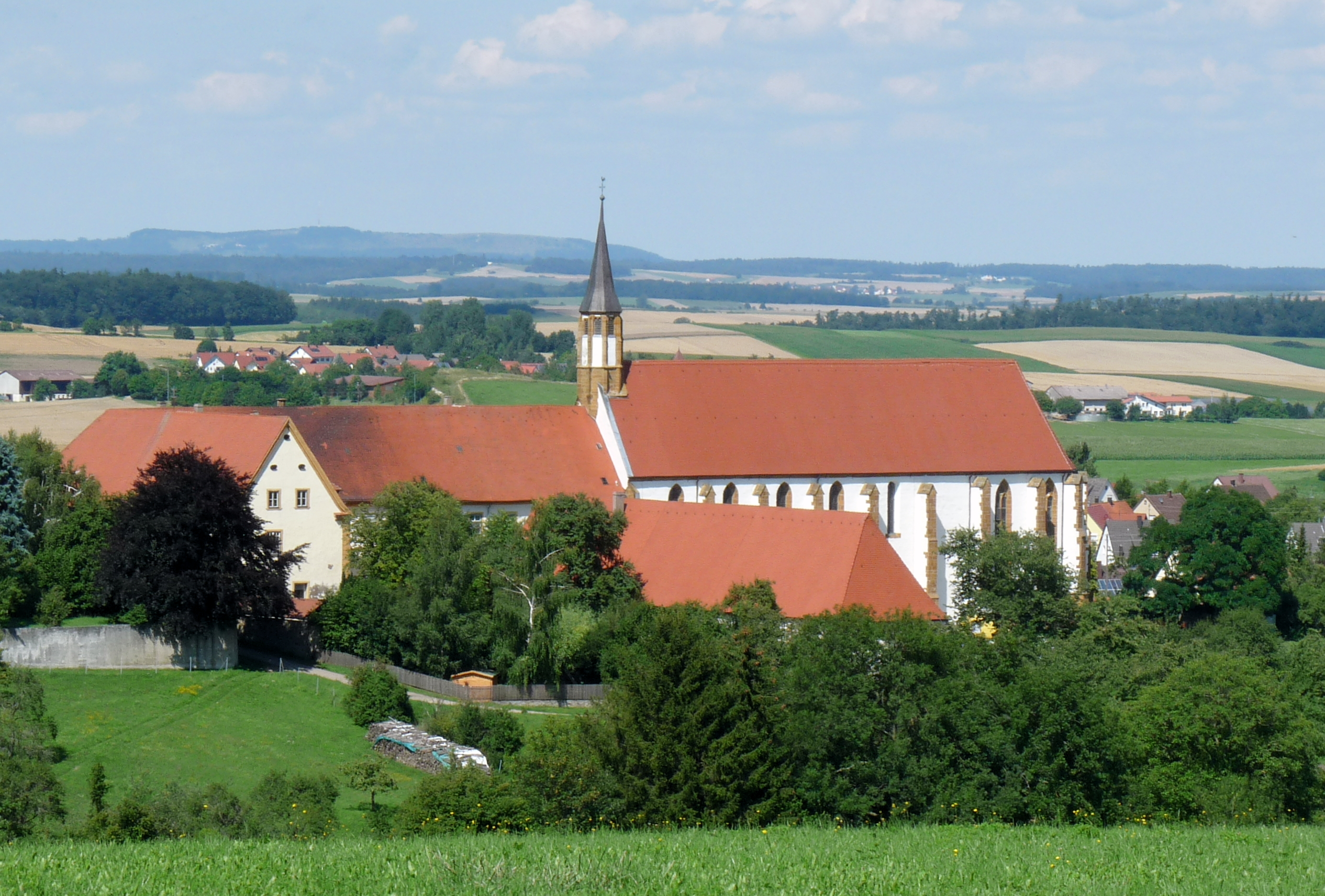
- Former Cistercian monastery

- Coat of arms

- Location of Kirchheim am Ries within Ostalbkreis district
- Interactive map of Kirchheim am Ries
- Location within Germany Location within Baden-Württemberg
- Coordinates: 48°52′43″N 10°24′02″E
- Country: Germany
- State: Baden-Württemberg
- Admin. region: Stuttgart
- District: Ostalbkreis

Government
  - Mayor (2021–29): Danyel Atalay

Area
  - Total: 21.05 km^{2} (8.13 sq mi)
- Elevation: 485 m (1,591 ft)

Population (2025-12-31)
  - Total: 1,716
  - Density: 81.52/km^{2} (211.1/sq mi)
- Time zone: UTC+01:00 (CET)
  - Summer (DST): UTC+02:00 (CEST)
- Postal codes: 73467
- Dialling codes: 07362
- Vehicle registration: AA
- Website: www.kirchheim-am-ries.de

Kirchheim (German pronunciation: [ˈkɪʁçhaɪm ʔam ˈʁiːs], lit. 'Kirchheim at the Ries') is a municipality in the district of Ostalbkreis in Baden-Württemberg in Germany.

== Demographics ==
Population development:

Year	Inhabitants
1990	1,815
2001	2,067
2011	1,889
2021	1,787

== Twin towns — sister cities ==
Kirchheim am Ries is twinned with:

- Solarolo, Italy
