= Ostalbkreis =

Coordinates: 48°52′N 10°06′E

- District
- Flag Coat of arms
- Country: Germany
- State: Baden-Württemberg
- Adm. region: Stuttgart
- Capital: Aalen

Government
  - District admin.: Joachim Bläse (CDU)

Area
  - Total: 1,511.5 km^{2} (583.6 sq mi)

Population (31 December 2023)
  - Total: 317,263
  - Density: 209.90/km^{2} (543.64/sq mi)
- Time zone: UTC+01:00 (CET)
  - Summer (DST): UTC+02:00 (CEST)
- Vehicle registration: AA, GD
- Website: http://www.ostalbkreis.de

The Ostalbkreis (German pronunciation: [ˈɔstʔalpˌkʁaɪs]) is a Landkreis (district) in the east of Baden-Württemberg, Germany, on the border to Bavaria. Neighboring districts are (from the north clockwise) Schwäbisch Hall, Ansbach, Donau-Ries, Heidenheim, Göppingen and Rems-Murr.

== History ==
The district was created in 1973, when the District of Aalen merged with most of the former District of Schwäbisch Gmünd.

== Geography ==
The district is located in the eastern part of the Swabian Alb (Schwäbische Alb), hence its name which translates to Eastern Alb District. Main rivers in the district are the Rems, the Jagst and the Kocher, all affluents of the Neckar.

== Politics ==
Federally, the district is part of two electoral ridings: 270 (Backnang – Schwäbisch Gmünd) and 271 (Aalen – Heidenheim). For the 2009 Election, the numeral designation was changed to 269 and 270 respectively. Both ridings are held by the CDU: Norbert Barthle (Backnang – Schwäbisch Gmünd) and Roderich Kiesewetter (Aalen - Heidenheim).

At the State level, the district also is part of two electoral ridings: 25 (Schwäbisch Gmünd) and 26 (Aalen). The last election was held on March 26, 2006 and both ridings were won by the CDU: Dr. Stefan Scheffold (Schwäbisch Gmünd) and Winfried Mack (Aalen).

The District election was held on June 7, 2009. Election results.

== Partnerships ==
Since 1992 the district has an official partnership with the Italian Province of Ravenna. Also since the 1990s it has a friendship with the Finnish Province of Oulu.

== Coat of arms ==
The imperial eagle to the right represents the free imperial cities in the district, especially the city of Aalen. The lion on the left is the symbol of the Staufen family, who founded the city of Schwäbisch Gmünd. These two symbols were taken from the coats of arms of the two precursor districts. The crosier in the middle represents Ellwangen Abbey, which possessed many smaller areas scattered in the district.

== Towns and communities ==
Clickable map of municipalities in the district

Towns	Communities
1. Aalen; 2. Bopfingen; 3. Ellwangen (Jagst); 4. Heubach; 5. Lauchheim; 6. Lorch (Württemberg); 7. Neresheim; 8. Oberkochen; 9. Schwäbisch Gmünd	1. Abtsgmünd; 2. Adelmannsfelden; 3. Bartholomä; 4. Böbingen (Rems); 5. Durlangen; 6. Ellenberg; 7. Eschach; 8. Essingen; 9. Göggingen; 10. Gschwend; 11. Heuchlingen; 12. Hüttlingen; 13. Iggingen; 14. Jagstzell; 15. Kirchheim am Ries; 16. Leinzell; 17. Mögglingen	18. Mutlangen; 19. Neuler; 20. Obergröningen; 21. Rainau; 22. Riesbürg; 23. Rosenberg (Ostalb); 24. Ruppertshofen; 25. Schechingen; 26. Spraitbach; 27. Stödtlen; 28. Täferrot; 29. Tannhausen; 30. Unterschneidheim; 31. Waldstetten; 32. Westhausen (Ostalb); 33. Wört
Administrative districts	1. Abtsgmünd; 2. Adelmannsfelden; 3. Bartholomä; 4. Böbingen (Rems); 5. Durlangen; 6. Ellenberg; 7. Eschach; 8. Essingen; 9. Göggingen; 10. Gschwend; 11. Heuchlingen; 12. Hüttlingen; 13. Iggingen; 14. Jagstzell; 15. Kirchheim am Ries; 16. Leinzell; 17. Mögglingen	18. Mutlangen; 19. Neuler; 20. Obergröningen; 21. Rainau; 22. Riesbürg; 23. Rosenberg (Ostalb); 24. Ruppertshofen; 25. Schechingen; 26. Spraitbach; 27. Stödtlen; 28. Täferrot; 29. Tannhausen; 30. Unterschneidheim; 31. Waldstetten; 32. Westhausen (Ostalb); 33. Wört
1. Aalen; 2. Bopfingen; 3. Ellwangen; 4. Kapfenburg; 5. Leintal-Frickenhofer Höhe; 6. Rosenstein; 7. Schwäbisch Gmünd; 8. Schwäbischer Wald; 9. Tannhausen	1. Abtsgmünd; 2. Adelmannsfelden; 3. Bartholomä; 4. Böbingen (Rems); 5. Durlangen; 6. Ellenberg; 7. Eschach; 8. Essingen; 9. Göggingen; 10. Gschwend; 11. Heuchlingen; 12. Hüttlingen; 13. Iggingen; 14. Jagstzell; 15. Kirchheim am Ries; 16. Leinzell; 17. Mögglingen	18. Mutlangen; 19. Neuler; 20. Obergröningen; 21. Rainau; 22. Riesbürg; 23. Rosenberg (Ostalb); 24. Ruppertshofen; 25. Schechingen; 26. Spraitbach; 27. Stödtlen; 28. Täferrot; 29. Tannhausen; 30. Unterschneidheim; 31. Waldstetten; 32. Westhausen (Ostalb); 33. Wört
