= Backnang – Schwäbisch Gmünd =

Federal electoral district of Germany

269 Backnang – Schwäbisch Gmünd
- Electoral district for the Bundestag
- Backnang – Schwäbisch Gmünd in 2025
- State: Baden-Württemberg
- Population: 246,200 (2019)
- Electorate: 177,062 (2021)
- Major settlements: Schwäbisch Gmünd; Backnang; Murrhardt
- Area: 838.7 km^{2}

Current electoral district
- Created: 1965
- Party: CDU
- Member: Ingeborg Gräßle
- Elected: 2021, 2025

Backnang – Schwäbisch Gmünd is an electoral constituency (German: Wahlkreis) represented in the Bundestag if it elects one member via first-past-the-post voting, which is not automatic anymore since 2023. Under the current constituency numbering system, it is designated as constituency 269. It is located in northeastern Baden-Württemberg, comprising the western part of the Ostalbkreis district and the northern part of the Rems-Murr-Kreis district.

Backnang – Schwäbisch Gmünd was created for the 1965 federal election. Since 2021, it has been represented by Ingeborg Gräßle of the Christian Democratic Union (CDU). In addition, 5th place Ricarda Lang was elected via her high rank on the state-wide party list of Alliance 90/The Greens, and in 2025, also Ruben Rupp (AfD).

== Geography ==
Backnang – Schwäbisch Gmünd is located in northeastern Baden-Württemberg. As of the 2021 federal election, it comprises the municipalities of Abtsgmünd, Bartholomä, Böbingen an der Rems, Durlangen, Eschach, Göggingen, Gschwend, Heubach, Heuchlingen, Iggingen, Leinzell, Lorch, Mögglingen, Mutlangen, Obergröningen, Ruppertshofen, Schechingen, Schwäbisch Gmünd, Spraitbach, Täferrot, and Waldstetten from the Ostalbkreis district and the municipalities of Allmersbach im Tal, Althütte, Aspach, Auenwald, Backnang, Burgstetten, Großerlach, Kirchberg an der Murr, Murrhardt, Oppenweiler, Spiegelberg, Sulzbach an der Murr, and Weissach im Tal from the Rems-Murr-Kreis district.

== History ==
Backnang – Schwäbisch Gmünd was created in 1965, then known as Schwäbisch Gmünd – Backnang. It acquired its current name in the 1980 election. In the 1965 through 1976 elections, it was constituency 175 in the numbering system. In the 1980 through 1998 elections, it was number 173. In the 2002 and 2005 elections, it was number 270. Since the 2009 election, it has been number 269.

Originally, the constituency comprised the districts of Schwäbisch Gmünd, Backnang, and parts of Schwäbisch Hall. It acquired its current borders in the 1980 election.

Election	No.	Name	Borders
1965	175	Schwäbisch Gmünd – Backnang	Schwäbisch Gmünd district; Backnang district; Schwäbisch Hall district
1969	175	Schwäbisch Gmünd – Backnang	Schwäbisch Gmünd district; Backnang district; Schwäbisch Hall district
1972	175	Schwäbisch Gmünd – Backnang	Schwäbisch Gmünd district; Backnang district; Schwäbisch Hall district
1976	175	Schwäbisch Gmünd – Backnang	Schwäbisch Gmünd district; Backnang district; Schwäbisch Hall district
1980	173	Backnang – Schwäbisch Gmünd	Ostalbkreis district (only Abtsgmünd, Bartholomä, Böbingen an der Rems, Durlangen, Eschach, Göggingen, Gschwend, Heubach, Heuchlingen, Iggingen, Leinzell, Lorch, Mögglingen, Mutlangen, Obergröningen, Ruppertshofen, Schechingen, Schwäbisch Gmünd, Spraitbach, Täferrot, and Waldstetten municipalities); Rems-Murr-Kreis district (only Allmersbach im Tal, Althütte, Aspach, Auenwald, Backnang, Burgstetten, Großerlach, Kirchberg an der Murr, Murrhardt, Oppenweiler, Spiegelberg, Sulzbach an der Murr, and Weissach im Tal municipalities)
1983	173	Backnang – Schwäbisch Gmünd	
1987	173	Backnang – Schwäbisch Gmünd	
1990	173	Backnang – Schwäbisch Gmünd	
1994	173	Backnang – Schwäbisch Gmünd	
1998	173	Backnang – Schwäbisch Gmünd	
2002	270	Backnang – Schwäbisch Gmünd	
2005	270	Backnang – Schwäbisch Gmünd	
2009	269	Backnang – Schwäbisch Gmünd	
2013	269	Backnang – Schwäbisch Gmünd	
2017	269	Backnang – Schwäbisch Gmünd	
2021	269	Backnang – Schwäbisch Gmünd	
2025	269	Backnang – Schwäbisch Gmünd	

== Members ==
The constituency has been held continuously by the Christian Democratic Union (CDU) since its creation. It was first represented by Eugen Gerstenmaier from 1965 to 1969, followed by Dieter Schulte from 1969 to 1998, a total of eight consecutive terms. Norbert Barthle was representative from 1998 to 2021. He was succeeded by Ingeborg Gräßle in 2021 and 2025.

Other members of parliament, elected via party list: Robert Antretter (SPD, 1980-1994), Christian Lange (SPD, 1998-2021), Ricarda Lang (Greens, 2021, 2025) and Ruben Rupp (AfD, 2025).

Election	Member	Party	%
1965	Eugen Gerstenmaier	CDU	50.1
1969	Dieter Schulte	CDU	48.6
1972	Dieter Schulte	CDU	51.7
1976	Dieter Schulte	CDU	55.7
1980	Dieter Schulte	CDU	54.0
1983	Dieter Schulte	CDU	59.2
1987	Dieter Schulte	CDU	53.8
1990	Dieter Schulte	CDU	50.4
1994	Dieter Schulte	CDU	49.6
1998	Norbert Barthle	CDU	41.8
2002	Norbert Barthle	CDU	47.7
2005	Norbert Barthle	CDU	48.8
2009	Norbert Barthle	CDU	44.7
2013	Norbert Barthle	CDU	55.4
2017	Norbert Barthle	CDU	41.2
2021	Ingeborg Gräßle	CDU	30.5
2025	Ingeborg Gräßle	CDU	36.6

== Election results ==
=== 2025 election ===
Federal election (2025): Backnang – Schwäbisch Gmünd
Notes:	Blue background denotes the winner of the electorate vote. Pink background denotes a candidate elected from their party list. Yellow background denotes an electorate win by a list member, or other incumbent. A ✓ or ✗ denotes status of any incumbent, win or lose respectively.						
Party	Candidate	Votes	%	±%	Party votes	%	±%
CDU	✓ Ingeborg Gräßle	53,070	36.6	▲6.1	47,465	32.6	▲6.7
AfD	Ruben Rupp	33,945	23.5	▲11.7	33,898	23.3	▲11.5
SPD	Tim-Luka Schwab	23,853	16.4	▼7.9	20,169	13.8	▼7.8
Greens	Ricarda Lang	15,498	10.7	▼0.9	15,531	10.7	▼3.1
FDP	Ruben Hühnerbein	5,844	4.0	▼8.0	7,846	5.4	▼10.4
Left	Nina Eisenmann	7,486	5.2	▲2.2	8,422	5.8	▲2.9
dieBasis				▼2.7	566	0.4	▼1.9
FW	Maximilian Schiebel	3,174	2.2	▼0.2	1,732	1.2	▼0.3
Tierschutzpartei					1,243	0.9	▼0.4
PARTEI	Carlo Geiger	2,040	1.4	▼0.3	809	0.6	▼0.5
Pirates							▼0.4
Team Todenhöfer							▼0.4
Bündnis C					348	0.2	0.0
ÖDP					287	0.5	▼0.1
Volt					795	0.5	▲0.3
BD					222	0.2	
Gesundheitsforschung							▼0.1
Bürgerbewegung							▼0.4
Humanists							▼0.1
BSW					6,290	4.3	
MLPD	Marianne Kolb	230	0.2	▲0.1	62	0.0	0.0
Informal votes		1,272			727		
Total valid votes		145,140			145,685		
Turnout		146,412	83.4	▲6.4			
CDU hold	Majority			▲6.1			

=== 2021 election ===
Federal election (2021): Backnang – Schwäbisch Gmünd
Notes:	Blue background denotes the winner of the electorate vote. Pink background denotes a candidate elected from their party list. Yellow background denotes an electorate win by a list member, or other incumbent. A ✓ or ✗ denotes status of any incumbent, win or lose respectively.						
Party	Candidate	Votes	%	±%	Party votes	%	±%
CDU	Ingeborg Gräßle	41,176	30.5	▼10.7	34,991	25.8	▼9.3
SPD	Tim-Luka Schwab	32,904	24.4	▲4.4	29,341	21.7	▲5.2
FDP	David-Sebastian Hamm	16,198	12.0	▲3.9	21,397	15.8	▲3.4
AfD	Andreas Wörner	15,802	11.7	▼1.5	15,979	11.8	▼2.6
Greens	Ricarda Lang	15,587	11.5	▲0.3	18,579	13.7	▲2.3
Left	Annette Keles	3,929	2.9	▼2.7	3,927	2.9	▼3.0
dieBasis	Stefan Schmidt	3,673	2.7		3,114	2.3	
FW	Gabriele Regele	3,286	2.4		2,026	1.5	▲1.0
Tierschutzpartei					1,646	1.2	▲0.3
PARTEI	Michael Schoder	2,308	1.7		1,485	1.1	▲0.5
Pirates					576	0.4	▼0.1
Team Todenhöfer					477	0.4	
Bündnis C					370	0.3	
ÖDP					338	0.2	▼0.1
Volt					271	0.2	
NPD					188	0.1	▼0.2
Gesundheitsforschung					178	0.1	
Bürgerbewegung					168	0.1	
Humanists					124	0.1	
DiB					91	0.1	▼0.1
MLPD	Marianne Kolb	138	0.1	▼0.1	70	0.1	0.0
Bündnis 21					42	0.0	
LKR					31	0.0	
DKP					15	0.0	0.0
Informal votes		1,435			1,012		
Total valid votes		135,001			135,424		
Turnout		136,436	77.1	▼0.2			
CDU hold	Majority	8,272	6.1	▼15.1			

=== 2017 election ===
Federal election (2017): Backnang – Schwäbisch Gmünd
Notes:	Blue background denotes the winner of the electorate vote. Pink background denotes a candidate elected from their party list. Yellow background denotes an electorate win by a list member, or other incumbent. A ✓ or ✗ denotes status of any incumbent, win or lose respectively.						
Party	Candidate	Votes	%	±%	Party votes	%	±%
CDU	✓ Norbert Barthle	55,595	41.2	▼14.1	47,588	35.2	▼13.2
SPD	Christian Lange	26,971	20.0	▼4.8	22,298	16.5	▼3.9
AfD	Daniel Lindenschmid	17,788	13.2		19,438	14.4	▲8.7
Greens	Melanie Lang	15,216	11.3	▲3.1	15,482	11.4	▲2.4
FDP	Gudrun Senta Wilhelm	10,882	8.1	▲5.3	16,717	12.4	▲6.6
Left	Alexander Relea-Linder	7,581	5.6	▲1.6	7,999	5.9	▲1.7
Tierschutzpartei					1,189	0.9	▲0.1
PARTEI					859	0.6	
Pirates					719	0.5	▼1.6
FW					690	0.5	▲0.2
ÖDP					465	0.3	0.0
NPD	Marina Djonovic	489	0.4	▼1.6	462	0.3	▼0.9
DM					265	0.2	
Tierschutzallianz					248	0.2	
BGE					210	0.2	
DiB					205	0.2	
V-Partei³					161	0.1	
Menschliche Welt					159	0.1	
MLPD	Marianne Kolb	279	0.2		91	0.1	0.0
DIE RECHTE					44	0.0	
DKP					22	0.0	
Informal votes		1,916			1,406		
Total valid votes		134,801			135,311		
Turnout		136,717	77.3	▲3.0			
CDU hold	Majority	28,624	21.2	▼9.4			

=== 2013 election ===
Federal election (2013): Backnang – Schwäbisch Gmünd
Notes:	Blue background denotes the winner of the electorate vote. Pink background denotes a candidate elected from their party list. Yellow background denotes an electorate win by a list member, or other incumbent. A ✓ or ✗ denotes status of any incumbent, win or lose respectively.						
Party	Candidate	Votes	%	±%	Party votes	%	±%
CDU	✓ Norbert Barthle	70,748	55.4	▲10.6	62,236	48.4	▲13.0
SPD	Christian Lange	31,673	24.8	▼0.1	26,198	20.4	▲0.8
Greens	Michael Straub	10,439	8.2	▼2.1	11,657	9.1	▼3.5
Left	Jörg Drechsel	5,079	4.0	▼2.6	5,454	4.2	▼2.9
Pirates	Sebastian Staudenmaier	3,856	3.0		2,761	2.1	▲0.4
FDP	Lisa Strotbek	3,541	2.8	▼7.6	7,420	5.8	▼12.8
AfD					7,268	5.7	
NPD	Benno Grunert	2,451	1.9	0.0	1,587	1.2	0.0
Tierschutzpartei					1,011	0.8	▲0.2
REP					547	0.4	▼0.9
PBC					514	0.4	▼0.3
FW					433	0.3	
ÖDP					424	0.3	▼0.1
RENTNER					402	0.3	
Volksabstimmung					245	0.2	0.0
Party of Reason					169	0.1	
PRO					122	0.1	
MLPD					76	0.1	0.0
BIG					55	0.0	
BüSo					29	0.0	0.0
Informal votes		2,468			1,647		
Total valid votes		127,787			128,608		
Turnout		130,255	74.2	▲2.5			
CDU hold	Majority	39,075	30.6	▲10.8			

=== 2009 election ===
Federal election (2009): Backnang – Schwäbisch Gmünd
Notes:	Blue background denotes the winner of the electorate vote. Pink background denotes a candidate elected from their party list. Yellow background denotes an electorate win by a list member, or other incumbent. A ✓ or ✗ denotes status of any incumbent, win or lose respectively.						
Party	Candidate	Votes	%	±%	Party votes	%	±%
CDU	✓ Norbert Barthle	55,492	44.7	▼4.1	44,068	35.4	▼5.7
SPD	Christian Lange	30,902	24.9	▼9.8	24,289	19.5	▼11.0
FDP	Markus Fischer	12,822	10.3	▲5.8	23,060	18.5	▲7.7
Greens	Ulrike Sturm	12,749	10.3	▲3.3	15,606	12.5	▲3.3
Left	Manfred Steidle	8,177	6.6	▲3.3	8,840	7.1	▲3.6
Pirates					2,229	1.8	
REP					1,608	1.3	▼0.1
NPD	Torsten Ziegler	2,404	1.9	▲0.3	1,578	1.3	▲0.1
PBC	Markus Grammel	1,240	1.0		909	0.7	▼0.1
Tierschutzpartei					777	0.6	
ÖDP					533	0.4	
DIE VIOLETTEN					329	0.3	
Independent	Matthias Riebesam	311	0.3				
Volksabstimmung					276	0.2	
MLPD					92	0.1	0.0
DVU					83	0.1	
BüSo					79	0.1	0.0
ADM					56	0.0	
Informal votes		2,504			2,189		
Total valid votes		124,097			124,412		
Turnout		126,601	71.8	▼6.2			
CDU hold	Majority	24,590	19.8	▲5.7			

=== 2005 election ===
Federal election (2005):Backnang – Schwäbisch Gmünd
Notes:	Blue background denotes the winner of the electorate vote. Pink background denotes a candidate elected from their party list. Yellow background denotes an electorate win by a list member, or other incumbent. A ✓ or ✗ denotes status of any incumbent, win or lose respectively.						
Party	Candidate	Votes	%	±%	Party votes	%	±%
CDU	✓ Norbert Barthle	65,471	48.8	▲1.1	55,177	41.1	▼3.1
SPD	Christian Lange	46,519	34.7	▼3.7	41,011	30.5	▼3.2
Greens	Alexander Schenk	9,366	7.0	▲0.7	12,406	9.2	▼1.0
FDP	Markus Fischer	6,129	4.6	▼0.9	14,546	10.8	▲3.7
Left	Peter Müller	4,422	3.3	▲2.3	4,711	3.5	▲2.7
NPD	Haiko Lattus	2,178	1.6		1,580	1.2	▲0.9
REP					1,905	1.4	▲0.1
PBC					1,144	0.9	▲0.1
Familie					928	0.7	
GRAUEN					641	0.5	▲0.3
MLPD					127	0.1	
BüSo					119	0.1	▲0.1
Informal votes		2,699			2,489		
Total valid votes		134,085			134,295		
Turnout		136,784	77.9	▼2.2			
CDU hold	Majority	18,952	14.1				
