= Schwäbisch Gmünd (electoral district) =

State electoral district of Germany

25: Schwäbisch Gmünd
- Electoral district for the Landtag of Baden-Württemberg
- Schwäbisch Gmünd in 2026
- District: Ostalbkreis
- Electorate: 109,633 (2026)
- Major settlements: Abtsgmünd, Bartholomä, Böbingen an der Rems, Durlangen, Eschach, Essingen, Göggingen, Gschwend, Heubach, Heuchlingen, Iggingen, Leinzell, Lorch, Mögglingen, Mutlangen, Obergröningen, Ruppertshofen, Schechingen, Schwäbisch Gmünd, Spraitbach, Täferrot, and Waldstetten

Current electoral district
- Party: CDU
- Member: Tim Bückner

Schwäbisch Gmünd is an electoral constituency (German: Wahlkreis) represented in the Landtag of Baden-Württemberg. Since 2026, it has elected one member via first-past-the-post voting. Voters cast a second vote under which additional seats are allocated proportionally state-wide. Under the constituency numbering system, it is designated as constituency 25. It is wholly within the district of Ostalbkreis.

== Geography ==
The constituency includes the municipalities of Abtsgmünd, Bartholomä, Böbingen an der Rems, Durlangen, Eschach, Essingen, Göggingen, Gschwend, Heubach, Heuchlingen, Iggingen, Leinzell, Lorch, Mögglingen, Mutlangen, Obergröningen, Ruppertshofen, Schechingen, Schwäbisch Gmünd, Spraitbach, Täferrot, and Waldstetten, within the district of Ostalbkreis.

There were 109,633 eligible voters in 2026.

== Members ==
=== First mandate ===
Both prior to and since the electoral reforms for the 2026 election, the winner of the plurality of the vote (first-past-the-post) in every constituency won the first mandate.

Election	Member	Party	%
1976	Erich Ganzenmüller	CDU	
1980	Helmut Ohnewald	CDU	
1984	Helmut Ohnewald	CDU	
1988	Helmut Ohnewald	CDU	
1992	Helmut Ohnewald	CDU	
1996	Stefan Scheffold	CDU	
2001	Stefan Scheffold	CDU	
2006	Stefan Scheffold	CDU	48.1
2011	Stefan Scheffold	CDU	43.9
2016	Stefan Scheffold	CDU	31.4
2021	Martina Häusler	Grüne	30.1
2026	Tim Bückner	CDU	39.0

=== Second mandate ===
Prior to the electoral reforms for the 2026 election, the seats in the state parliament were allocated proportionately amongst parties which received more than 5% of valid votes across the state. The seats that were won proportionally for parties that did not win as many first mandates as seats they were entitled to, were allocated to their candidates which received the highest proportion of the vote in their respective constituencies. This meant that following some elections, a constituency would have one or more members elected under a second mandate.

Prior to 2011, these second mandates were allocated to the party candidates who got the greatest number of votes, whilst from 2011-2021, these were allocated according to percentage share of the vote.

Election	Member	Party	Member	Party
1976	Ulrich Lang	SPD		
1980				
1984
1988
1992
1996
1997	Mario Capezzuto	SPD		
2001	Mario Capezzuto	SPD		
2006				
2011	Klaus Maier	SPD		
2016				
2021	Tim Bückner	CDU	Ruben Rupp	AfD

== Election results ==
=== 2026 election ===
State election (2026): Schwäbisch Gmünd
Notes:	Blue background denotes the winner of the electorate vote. Pink background denotes a candidate elected from their party list. Yellow background denotes an electorate win by a list member, or other incumbent. A ✓ or ✗ denotes status of any incumbent, win or lose respectively.						
Party	Candidate	Votes	%	±%	Party votes	%	±%
CDU	Tim Buckner	29,684	39.0	▲13.2	24,928	32.6	▲6.8
AfD	Günter Rentschar	16,831	22.1	▲10.1	16,571	21.7	▲9.7
Greens	✗ Martina Häusler	16,604	21.8	▼8.3	20,776	27.1	▼3.0
SPD	Ulrike Freifrau von Streit	5,886	7.7	▼3.1	4,066	5.3	▼5.5
Left	Nina Eisenmann	3,294	4.3	▲0.9	2,652	3.5	Steady
FDP	Chris-Robert Berendt	2,595	3.4	▼7.4	2,998	3.9	▼6.9
BSW					1,091	1.4	
FW					1,070	1.4	
APT					667	0.9	
PARTEI	Charlie Knödler	1,303	1.7	Steady	450	0.6	▼1.1
Volt					344	0.4	
dieBasis					202	0.3	▼0.8
Values					149	0.2	
Bündnis C					147	0.2	
Pensioners					118	0.2	
ÖDP					85	0.1	▼0.5
Team Todenhöfer					81	0.1	
Verjüngungsforschung					46	0.1	
PdF					43	0.1	
Humanists					25	0.0	
KlimalisteBW					22	0.0	▼0.7
Informal votes		797			463		
Total valid votes		76,197			76,531		
Turnout		76,994	70.2	▲6.1			
CDU gain from Greens	Majority	12,853	16.9				

=== 2021 election ===
State election (2026): Schwäbisch Gmünd
Party	Candidate	Votes	%	±%
Greens	Martina Häusler	20,712	30.1	▲4.5
CDU	Tim Bückner	17,723	25.8	▼5.6
AfD	Ruben Rupp	8,243	12.0	▼4.2
FDP	Chris-Robert Berendt	7,453	10.8	▲3.7
SPD	Jakob Unrath	7,441	10.8	▼2.8
Left	Christian Zeeb	2,360	3.4	▲0.6
Independent	Gabriele Regele	1,446	2.1	
PARTEI	Vera Melina Kayser	1,178	1.7	
dieBasis	Karlheinz Siegmund	723	1.1	
WiR2020	Sabine Lamla	620	0.9	
KlimalisteBW	Martin Rust	474	0.7	
ÖDP	Karl-Heinz Bok	405	0.6	Steady
Majority		2,989	4.3	
Rejected ballots		540	0.8	▼0.4
Turnout		69,318	64.1	▼6.9
Registered electors		108,098		
Greens gain from CDU		Swing		

== See also ==
- Politics of Baden-Württemberg
- Landtag of Baden-Württemberg
