= Frickenhofer Höhe =

Hill range in Baden-Württemberg, Germany

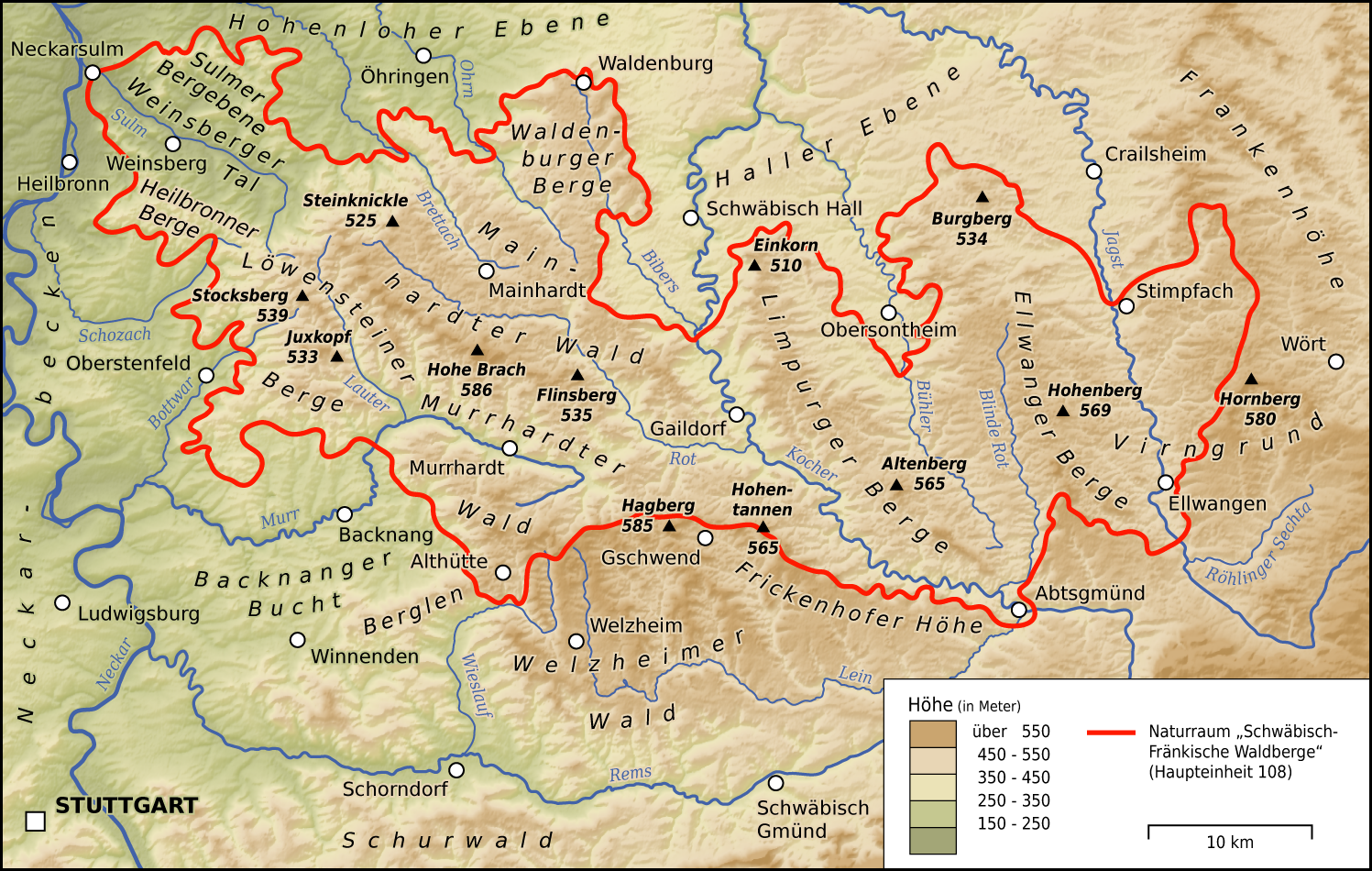
- The Frickenhofer Höhe south of the Naturraums Swabian-Franconian Forest

Highest point
- Peak: Hohentannen
- Elevation: 565.4 m above NHN

Geography
- Location within Baden-Württemberg
- State(s): Ostalbkreis and Schwäbisch Hall, Baden-Württemberg, Germany
- Range coordinates: 48°59′21″N 9°47′21″E
- Parent range: Swabian-Franconian Forest

The Frickenhofer Höhe is hill range, up to 565.4 m above sea level (NHN), in the German state of Baden-Württemberg. Most of the range falls within the county of im Ostalbkreis but its northern spurs reach into Schwäbisch Hall. The elongated plateau-like region is named after the village of Frickenhofen, a settlement on the narrow northwest tip of the hills in the municipality of Gschwend.

== Geography ==
=== Location ===
The Frickenhofer Höhe is located south of the Limpurg Hills, north of Albuch, a part of the Swabian Jura, and east of the Welzheim Forest. The range lies in a triangle formed by the towns of Gaildorf to the northwest, Aalen to the southeast and Schwäbisch Gmünd to the southwest. It takes the shape of an elongated arc running from Schönberg (borough of Gaildorf) in the north to Abtsgmünd in the southeast. Municipalities within the region include Gschwend, Eschach, Göggingen, Ruppertshofen and Schechingen.

The northern boundary of the Frickenhofer Höhe and its spurs is the lowest reaches of the ”Fichtenberger” Rot, a river that approaches from the west and empties into the River Kocher near Gaildorf-Unterrot. The other boundaries, running anti-clockwise, are the “Gschwender” Rot and its two headstreams, the Lein and Kocher. The Gschwender Rot flows out of Gschwend southwards through the small villages of Birkenlohe, Hönig and the Rehnenmühle Retention Basin to its mouth on the Lein in Täferrot and demarcates the range to the west where it adjoins the Welzheim Forest. The Lein initially rns to Heuchlingen in an easterly direction. It forms the southern boundary as it heads northeast to its mouth on the Kocher in Abtsgmünd, separating the range from the Welland. The left side of the Kocher valley from Abtsgmünd via Sulzbach-Laufen to Unterrot is its most prominent dividing line with the Limpurg Hills.

=== Hills ===
The hillsides of the Frickenhofer Höhe are steep and thickly wooded. The heights themselves are plateau-like with summits that rise only a little way above the surrounding area. The highest point is the Hohentannen at 565.4 m, between Frickenhofen and Rotenhar. This is easily reached from the hiking carp park "Hohetannen" on the road between Frickenhofen and Rotenhar. From here there is a good view over the forested heights and valleys of the Keuper Uplands with its "stuben" sandstone areas and Early Jurassic outliers. To the north the view extends to the Hohenlohe Plain and the Traufbucht of the Kocher near Schwäbisch Hall. To the south may be seen the Kaiserberge and the foreland of the Jura and its Albtrauf.

The hills and subpeaks of the Frickenhofer Höhe include (some only named after their fields) the following (sorted by height in metres (m) above Normalhöhennull (NHN):

- Hohentannen (565.4 m), immediately east of Gschwend-Rotenhar, with the nearby Teufelskanzel ("Devil's Pulpit")
- Wolfäcker (554.4 m), 600 m north of Gschwend-Mittelbronn
- Strietfeld (551.0 m), between Gschwend-Mittelbronn and Gschwend-Ottenried
- Rehbürg (529.3 m), 700 m north-northwest of Ruppertshofen-Steinenbach
- Galgenberg (517.2 m), 400 m south-southeast of Obergröningen
