= Eschach, Germany =

Eschach
- Municipality
- Coat of arms

- Location of Eschach within Ostalbkreis district
- Interactive map of Eschach
- Location within Germany Location within Baden-Württemberg
- Coordinates: 48°53′18″N 09°52′11″E
- Country: Germany
- State: Baden-Württemberg
- Admin. region: Stuttgart
- District: Ostalbkreis

Government
  - Mayor (2018–26): Jochen König

Area
  - Total: 20.28 km^{2} (7.83 sq mi)
- Elevation: 498 m (1,634 ft)

Population (2025-12-31)
  - Total: 1,881
  - Density: 92.75/km^{2} (240.2/sq mi)
- Time zone: UTC+01:00 (CET)
  - Summer (DST): UTC+02:00 (CEST)
- Postal codes: 73569
- Dialling codes: 07175
- Vehicle registration: AA
- Website: www.eschach.de

Eschach (German: [ˈɛʃax]) is a municipality in the German state of Baden-Württemberg, in Ostalbkreis district.

== Geography ==
=== Geographical Location ===
Eschach has a share of the natural regions Eastern Swabian Foothills (Östliches Albvorland) and Swabian-Franconian Mountain Forests (Schwäbisch-Fränkische Waldberge), both of which belong to the Swabian Keuper-Lias Lands. It is located north of Schwäbisch Gmünd on the Frickenhofer Höhe, a ridge that stretches southwest of the Kocher River.

=== Neighboring Municipalities ===
The municipality borders Sulzbach-Laufen in Schwäbisch Hall district to the north, Abtsgmünd to the northeast, Obergröningen to the east, Schechingen to the southeast, Göggingen to the south, Täferrot to the southwest, and Ruppertshofen and Gschwend to the west.

=== Municipal Subdivisions ===
In addition to the eponymous Eschach, the municipality consists of the hamlets Batschenhof, Helpertshofen, Holzhausen, Kemnaten, Seifertshofen, Vellbach and Waldmannshofen, the farms Dietenhalden, Gehrenhof, Götzenmühle and Hirnbuschhöfle, as well as the deserted village of Alt-Dissenberg.

=== Land Use Distribution ===
According to data from the Statistical Office of Baden-Württemberg, as of 2014, the land was distributed as follows

- 32.2% Forest area
- 57.7% Agricultural area
- 0.3% Water area
- 0.2% Recreational area
- 4.7% Building and open space area
- 4.7% Transportation area
- 0.1% Other areas

== History ==
=== History until the Mediatization ===
Eschach is an ancient settlement area, as evidenced by the numerous finds and remains from various settlement periods, originating from the Middle and Late Stone Age, as well as from the Celtic period and the time of the Alamannic landtaking in the 8th century. The farms likely originated during this time. Under the Staufer emperors in the 12th century, more extensive settlement took place. After that, the Counts of Oettingen were mainly the local lords in Eschach. In 1359, they sold all their rights and properties to the Lords of Hohenrechberg. The Lorch Monastery, the town of Schwäbisch Gmünd, and the Counts of Adelmannsfelden also had properties in Eschach. The Schenken of Limpurg gradually acquired the entire property of the municipality by 1586.

During the Thirty Years' War from 1618 to 1648, troop marches of friend and foe, usually accompanied by plundering, murder, and extortion, were commonplace. In its wake, the terrible war also brought famine, starvation, and the plague. After the end of the war, the population of Eschach had severely declined. It took years until the war damage was finally repaired.

The two world wars of the 20th century also left their marks in Eschach. At the end of the war, the municipality had only 900 inhabitants. At that time, the population was mainly employed in agriculture and local trades. After the war, many displaced persons found a new home in Eschach. They, too, contributed to the general development of the municipality and the economic upswing.

=== Since Belonging to Württemberg ===
Through the mediatization of 1806 in accordance with the Rheinbund Act, Eschach and its subdivisions fell to the Kingdom of Württemberg. With the establishment of the new superior authorities of Gaildorf and Gmünd in 1807, Eschach with Seifertshofen was assigned to the Oberamt of Gaildorf, while the other subdivisions were initially assigned to the Oberamt of Gmünd. A year later, they too fell under the Oberamt of Gaildorf.

During the Nazi era in Württemberg, Eschach was finally assigned to the Schwäbisch Gmünd district in 1938, along with all its subdivisions. After World War II, the area of the municipality was located in the American occupation zone and thus in the newly founded state of Württemberg-Baden, which merged into the present state of Baden-Württemberg in 1952. Since the district reform of 1973, Eschach has belonged to the Ostalbkreis district and, together with the municipalities of Göggingen, Iggingen, Leinzell, Obergröningen and Schechingen, forms the municipal association Leintal-Frickenhofer Höhe.

Through the development of new residential and commercial areas and the creation of further public facilities, the once agriculturally characterized municipality became an attractive residential community. As of 31 December 2009, it had a population of 1,817, many of whom work in local companies or in neighboring municipalities and towns.

== Religions ==
After the introduction of the Reformation, Eschach was predominantly Protestant. The Protestant church community of Eschach has belonged to the Church District of Schwäbisch Gmünd of the Württemberg State Church since 1951.

== Politics ==
=== Administrative Association ===
The municipality belongs to the Leintal-Frickenhofer Höhe municipal association based in Leinzell.

=== Mayor ===
Mayor Reinhold Daiss was re-elected for a third term in 2002. He retired on 28 July 2010. The population elected Jochen König as his successor in the second round on 27 June 2010, at that time still a student at the University of Public Administration and Finance in Ludwigsburg. With a voter turnout of 74.9%, König won 46% of the votes.

On 10 June 2018, Mayor Jochen König was re-elected with 59.6% of the votes and a voter turnout of 48%.

=== Coat of Arms ===
Coat of arms of Eschach

In silver on a green hill topped with a silver wave bar, a green ash tree between two green fern fronds growing from the hill.

As a canting arms, the municipality bears an ash tree; the wave bar refers to the source of the Fischbach stream. The fern fronds merely serve as filling, comparable to supporters.

The municipal flag is green-white.

As early as 1832, the municipality used the ash tree as an image on the municipal seal, though at that time without an escutcheon. In 1926, the ash tree was established as the arms, with a triple mount and fern fronds added. The tinctures were also introduced in 1926. In 1956, the municipality revised the arms to the current, heraldically improved design.

On 26 November 1956, the municipality was granted its current arms and flag by the Interior Ministry of Baden-Württemberg.

== Culture and Attractions ==
Eschach lies along the Idyllische Straße, a vacation route that passes by many sights.

Particularly popular is the "Kneipp Facility at the Baach" established in 2014. This idyllically situated Kneipp facility with wading pools and arm baths at the western edge of the village was built completely by volunteers from the surrounding residents and enjoys great popularity even beyond the region.

=== Museums ===
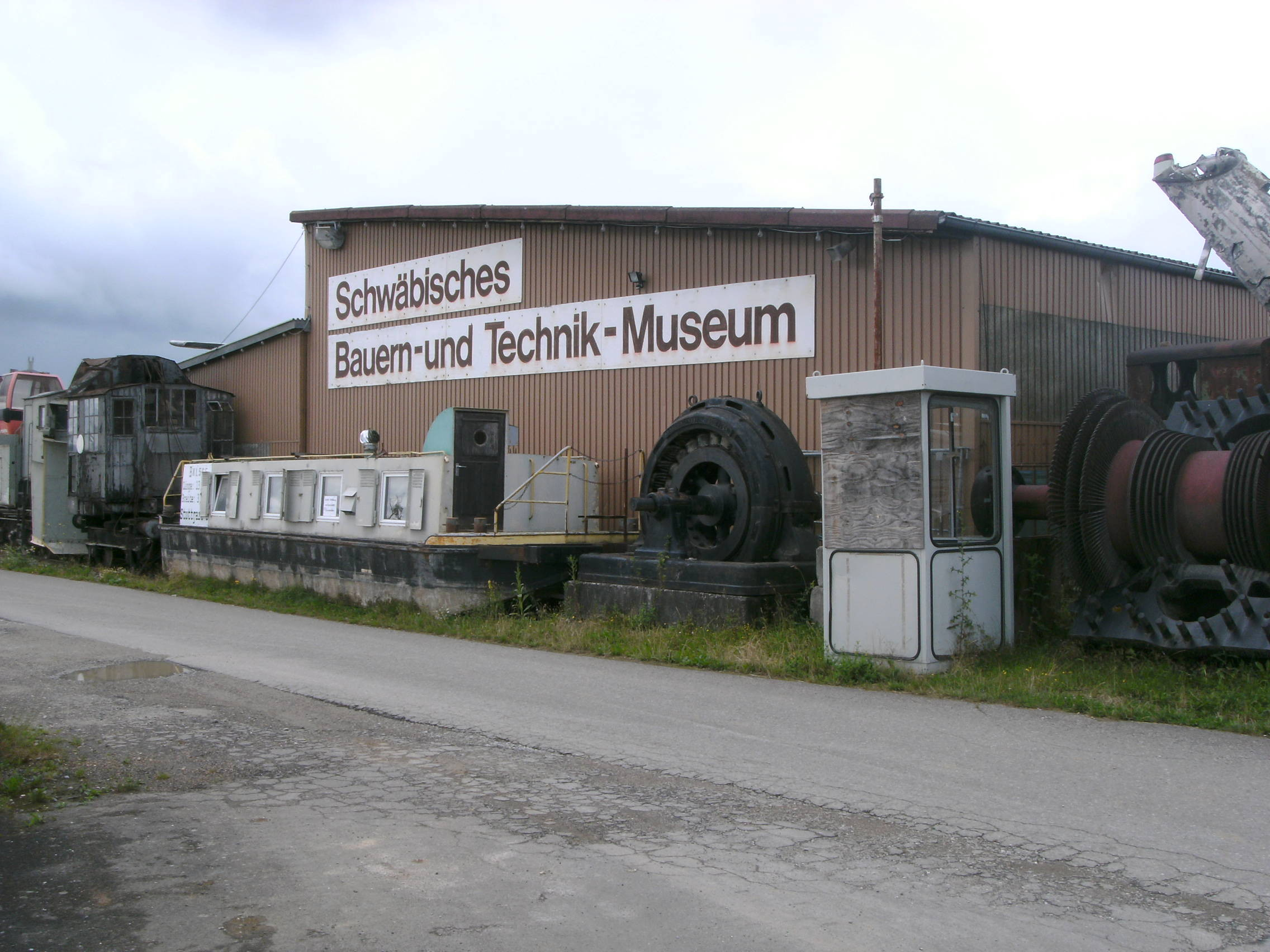
Swabian Farming and Technology Museum

Since 1984, the privately operated Swabian Farming and Technology Museum has been located in the district of Seifertshofen. It contains a collection of old implements, predominantly of a technical nature, including many old tractors, for example the Lanz Bulldog brand, as well as much old military equipment, locomotives and aircraft. Since 2009, the museum has housed the steel bridge of the former Schwäbisch Gmünd–Göppingen railway line over the Rems river. Once a year, towards the end of August, the "Lanz Bulldog and Steam Festival" takes place.

== Economy and Infrastructure ==
=== Transport ===
Eschach lies directly on the L 1080 and L 1157 state roads and is 5 kilometers from the B 19 (Abtsgmünd–Gaildorf) and 10 kilometers from the B 29 (Aalen–Stuttgart) federal highways. The A 7 motorway at Westhausen is 25 kilometers away. The nearest railway station is in Schwäbisch Gmünd on the Rems Railway.

=== Public Facilities ===
- Town Hall
- Elementary School
- Kindergarten
- Municipal Yard
- Gymnasium

=== Education ===
There is an elementary school in Eschach with all-day care. All secondary schools are located in the surrounding towns (general education and vocational high schools in Schwäbisch Gmünd) and municipalities (e.g. the secondary modern school in Leinzell).
