= Welzheim Forest =

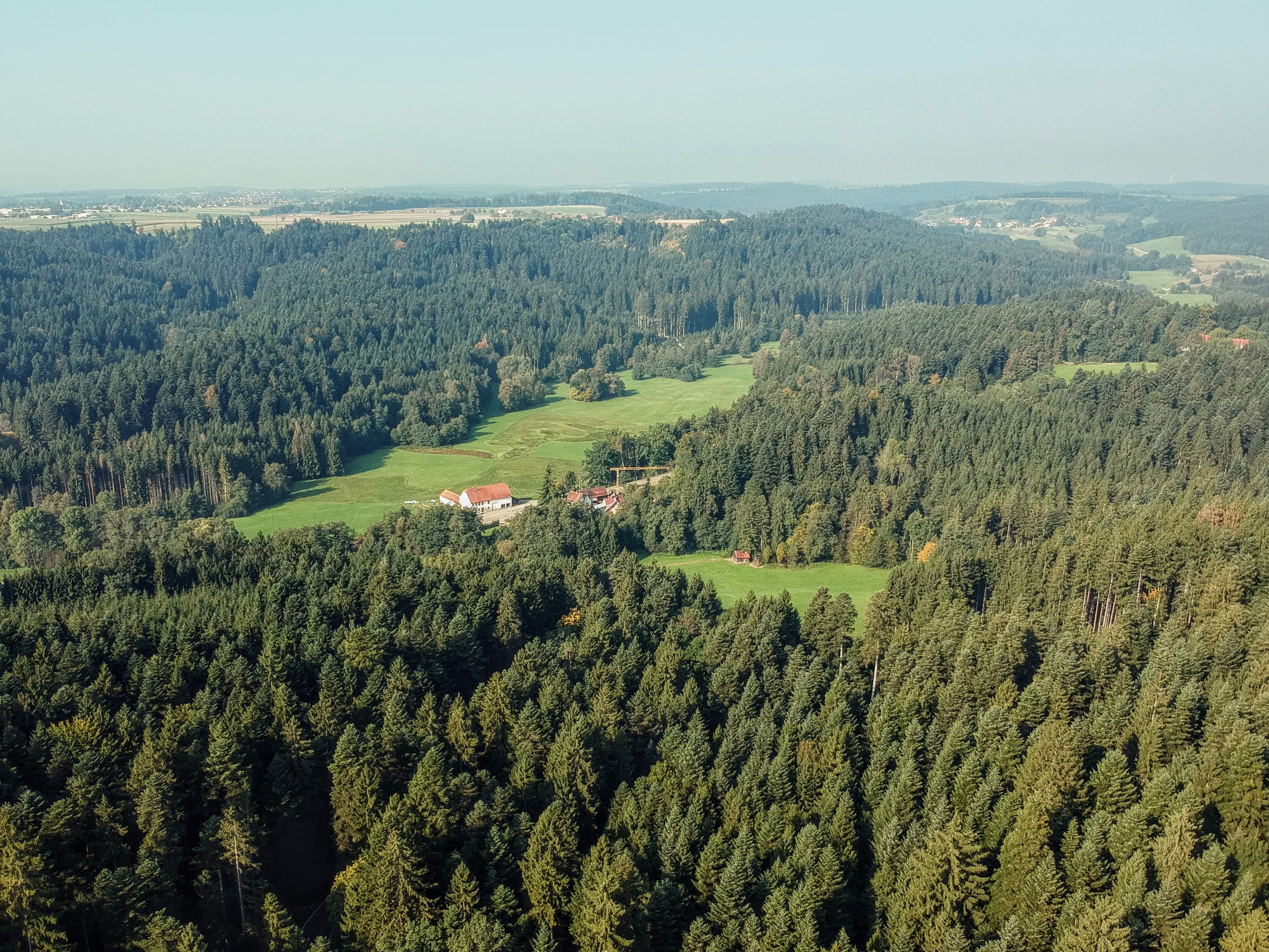
- View over the Leintal and Welzheimer Wald.

Highest point
- Peak: Hagberg
- Elevation: 585.2 m above NHN

Geography
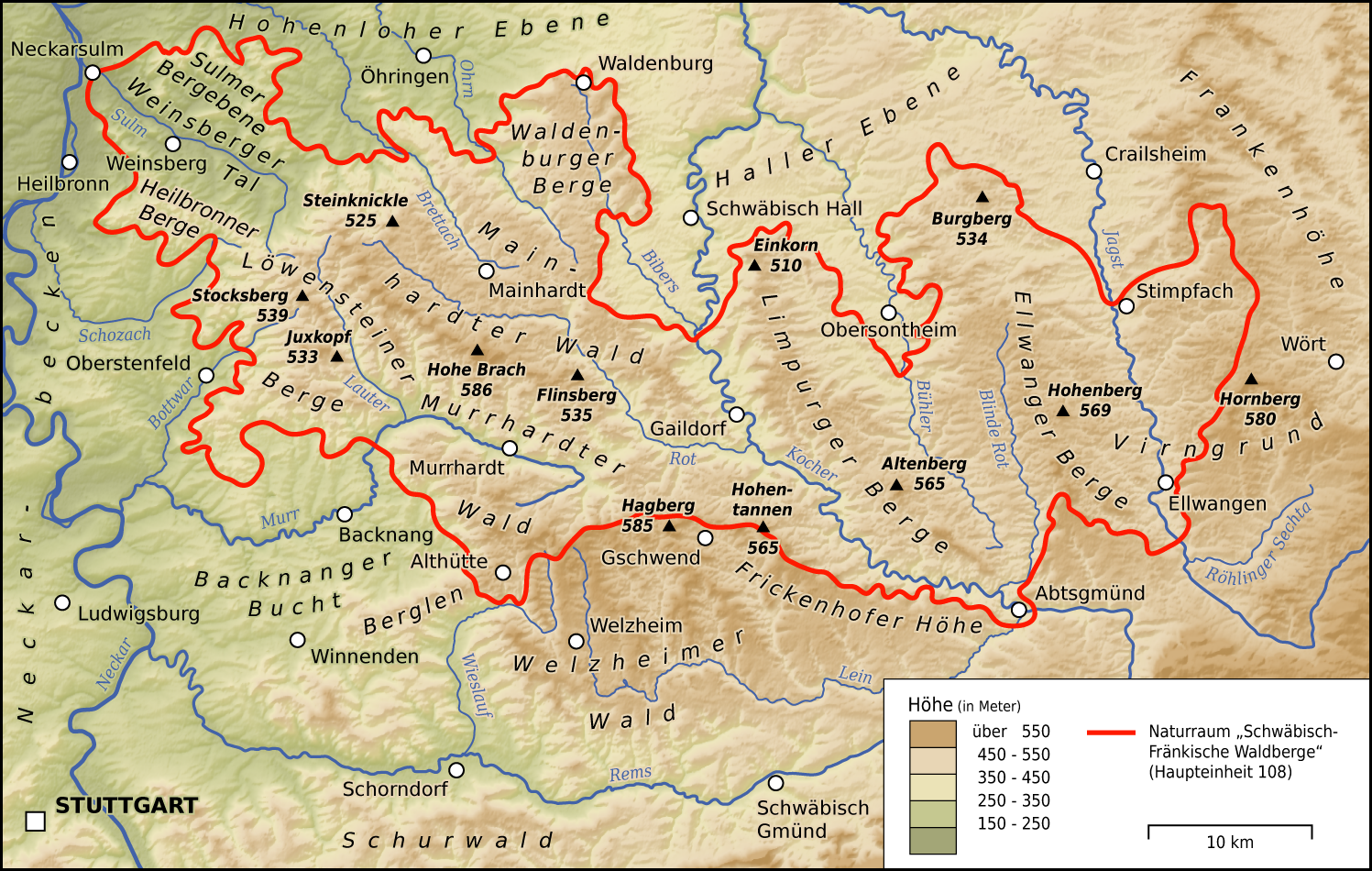
- The Welzheim Forest south of the hill range of the Swabian-Franconian Forest
- State(s): Counties of Schwäbisch Hall, Rems-Murr-Kreis and Ostalbkreis; Baden-Württemberg
- Range coordinates: 48°56′24″N 9°42′40″E
- Parent range: Swabian-Franconian Forest

The Welzheim Forest (German: Welzheimer Wald) is a wooded, hill ridge, up to 585.2 m above sea level (NHN), in the counties of Rems-Murr, Ostalb and Schwäbisch Hall in Baden-Württemberg (Germany).

== Geography ==
=== Location ===
The Welzheim Forest lies just under 38 kilometres east-northeast of Stuttgart and about 45 kilometres southeast of Heilbronn between the Murrhardt Forest and the Mainhardt Forest in the north, the Frickenhofer Höhe in the east-northeast, the Albuch in the southeast, the Schurwald in the southwest and the Berglen and Buocher Höhe in the west.

At the same time, the Welzheim Forest is one of five forest regions in the Swabian-Franconian Forest Nature Park. As a natural region it is, however, not counted with the Swabian-Franconian Forest but, together with the Schurwald and the Berglen, forms its own natural region. It takes its name from the town of Welzheim in the centre of the region.

The Welzheim Forest is located around Welzheim, Kaisersbach and Alfdorf roughly between Fichtenberg to the north, Gschwend to the northeast, Spraitbach and Durlangen to the east, Mutlangen and Schwäbisch Gmünd to the southeast, Lorch to the south, Plüderhausen, Urbach and Schorndorf to the southwest, Berglen to the west and Rudersberg and Althütte to the northwest.

=== Hills ===
Amongst the hills of the Welzheim Forest are the following – sorted by height in metres above Normalhöhennull (NHN):

- Hagberg (585.2 m), with the Hagberg Tower; west of Gschwend-Hagkling
- Lichte Eichen (554.3 m), north-northwest of Welzheim-Langenberg
- Haube (536.5 m), immediately northeast of Rudersberg-Mannenberg
- Hohbergkopf (498.8 m), northeast of Plüderhausen
- Kelchenberg (496.1 m), west-southwest of Pfahlbronn
- Heuberg (476.6 m), northeast of Urbach
