= Barthle =

Barthle is a surname. Notable people with the surname include:

- Hans Barthle, German World War II soldier
- Norbert Barthle (born 1952), German politician
