= Anja Jantschik =

German journalist and writer (1969–2024)

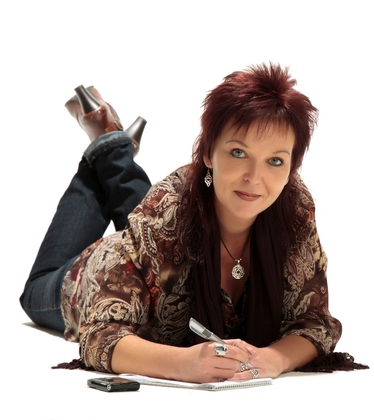
- Jantschik in 2014
- Born: 28 May 1969; Mutlangen, Baden-Württemberg, West Germany
- Died: 13 September 2024 (aged 55)
- Occupations: Writer and journalist
- Years active: 2006–2024
- Website: (in German)

Anja Jantschik (28 May 1969 – 13 September 2024) was a German journalist and writer, mainly known for her crime novels.

== Biography ==
Anja Jantschik was born in Mutlangen 1969. Her father was a goldsmith in Schwäbisch Gmünd. She developed an early talent in the writer's guild. Since the mid-1990s, she has worked as a freelance journalist for several newspapers, including the Gmünder Tagespost in Ostalbkreis.

She published her first novel in 2006, a thriller with the title Mord zwischen den Zeilen. The first five Ostalb thrillers were published by Unicorn Publishing House in Schwäbisch Gmünd. As a crime writer she read from their works regularly as part of cultural festivals and cultural events.

Jantschik lived in Göggingen. She died on 13 September 2024, at the age of 55.

== Selected works ==
- Jantschik, Anja (2006). Mord zwischen den Zeilen (in German). Schwäbisch Gmünd. ISBN 978-3-936373-26-4. OCLC 180915854.
- —— (2007). Blauäugig! : [Ostalbkrimi] (in German). Schwäbisch Gmünd: Einhorn-Verl. ISBN 978-3-936373-30-1. OCLC 188267803.
- —— (2008). Naturtod. Schwäbisch Gmünd. ISBN 978-3-936373-44-8. OCLC 723920258.
- —— (2010). Im Schatten des Einhorns (in German). Schwäbisch Gmünd. ISBN 978-3-936373-47-9. OCLC 663479242.
- —— (2012). Blutgarn. Schwäbisch Gmünd. ISBN 978-3-936373-74-5. OCLC 819513887.
- —— (2014). Mordtrieb. Schwäbisch Gmünd. ISBN 978-3-00-045120-1. OCLC 881301299.
- —— (2015). Remsmord. Schwäbisch Gmünd. ISBN 978-3-00-050643-7. OCLC 932016311.
- —— (2019). Mordschau (in German). Schwäbisch Gmünd: Einhorn-Verlag+Druck GmbH. ISBN 978-3-95747-087-4. OCLC 1096286619.
- —— (2020). Klopfzeichen (in German). Schwäbisch Gmünd. ISBN 978-3-95747-099-7. OCLC 1196180349.
- —— (2021). Das Schweigen der Frauen (in German). Schwäbisch Gmünd. ISBN 978-3-95747-124-6. OCLC 1291282088.
