= Mögglingen =

- Municipality
- Coat of arms

- Location of Mögglingen within Ostalbkreis district
- Interactive map of Mögglingen
- Location within Germany Location within Baden-Württemberg
- Coordinates: 48°49′24″N 09°57′45″E
- Country: Germany
- State: Baden-Württemberg
- Admin. region: Stuttgart
- District: Ostalbkreis

Government
  - Mayor (2022–30): Adrian Schlenker

Area
  - Total: 10.27 km^{2} (3.97 sq mi)
- Elevation: 413 m (1,355 ft)

Population (2025-12-31)
  - Total: 4,300
  - Density: 420/km^{2} (1,100/sq mi)
- Time zone: UTC+01:00 (CET)
  - Summer (DST): UTC+02:00 (CEST)
- Postal codes: 73563
- Dialling codes: 07174
- Vehicle registration: AA
- Website: www.moegglingen.de

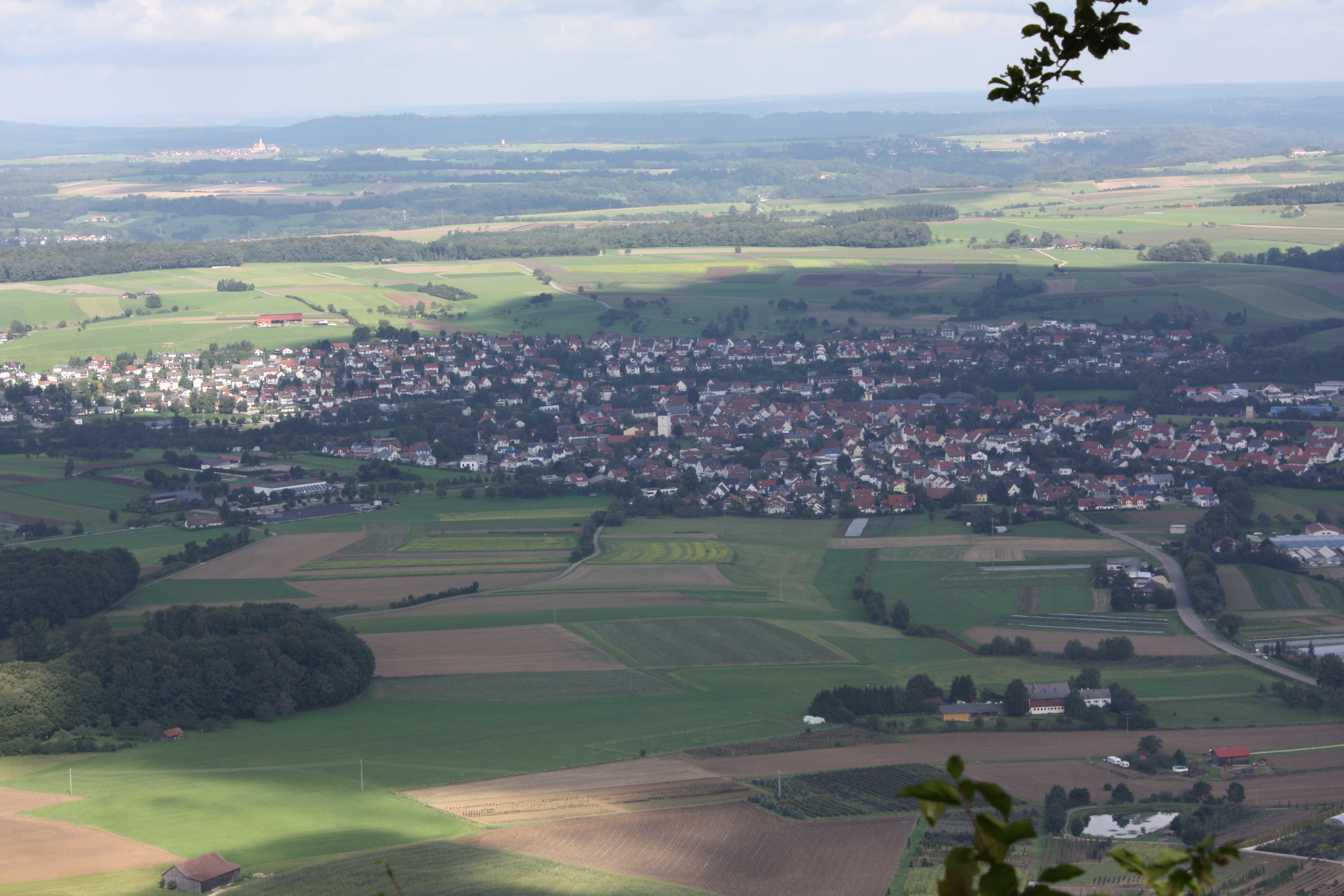
Mögglingen

Mögglingen (German pronunciation: [ˈmœɡlɪŋən]) is a municipality in the German state of Baden-Württemberg, in Ostalbkreis district.

== Geography ==
Mögglingen is positioned at between 398 and 475 meters above sea level, along the upper Rems valley in the north-eastern foothills of the "Swabian Jura" between Schwäbisch Gmünd (13 km / 8 miles) and administrative centre of the Ostalbkreis, Aalen (11 km / 7 miles).

== Neighbouring communities ==
The municipality is bordering to the north to Heuchlingen, to the east to Essingen, in the south to the town Heubach and to the west to Böbingen an der Rems.

== History ==
The first mention of Mögglingen was in the year 1143. The place belonged for a long time to the land territory of the Reichstadt Schwäbisch Gmünd. As soon as Schwäbisch Gmünd fell due to the Reichsdeputationshauptschluss in 1803 to the Kingdom of Württemberg, also Mögglingen became part of Württemberg and belonged to the newly formed Oberamt Gmünd, from 1938 Schwäbisch Gmünd. When this was dissolved by the district reform Baden-Württemberg 1973, Mögglingen became part of the newly formed Ostalbkreis.

== Religions ==
Mögglingen remained Catholic even after the introduction of the Reformation in Württemberg, because most of the goods belonged to citizens and monasteries of the free catholic city Gmünd. Believers today belong to the Roman Catholic Church of St. Peter and Paul. A Protestant church was built only in 1968.

== Bypass plans ==
Locals have campaigned for a bypass round Mögglingen since at least as far back as 1957, and by 2013 plans for such a bypass had been agreed for fifteen years. Former mayor Ottmar Schweizer is on record as having pushed for the construction of the bypass throughout his 24 years in office. The curving and relatively narrow high street has been part of a long distance route for many years, but the number of heavy trucks passing through small towns like Mögglingen rose substantially after 2005 which was the year in which Germany introduced Autobahn tolls for trucks above twelve tonnes gross weight. Continuing failure to construct the planned bypass is blamed on an absence of funding.

== Population Development ==
- 1871: 1,003
- 1900: 1,058
- 1933: 1,443
- 1950: 2,150
- 1970: 2,933
- 1987: 3,316
- 2000: 3,884
- 2005: 4,167
- 2010: 4,180
- 2021: 4,267

== Politics ==
=== Council ===
The council includes after the elections from May 25, 2014, 14 members. The election brought the following results:

- FUMB (Free and Independent Mögglinger citizens) 30.16% (+0.48) = 4 seats (± 0)
- CDU 27.48% (-5.13) = 4 seats (-1)
- JMB (Young Mögglinger citizens) 22.62% (+2.23) = 3 seats (± 0)
- SPD 19.74% (+2.49) = 3 seats (+1)

== Personality ==
=== Sons and daughters of the town ===
- Anton Vogt (born 1891, † unknown), politician (NSDAP)

=== Associated with the community ===
- Carl-Uwe Steeb (born 1967), former professional tennis player, grew up in Mögglingen.
- Steffen Dangelmayr (born 1978), football player, comes from the youth department of the Stern FC Mögglingen

== Literature ==
- Karl Eduard Paulus: Mögglingen . In: Description of Oberamts Gmünd . Publisher Lindemann, Stuttgart 1870 (Full text at Wikisource)
