= Christian Lange (politician) =

German politician

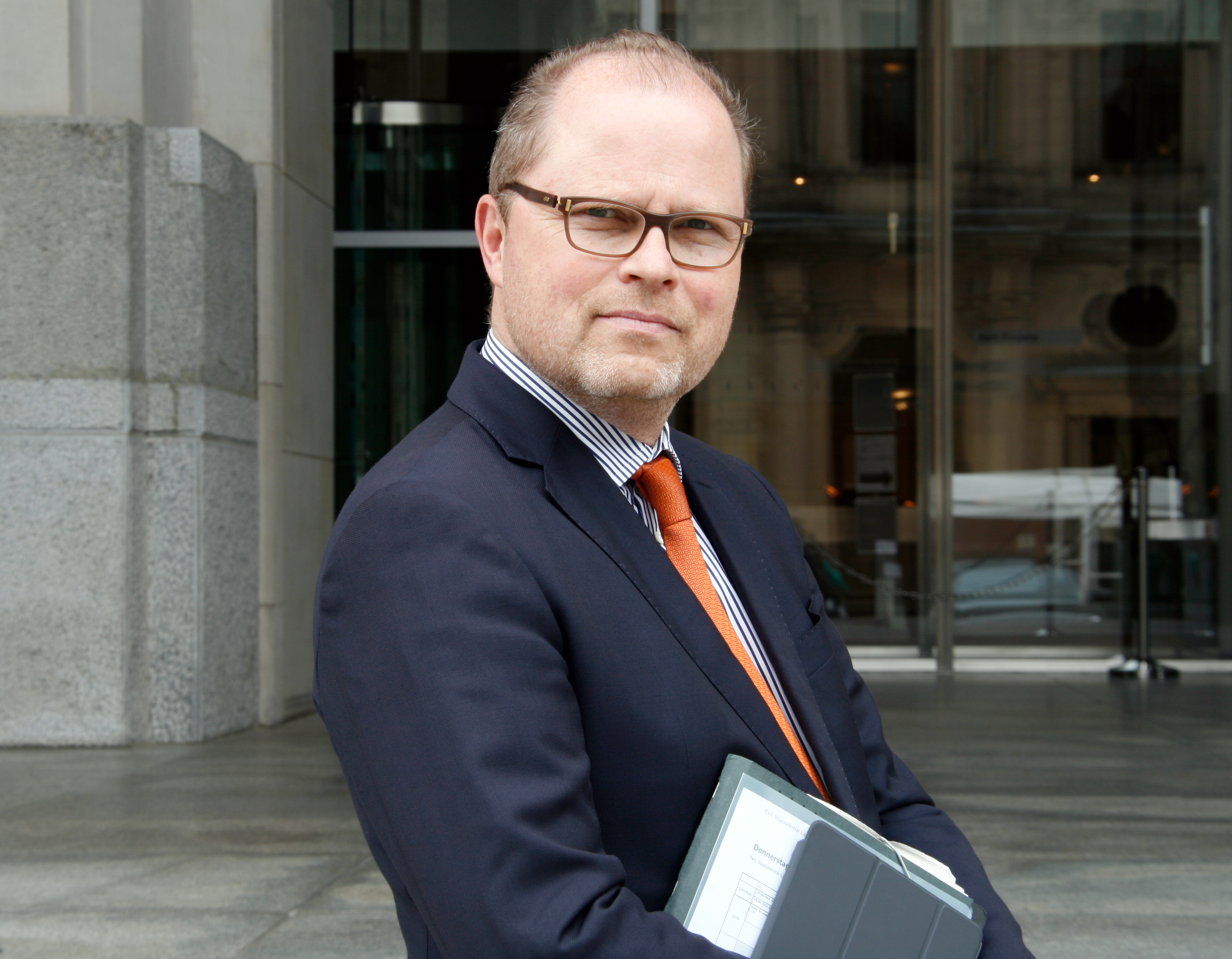
- Christian Lange in 2016

Member of the Bundestag
- In office 1998–2021

Personal details
- Born: 27 February 1967 (age 59) Saarlouis, West Germany (now Germany)
- Party: SPD

Christian Lange (born 27 February 1967) is a German lawyer and former politician of the Social Democratic Party (SPD) who served as a member of the Bundestag from the state of Baden-Württemberg from 1998 until 2021.

== Political career ==
Born in Saarlouis, Saarland, Lange became a member of the Bundestag in the 1998 German federal election.

In parliament, Lange initially was a member of the Committee on Economic Affairs. From 2009 to 2013, he served on the Committee on the Election of Judges (Wahlausschuss), which is in charge of appointing judges to the Federal Constitutional Court of Germany, and also served on the Committee on the Election of Judges (Wahlausschuss), which is in charge of appointing judges to the Federal Constitutional Court of Germany, and on the parliamentary body in charge of appointing judges to the Highest Courts of Justice, namely the Federal Court of Justice (BGH), the Federal Administrative Court (BVerwG), the Federal Fiscal Court (BFH), the Federal Labour Court (BAG), and the Federal Social Court (BSG).

Within his parliamentary group, Lange led the group of SPD members from Baden-Württemnberg from 2002 to 2013.

In addition to his committee assignments, Lange chaired the German-Portuguese Parliamentary Friendship Group from 2003 to 2018.

From 2013 to 2021, Lange served as Parliamentary State Secretary to successive Ministers of Justice and Consumer Protection Heiko Maas (2013–2018), Katarina Barley (2018–2019) and Christine Lambrecht (2019–2021).

In June 2020, Lange announced that he would not stand in the 2021 federal elections but instead resign from active politics by the end of the parliamentary term.

== Life after politics ==
Since 2023, Lange has been working as a Senior Adviser at Roland Berger.
