= Daniel Lindenschmid =

German politician (born 1992)

Member of the Landtag of Baden-Württemberg
- Incumbent
- Assumed office 11 May 2021

Personal details
- Born: 5 May 1992 (age 33) Nürtingen
- Party: Alternative for Germany (since 2013)

Daniel Lindenschmid (born 5 May 1992 in Nürtingen) is a German politician serving as a member of the Landtag of Baden-Württemberg since 2021. He has served as chief whip of the Alternative for Germany since 2023.
