= Norbert Barthle =

German politician (born 1952)

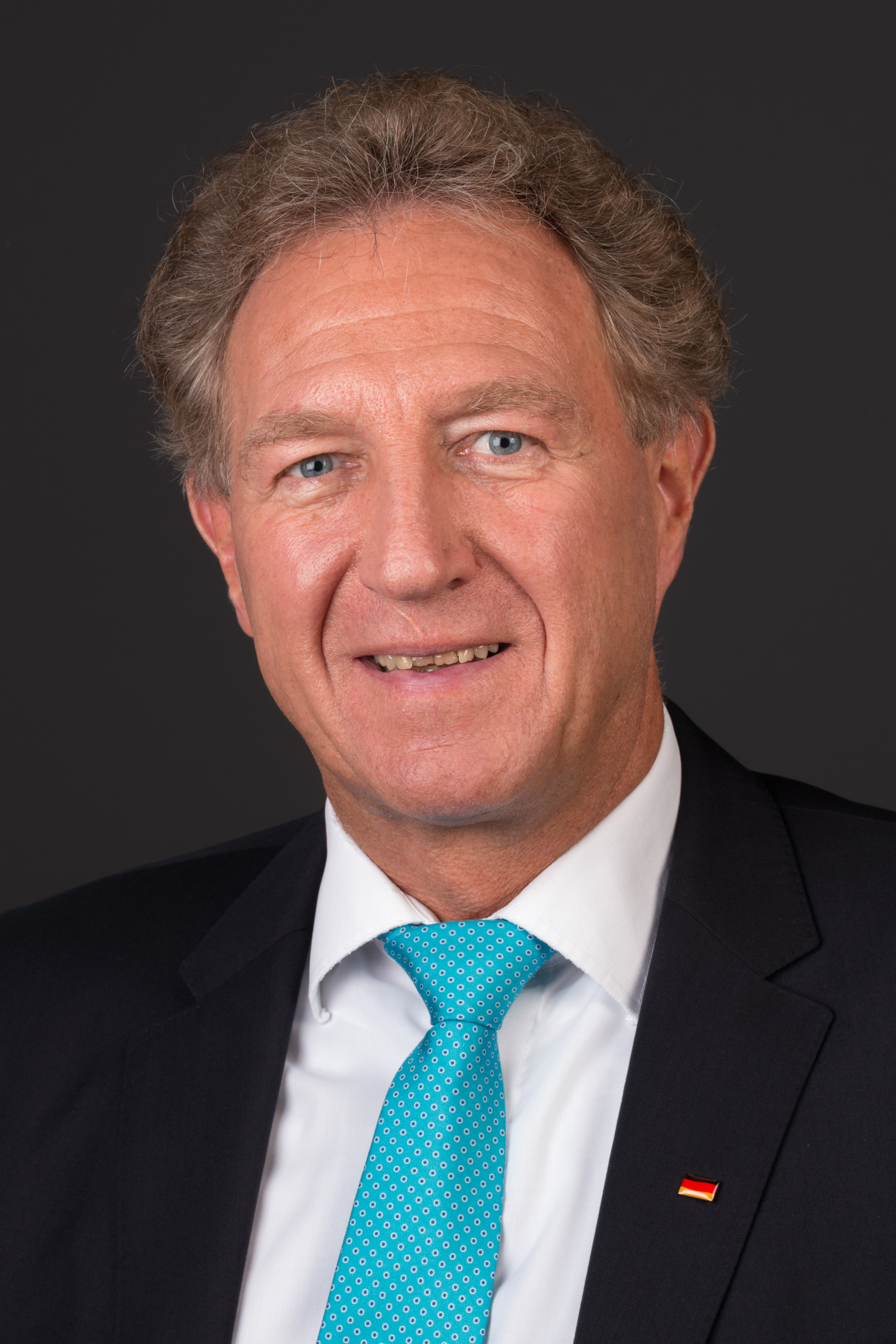
- Barthle in 2014

Member of the Bundestag; for Backnang – Schwäbisch Gmünd
- In office 26 October 1998 – 26 October 2021
- Preceded by: Dieter Schulte
- Succeeded by: Ingeborg Gräßle

Personal details
- Born: 1 February 1953 (age 73) Schwäbisch Gmünd, Baden-Württemberg, West Germany (now Germany)
- Party: Christian Democratic Union
- Children: 2
- Education: University of Tübingen

Norbert Barthle (born 1 February 1952) is a German politician of the Christian Democratic (CDU) who served as a member of the Bundestag from 1998 until 2021, representing Backnang – Schwäbisch Gmünd.

== Professional career ==
Between 1992 and 1998, Barthle worked as press spokesperson at the State Ministry for Education, Youth and Sports of Baden-Württemberg, under the leadership of successive ministers Marianne Schultz-Hector and Annette Schavan.

== Political career ==
Barthle first became a member of the German Bundestag in the 1998 national elections. He served on the Budget Committee and its Sub-Committee on the European Union from 2002 until 2015. In addition, he was a member of the Audit Committee from 2002 until 2005. Between 2013 and 2015, he was a member of the so-called Confidential Committee (Vertrauensgremium) of the Budget Committee, which provides budgetary supervision for Germany's three intelligence services, BND, BfV and MAD.

Within his CDU/CSU parliamentary group, Barthle served as spokesperson on budgetary affairs between 2009 and 2015. He is also the deputy chairman of the Bundestag group of CDU parliamentarians from Baden-Württemberg, one of the largest delegations within the CDU/CSU parliamentary group.

In the negotiations to form a Grand Coalition of the Christian Democrats (CDU together with the Bavarian CSU) and the Social Democrats (SPD) following the 2013 federal elections, Barthle was part of the CDU/CSU delegation in the working group on financial policies and the national budget, led by Wolfgang Schäuble and Olaf Scholz.

In July 2014, Barthle was part of Chancellor Angela Merkel's delegation on a state visit to China.

From late 2015 until 2018, Barthle served as Parliamentary State Secretary at the Federal Ministry of Transport and Digital Infrastructure (BMVI) under minister Alexander Dobrindt, in the third cabinet of Chancellor Angela Merkel. He succeeded Katherina Reiche. As Parliamentary Secretary, he oversaw the ministry's budget and its activities on aviation policy.

With the formation of the fourth Grand Coalition under Merkel in 2018, it was announced that Barthle would move to the position of Parliamentary State Secretary at the Federal Ministry for Economic Cooperation and Development under Minister Gerd Müller. In this capacity, he also serves as Chancellor Angela Merkel's Personal Envoy to the German-Greek Assembly (DGV).

In June 2020, Barthle announced that he would not stand in the 2021 federal elections but instead resign from active politics by the end of the parliamentary term.

== Other activities ==
=== International organizations ===
- Asian Development Bank (ADB), Ex-Officio Member of the Board of Governors (2018–2021)
- Inter-American Investment Corporation (IIC), Ex-Officio Member of the Board of Governors (2018–2021)
- Global Partnership for Effective Development Co-operation, Co-chair (2018–2019)

=== Corporate boards ===
- German Investment Corporation (DEG), Ex-Officio Chairman of the supervisory board (2018–2021)
- Kreissparkasse Ostalb, Member of the supervisory board (since 2009)
- Deutsche Flugsicherung (DFS), Ex-Officio Chairman of the advisory board (2015–2018)
- KfW, Member of the Board of Supervisory Directors (2011–2015)

=== Non-profit organizations ===
- Deutsche Welle, Member of the Broadcasting Council (2018–2021)
- Aviation Initiative for Renewable Energy in Germany (AIREG), Member of the Advisory Board
- International Federation of Snowsport Instructors (IFSI), President
- SG Sonnenhof Großaspach, Member of the Supervisory Board
- Kuratorium Sport & Natur, deputy chairman of the Board (until 2015)
- Freiburger Kreis, Member of the advisory board (1999–2003)

== Political positions ==
During his time on the Budget Committee, Barthle was a proponent of the Merkel government's policy to refrain from any net new borrowing and instead focus all efforts on achieving a structurally balanced national budget.

Ahead of the 2021 national elections, Barthle endorsed Markus Söder as the Christian Democrats' joint candidate to succeed Chancellor Angela Merkel.

== Personal life ==
Barthle is married and has two sons. The family lives in Schwäbisch Gmünd's Lindach district.

== See also ==
- List of German Christian Democratic Union politicians
