= Ruben Rupp =

German politician (born 1990)

Member of the Landtag of Baden-Württemberg
- Incumbent
- Assumed office 11 May 2021

Personal details
- Born: 28 May 1990 (age 36) Mutlangen
- Party: AfD (since 2014)
- Other political affiliations: CDU (2010–2012)

Ruben Rupp (born 28 May 1990 in Mutlangen) is a German politician serving as a member of the Landtag of Baden-Württemberg since 2021. In the 2025 federal election, he was elected as a member of the Bundestag.
