= Mutlangen =

- Municipality
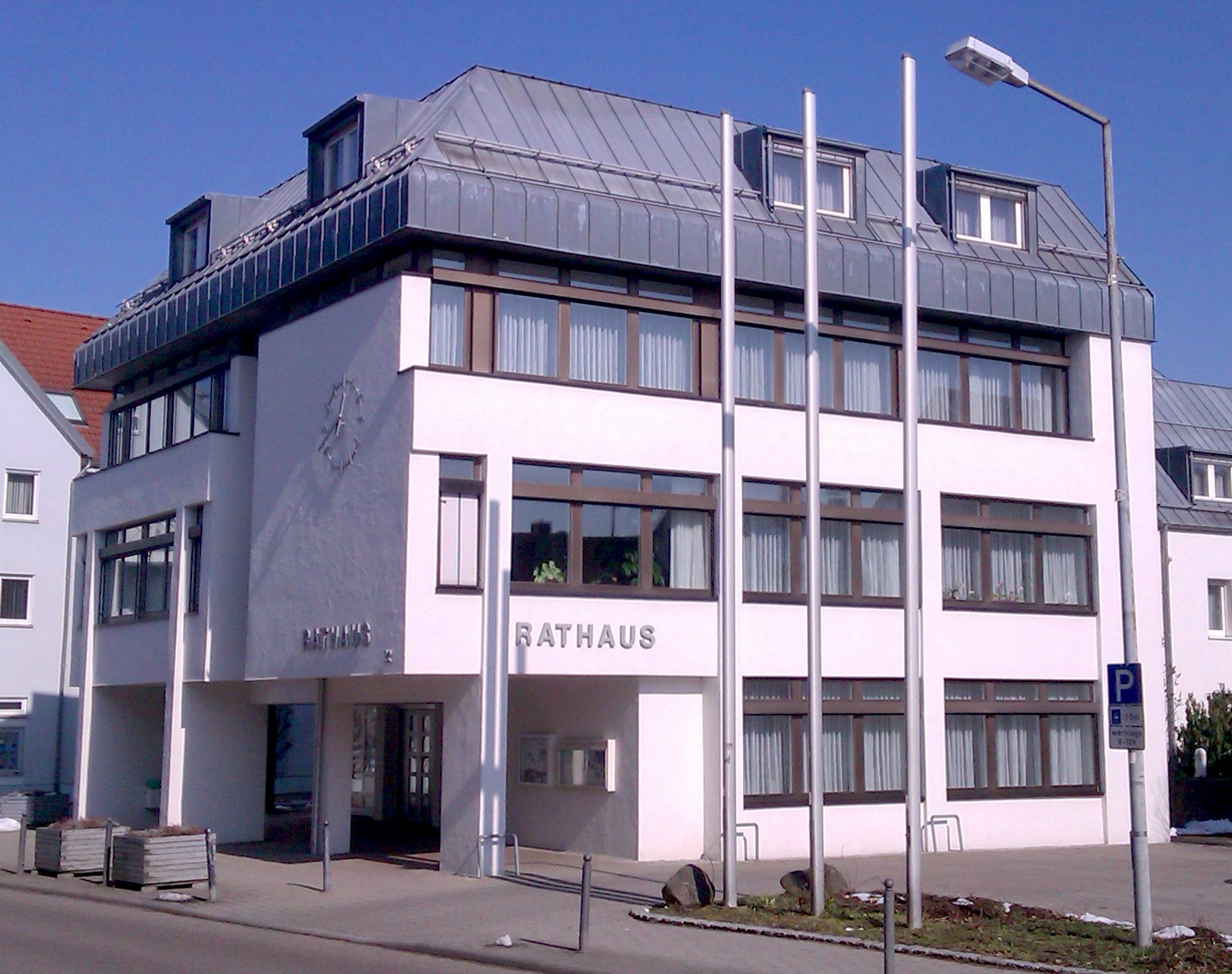
- Town hall

- Coat of arms

- Location of Mutlangen within Ostalbkreis district
- Interactive map of Mutlangen
- Location within Germany Location within Baden-Württemberg
- Coordinates: 48°49′22″N 09°47′41″E
- Country: Germany
- State: Baden-Württemberg
- Admin. region: Stuttgart
- District: Ostalbkreis

Government
  - Mayor (2024–32): Stephanie Eßwein

Area
  - Total: 8.78 km^{2} (3.39 sq mi)
- Elevation: 450 m (1,480 ft)

Population (2025-12-31)
  - Total: 6,724
  - Density: 766/km^{2} (1,980/sq mi)
- Time zone: UTC+01:00 (CET)
  - Summer (DST): UTC+02:00 (CEST)
- Postal codes: 73557
- Dialling codes: 07171
- Vehicle registration: AA
- Website: www.mutlangen.de

Mutlangen is a municipality in the German state of Baden-Württemberg in the Ostalbkreis district and belongs to the Stuttgart Metropolitan Region. As of 31 December 2022, it has 6,886 inhabitants.

== Geography ==
Mutlangen is located between the Welzheim Forest and the Swabian Keuper-Lias Plains on an elevation above the Rems valley. The neighboring communes of Mutlangen are Durlangen in the north, the city of Schwäbisch Gmünd in the east and south as well as Alfdorf in the west. Mutlangen consists of the small town Mutlangen and the hamlet Pfersbach, which belongs to Mutlangen since 1 April 1973.

== History ==
At around 500 AD and later the first verifiable settlement existed (marking of Muotho). However, the site only became more popular at around 1100 to 1200 AD. The manorial systems alternated in a fast pace: Hohenstaufen, Weinsberg and Rechberg. After some time monasteries and families from the nearby Gmünd area were its landlords. The name Mutlangen was first mentioned in 1293 in the scriptures of the Lorch monastery, which probably was its owner at the time.

In the year 1581, the neighboring town of Schwäbisch Gmünd took Mutlangen as property. In the course of the secularization circa 1800, Schwäbisch Gmünd lost its sovereignty and was assigned to the newly established Kingdom of Württemberg. After World War II Mutlangen had around 1,200 inhabitants and exhibited a mostly agricultural labour structure. In addition, in the aftermath of the war numerous refugees and expellees were received. The following decades were characterised by a change to a more industrialised town with newly established enterprises and an increasing population.

The Mutlanger Heide, a heathland nearby, was the site of a US military base for Pershing II missiles, which were assigned to the 56th Field Artillery Command headquartered in nearby Schwäbisch Gmünd. The Pressehütte Mutlangen has since then been a site of peace and antinuclear activism. The missiles were dismantled following the Intermediate-Range Nuclear Forces Treaty in 1990; the base has been almost completely demolished and now is a residential zone. Two remaining blast shelters and a historical path still bear evidence of this part of Mutlangen's history.

== Demographics ==
Population development:

Year	Inhabitants
1990	5,200
2001	5,966
2011	6,522
2021	6,799

== Politics ==
=== Town council and mayor ===
On 13 March 2016, Stephanie Eßwein was elected as the new mayor with a majority of 77.57% of the votes, thus replacing Peter Seyfried, who served for about 30 years as mayor. The town council was last elected on 26 May 2019 and consists of the following parties: Independent voters list (35.8%, 7 seats), Grüne (23.9%, 4 seats), SPD (23.0%, 4 seats) and CDU (17.3%, 3 seats).

=== Coat of arms ===
The coat of arms was awarded to Mutlangen on 1 February 1954 by the government of Baden-Württemberg. Within the red area lays a silver cross, which accommodates the shape of the town's Saint Georg church. The street crossing with the church depicts the accessibility by means of transport, while the colours are a reminder of the affiliation to the former imperial city of Schwäbisch Gmünd.

=== Town twinnings ===
Since 1964, there has been a partnership agreement with the commune Bouxières-aux-Dames. Furthermore, in 1992, a partnership with the Hungarian town of Vaskút was established.

== Infrastructure ==
=== Transportation ===
Mutlangen is connected to the national road network via the federal highway Bundesstraße 298 (Gaildorf-Schwäbisch Gmünd). The closest national highway is the Bundesautobahn 7 in the east near Aalen. Of further importance for the regional traffic are the Landesstraße L1155 and L1156. The nearest train station is Schwäbisch Gmünd station.

=== Public institutions ===
A larger public hospital with the name Stauferklinikum Schwäbisch Gmünd is located within the boundaries of the town in the south-west.

The "Mutlantis" indoor swimming pool has existed since 1974.

== Education ==
In Mutlangen there are two primary schools, a Werkrealschule and a Realschule, a special school for people with linguistic difficulties and since 2012 the private Catholic Franziskus-Gymnasium. For preschool education the town offers two Kindergarten St. Elisabeth and Don Bosco as well as a daycare named Lämmle for children aged 2 to 3.

== Notable residents ==
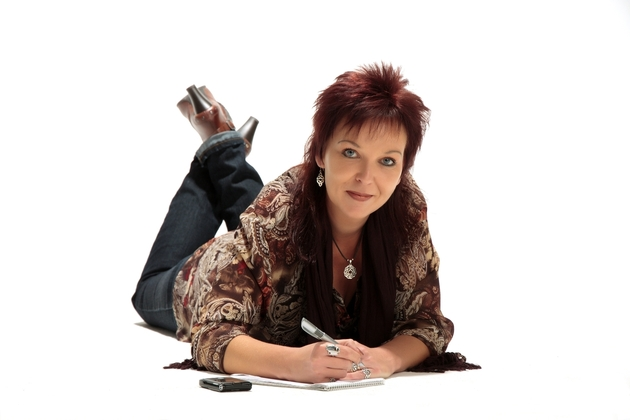
Anja Jantschik, 2014

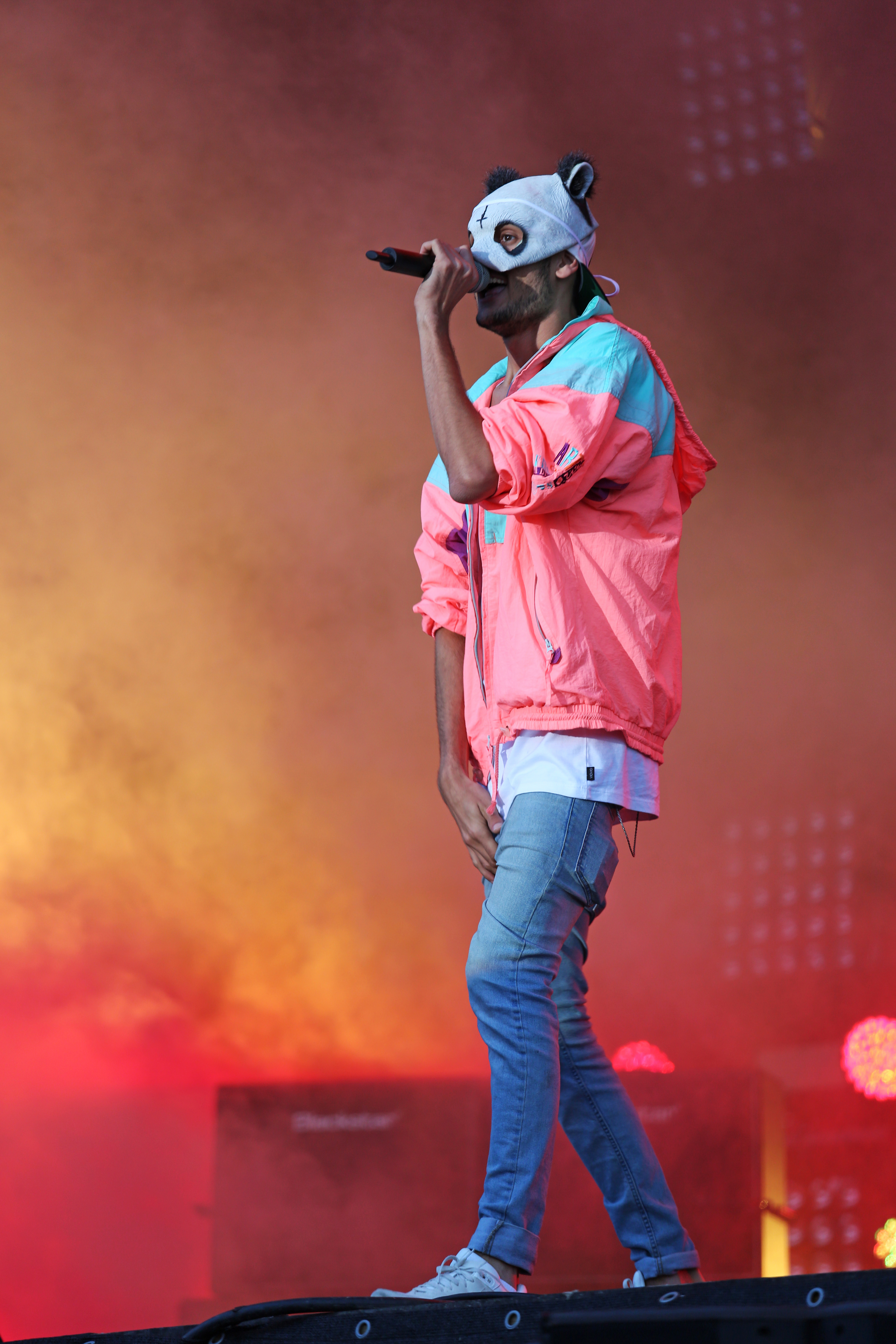
Cro, 2013

- Anton Hinderberger, (DE Wiki) (1886–1963), provost in Rottenburg am Neckar and first honorary citizen of Mutlangen
- Ines Pohl (born 1967), journalist
- Joachim Pfeiffer (born 1967), politician, member of the Bundestag for the CDU
- Anja Jantschik (born 1969), journalist and writer
- Alexander Delle, (DE Wiki) (born 1974), politician for the NPD, former member of the Landtag of Saxony
- Ernst Karl Schassberger, (DE Wiki) (born 1975), cook
- Claus-Dieter Kuhn, (DE Wiki) (born 1978), biochemist
- Timo Bader, (DE Wiki) (born 1983), writer
- Carlo Waibel (born 1990), rapper, stage name Cro
- Ruben Rupp (born 1990), politician

=== Sport ===
- Alexander Zorniger (born 1967), soccer coach
- Anna Bader (born 1983), high diver and cliff diver
- Arthur Abele (born 1986), decathlete
- Florian Schöbinger, (DE Wiki) (born 1986), handball player
- Simon Schempp (born 1988), biathlete
- Lisa Arnholdt, (DE Wiki) (born 1996), volleyball player and beach volleyball player
