= Waldstetten =

- Municipality
- Coat of arms

- Location of Waldstetten within Ostalbkreis district
- Interactive map of Waldstetten
- Location within Germany Location within Baden-Württemberg
- Coordinates: 48°46′00″N 09°49′13″E
- Country: Germany
- State: Baden-Württemberg
- Admin. region: Stuttgart
- District: Ostalbkreis

Government
  - Mayor (since May 1st, 2001): Michael Rembold (Ind.)

Area
  - Total: 20.96 km^{2} (8.09 sq mi)
- Elevation: 387 m (1,270 ft)

Population (2025-12-31)
  - Total: 7,018
  - Density: 334.8/km^{2} (867.2/sq mi)
- Time zone: UTC+01:00 (CET)
  - Summer (DST): UTC+02:00 (CEST)
- Postal codes: 73550
- Dialling codes: 07171
- Vehicle registration: AA, GD
- Website: www.waldstetten.de

Waldstetten (German pronunciation: [valtˈʃtɛtn̩]) is a municipality in the German state of Baden-Württemberg, in Ostalbkreis district.

== Economy and Infrastructure ==
=== Established businesses ===
Industry- Mostly medium and small sized enterprises are located in Waldstetten, including "Leicht Küchen," a kitchen manufacturer, established in 1928, which has approximately 850 employees in Germany.

== Education ==
In Waldsteten is the Franz von Assisi -School", a free Catholic Realschule. There is also the "Unterm Hohenrechberg" school. Additionally, there is a pure primary school in Wißgoldingen. Child care in Waldstetten is provided by four Roman Catholic kindergartens.

== Regular events ==
The Albmarathon, a 50-kilometer (30 mile) ultramarathon runs regularly through the municipality.

== Notable people ==
- Bernhard Rieger (1922–2013), a Catholic theologian and Auxiliary Bishop of the Diocese of Rottenburg-Stuttgart

== Other personalities ==
- Michael Brenner (born 1960), jurist, professor of German and European Constitutional and Administrative Law at the University of Jena, lives in Waldstetten.
- Simon Baumgarten (born 1985), handball player, grew up in Wißgoldingen and attended the Realschule Waldstetten.
- Dominik Kaiser (born 1988), football player, played in his youth for TSGV Waldstetten.
- Carina Vogt (born 1992), German ski jumper and Olympic champion, lives in Waldstetten.
