= Bartholomä =

- Municipality
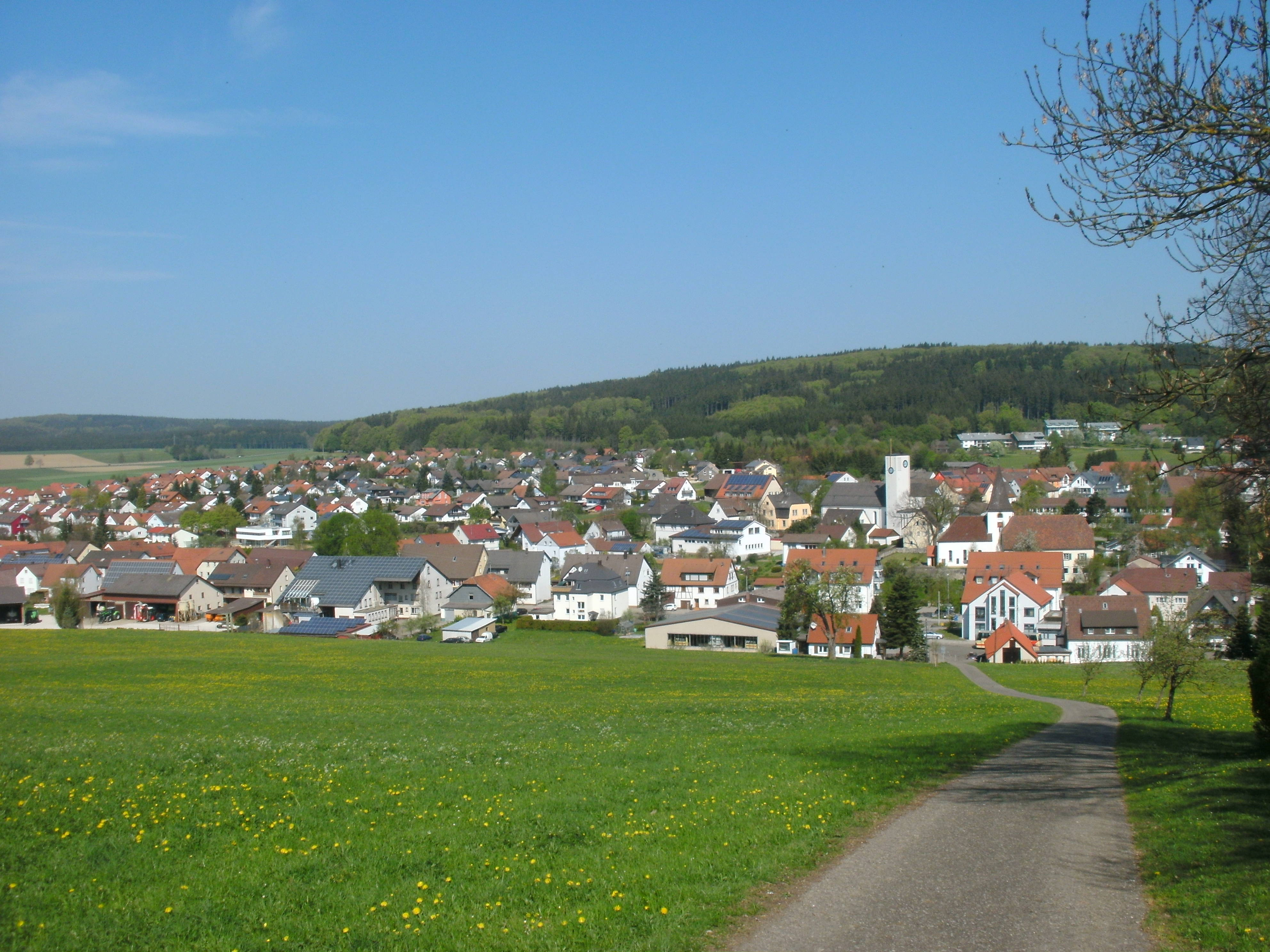
- Bartholomä

- Coat of arms

- Location of Bartholomä within Ostalbkreis district
- Interactive map of Bartholomä
- Location within Germany Location within Baden-Württemberg
- Coordinates: 48°45′13″N 09°59′15″E
- Country: Germany
- State: Baden-Württemberg
- Admin. region: Stuttgart
- District: Ostalbkreis

Government
  - Mayor (2021–29): Thomas Kuhn

Area
  - Total: 20.75 km^{2} (8.01 sq mi)
- Elevation: 641 m (2,103 ft)

Population (2025-12-31)
  - Total: 2,043
  - Density: 98.46/km^{2} (255.0/sq mi)
- Time zone: UTC+01:00 (CET)
  - Summer (DST): UTC+02:00 (CEST)
- Postal codes: 73566
- Dialling codes: 07173
- Vehicle registration: AA
- Website: www.bartholomae.de

Bartholomä is a municipality in the German state of Baden-Württemberg, in Ostalbkreis district.

Bartholomä is mainly a commuter town in the historical region of Swabia, that straddles the border between Baden-Württemberg and Bavaria. The language spoken in Bartholomä is the Swabian dialect.

The businesses in Bartholomä are mainly German staples: a couple of bakeries and butcher shops, a local bar and grill called Zum Schwarzen Adler (the local resource for traditional German food) and its sister establishment, a medieval-themed venue for wedding banquets and such called Braighausen. There is also a complex of houses on the outskirts of town collectively called Amalienhof.

Bartholomä is a 35-minute drive from Neresheim, home of the Neresheim Abbey.

The town is first mentioned in 1365 as Laubenhart but changes its name in the 1500s after Bartholomew the Apostle.
