= Gschwend, Baden-Württemberg =

Gschwend
- Municipality
- Coat of arms

- Location of Gschwend within Ostalbkreis district
- Interactive map of Gschwend
- Location within Germany Location within Baden-Württemberg
- Coordinates: 48°56′03″N 09°44′36″E
- Country: Germany
- State: Baden-Württemberg
- Admin. region: Stuttgart
- District: Ostalbkreis

Government
  - Mayor (2024–32): Jochen Werner Ziehr

Area
  - Total: 54.52 km^{2} (21.05 sq mi)
- Elevation: 484 m (1,588 ft)

Population (2025-12-31)
  - Total: 4,563
  - Density: 83.69/km^{2} (216.8/sq mi)
- Time zone: UTC+01:00 (CET)
  - Summer (DST): UTC+02:00 (CEST)
- Postal codes: 74417
- Dialling codes: 07972
- Vehicle registration: AA
- Website: www.gschwend.de

Gschwend (German pronunciation: [kʃvɛnt]) is a town in the German state of Baden-Württemberg, in Ostalbkreis district.

== Geography ==
=== Geographical Location ===
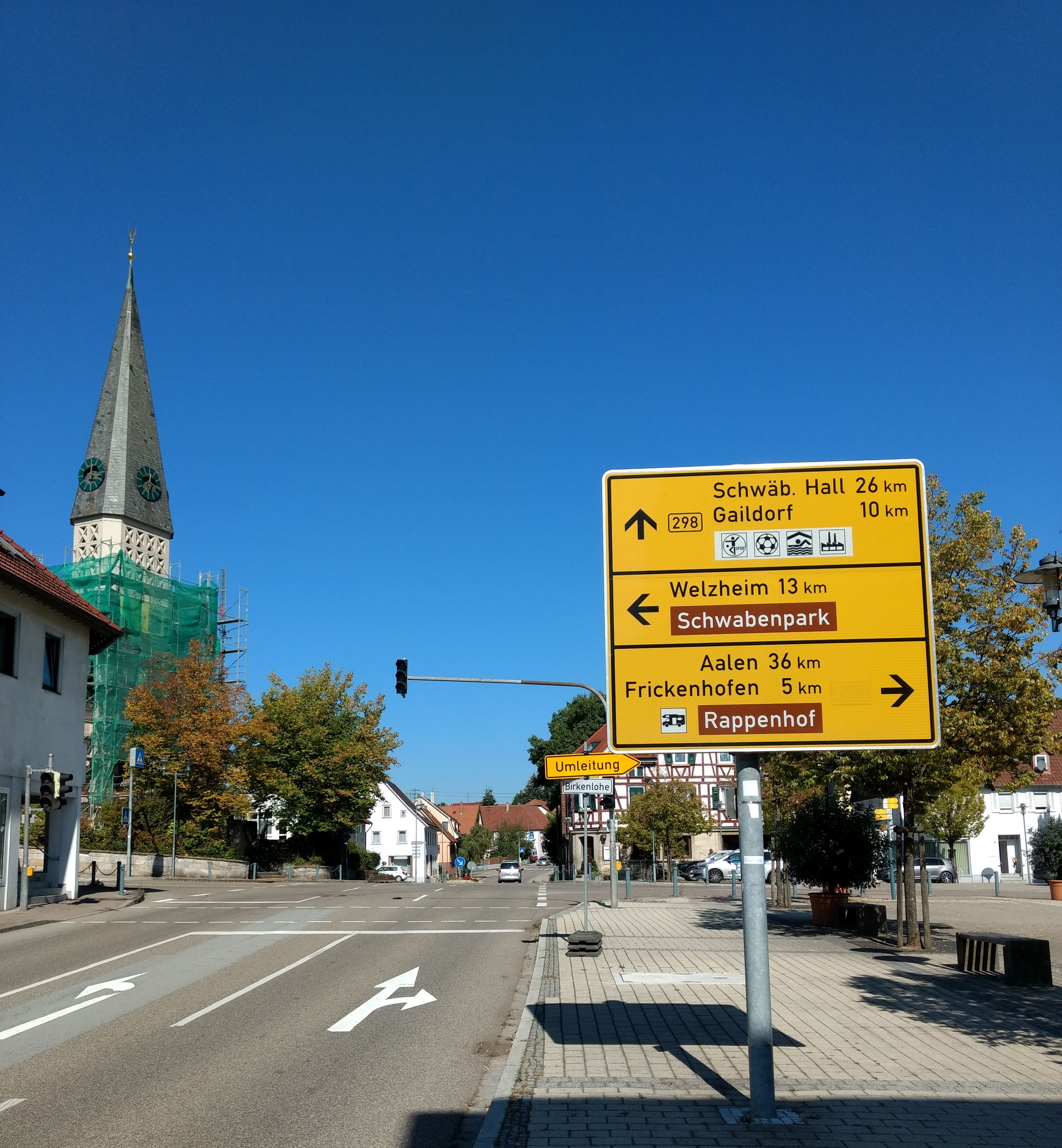
Village center of the main town Gschwend

Gschwend has a share in the three natural regions Eastern Swabian Foothills (Östliches Albvorland), Schurwald and Welzheimer Wald, as well as the Swabian-Franconian Mountain Forests (Schwäbisch-Fränkische Waldberge), all of which belong to the Swabian Keuper-Lias Lands. The municipality lies between the Welzheimer Wald and Frickenhofer Höhe in the Swabian-Franconian Forest Nature Park, on the "Gschwender" Rot, a left tributary of the Lein river.

=== Neighboring Municipalities ===
The municipality borders Fichtenberg to the northwest, the town of Gaildorf to the north, Sulzbach-Laufen to the east, all in the Schwäbisch Hall district; Eschach to the southeast, Ruppertshofen to the south and Spraitbach to the southwest, both in the Ostalbkreis district. To the southwest Gschwend borders Alfdorf, and to the west Kaisersbach and Murrhardt, all in the Rems-Murr district.

=== Municipal Subdivisions ===
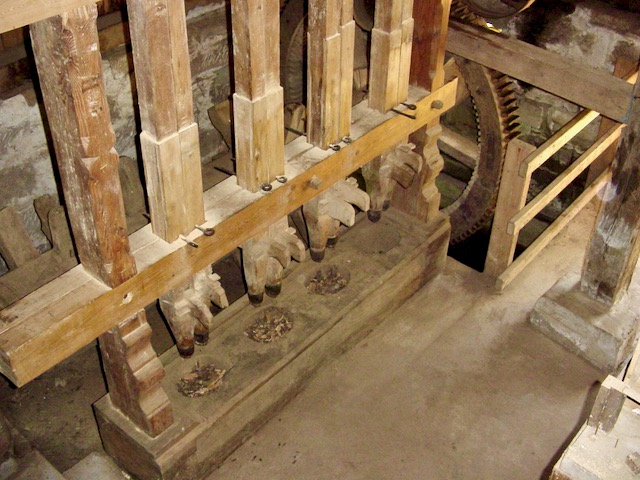
Historical oil mill stamping works in the Brandhöfer mill near Gschwend

The municipality of Gschwend, with the formerly independent municipalities of Altersberg and Frickenhofen, consists of 85 villages, hamlets, farms and houses.

To the former municipality of Altersberg belong:

- The village of Horlachen (seat of the former municipal administration of Altersberg);
- The hamlets of Altersberg, Brandhof, Eichenkirnberg, Hagkling, Hundsberg, Lämmershof, Pritschenhof, Sturmhof, Vorderes Breitenfeld and Wasserhof;
- The farms Felgenhof, Gläserhof, Haghöfle, Haghof, Hengstberg, Hinteres Breitenfeld, Hugenbeckenreute, Krämersberg, Neumühle, Pfeiferhof, Schierhof, Seehöfle and Ziegelhütte
- As well as the deserted villages of Alten-Gleyssern, Gauchs- or Jauchshausen, Krebenhaus (Krämershof), Talheim and Hundsberger sawmill.

To the former municipality of Frickenhofen belong:

- The village of Frickenhofen;
- The hamlets of Dietenhof, Hohenreusch, Joosenhof, Lindenreute (Lindenhöfle), Linsenhof, Metzlenshof, Mittelbronn (first mentioned in 1322), Ottenried, Rotenhar, Spittelhof, Weiler, Wildenhöfle and Wimberg;
- The farms Kellershof, Schöllhof, Steinhöfle, Steinreute and the houses Brechtenhalden, Bruckenhaus, Hohenohl, Joosenhofer sawmill, Käshöfle, Rappenbühl, Rappenhof and Wolfsmühle
- As well as the deserted villages of Erkershofen, Kleiner Erkertshof, Gerbertshofen, Engertsweiler (?), Hagenseesägmühle, Joosenhofer sawmill, Käshofer sawmill and Scherach.

To the municipality of Gschwend before the municipal reform of the 1970s belong:

- The village of Gschwend;
- The hamlets of Birkhof, Buchhaus, Dinglesmad, Hasenhöfle, Hetzenhof, Hirschbach, Hohenreut, Honkling (reassigned from Gaildorf to Gschwend on April 1, 1972), Humbach, Humberg, Mühläckerle, Nardenheim, Schlechtbach (documented in 1395), Schmidbügel, Seelach, Waldhaus and Wildgarten (reassigned from Gaildorf to Gschwend on April 1, 1972);
- The farms Hetschenhof, Hollenhöfle, Hollenhof, Marzellenhof, Oppenland and Unterer Hugenhof and the houses Ernst, Gschwender mill, Haldenhäusle, Oberer Hugenhof, Reißenhöfle, Roßsumpf, Schlechtbacher sawmill, Steinenforst and Straßenhaus
- As well as the deserted villages of "Badhaus", Gestösseln or Stösseln, Kirchberg, Lettenhäusle, Mühlrain, Rauhengehren, Salinhütte am Badsee, Stein bei Steinenforst, Tauberweiler, Tiergarten and Wegstetten.

== History ==
=== Until the 18th Century ===
Frickenhofen, first mentioned in a document in 1293, is the oldest documented locality in the municipality. However, it is assumed that the settlement of Gschwend has existed since the middle of the 12th century. Not much later, the forest around Gschwend was cleared. A special type of clearing was called "Schwenden", which gave Gschwend its name. In this process, the bark of the trees was peeled off, causing them to wither and then either die or be easily ignited and burnt. The flame in the Gschwend coat of arms refers to this burning.

Initially Gschwend was a rather insignificant settlement, but developed into a rural trade center due to its favorable location at the intersection of the roads from Schwäbisch Hall via Gaildorf to Gmünd (the Salt Road from Hall to the south, today's Federal Highway 298) and from Welzheim to Aalen (Cannstatter Road). In the 16th century, the court in Seelach was relocated to Gschwend. There were large cattle markets and annual fairs have been held since 1760. In 1857, a village fire occurred in Gschwend, destroying dozens of buildings.

=== Administrative History ===
Since 1374, Gschwend belonged to the Amt (district) of Gaildorf under the Schenken of Limpurg. In 1806, Gschwend fell to the Kingdom of Württemberg. With the implementation of the new administrative structure, the present-day municipal area of Gschwend was assigned to the Oberamt (regional district) of Gaildorf. During the district reform in Nazi-era Württemberg, Gschwend became part of Backnang district in 1938. In 1945, the municipal area became part of the American occupation zone and thus belonged to the newly founded state of Württemberg-Baden, which merged into the present state of Baden-Württemberg in 1952.

=== Incorporations and District Reform 1971 to 1973 ===
On 1 August 1971, the previously independent municipality of Frickenhofen was incorporated into Gschwend, followed by the incorporation of Altersberg on 1 January 1972. Honkling and Wildgarten were reassigned from Unterrot to Gschwend on 1 April 1972. When Backnang district was dissolved in the district reform of 1973, the municipality of Gschwend became part of the Ostalbkreis district, while the rest of the former Limpurg lands fell to the neighboring Schwäbisch Hall district.

== Religions ==
Since the Reformation, Gschwend has been predominantly Protestant. In addition to four Protestant congregations, there is also a Roman Catholic and a New Apostolic congregation.

== Politics ==
=== Mayor ===
The mayor of the municipality has been Christoph Hald (CDU) since 2016. He succeeded Rosalinde Kottmann, who was the first woman elected to this office in the Ostalbkreis district when she was elected in 2000. In the mayoral election on 14 April 2024, Jochen Ziehr prevailed with 55.2% of the votes against incumbent Hald, who received 44.6% of the votes. Ziehr will assume office on 15 July 2024.

=== Coat of Arms ===
Coat of arms of Gschwend

In gold a red flame with three tongues, accompanied in chief dexter and base sinister by a green fir tree each.

As a canting arms, the coat of arms refers to the place name. "Gschwendeter" means "cleared by burning".

The municipal flag is red-yellow.

Around 1820, the Schultheißenamt (municipal office) used a seal showing a crab on a high oval shield. The meaning of this seal image is not recorded, and the seal later fell into oblivion. In 1926, the Archive Directorate in Stuttgart proposed a burning branch as a canting arms. The Schultheißenamt then adopted the present coat of arms.

On 26 May 1956, the municipality was granted its current coat of arms and flag by the Interior Ministry of Baden-Württemberg.

Coats of Arms of the Districts

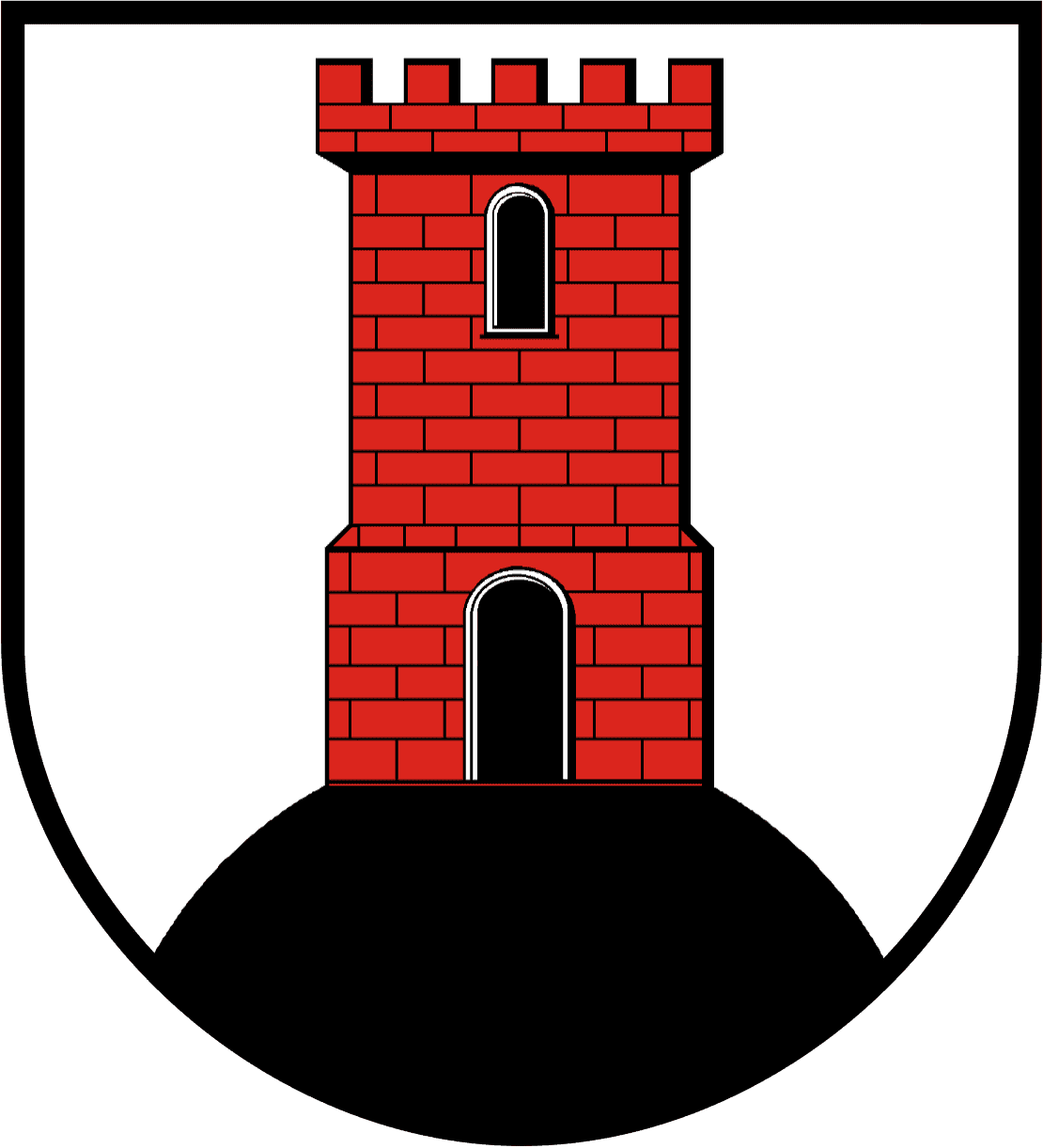
Altersberg

Frickenhofen

== Sights ==
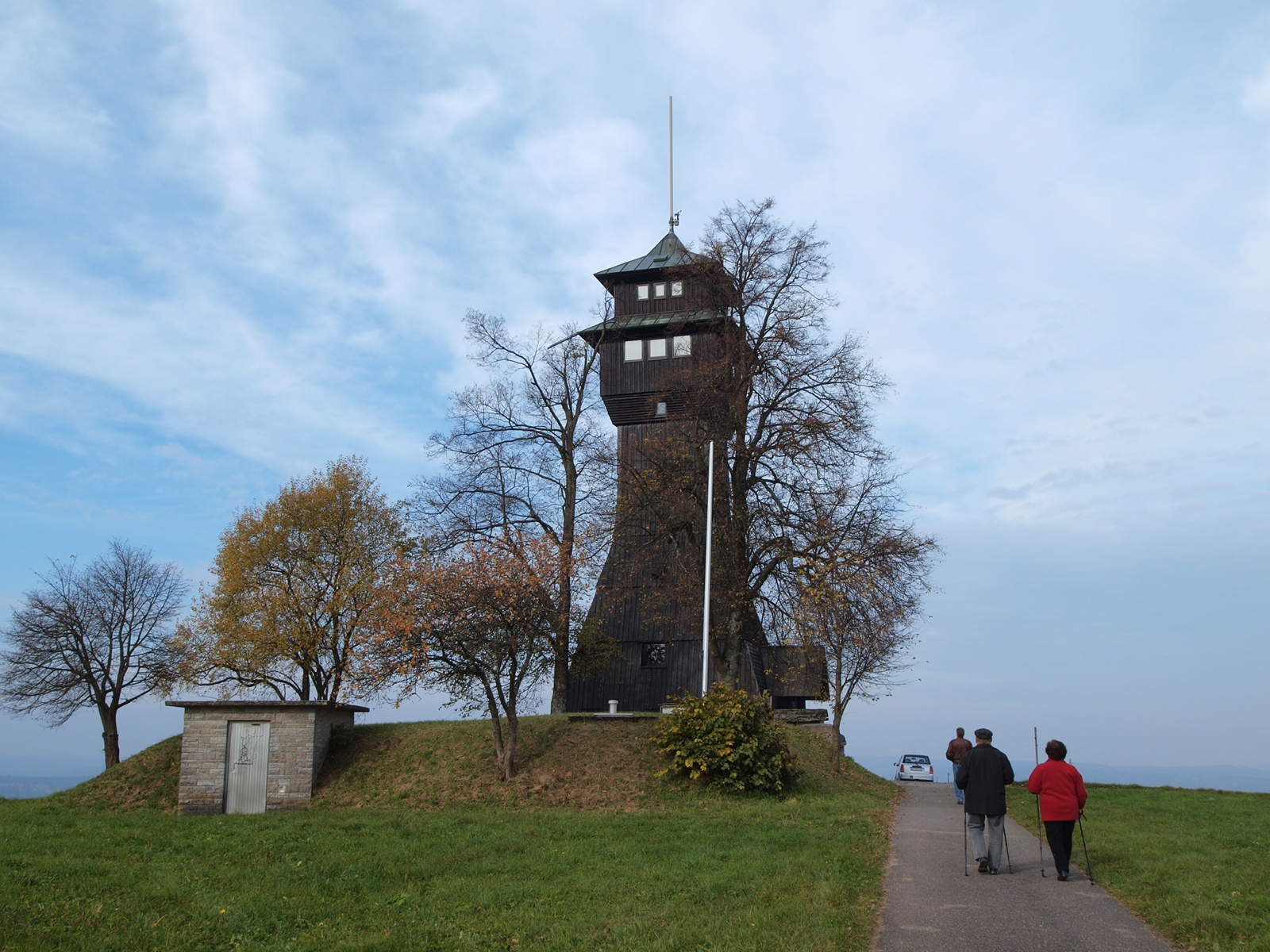
Hagberg Tower near Gschwend

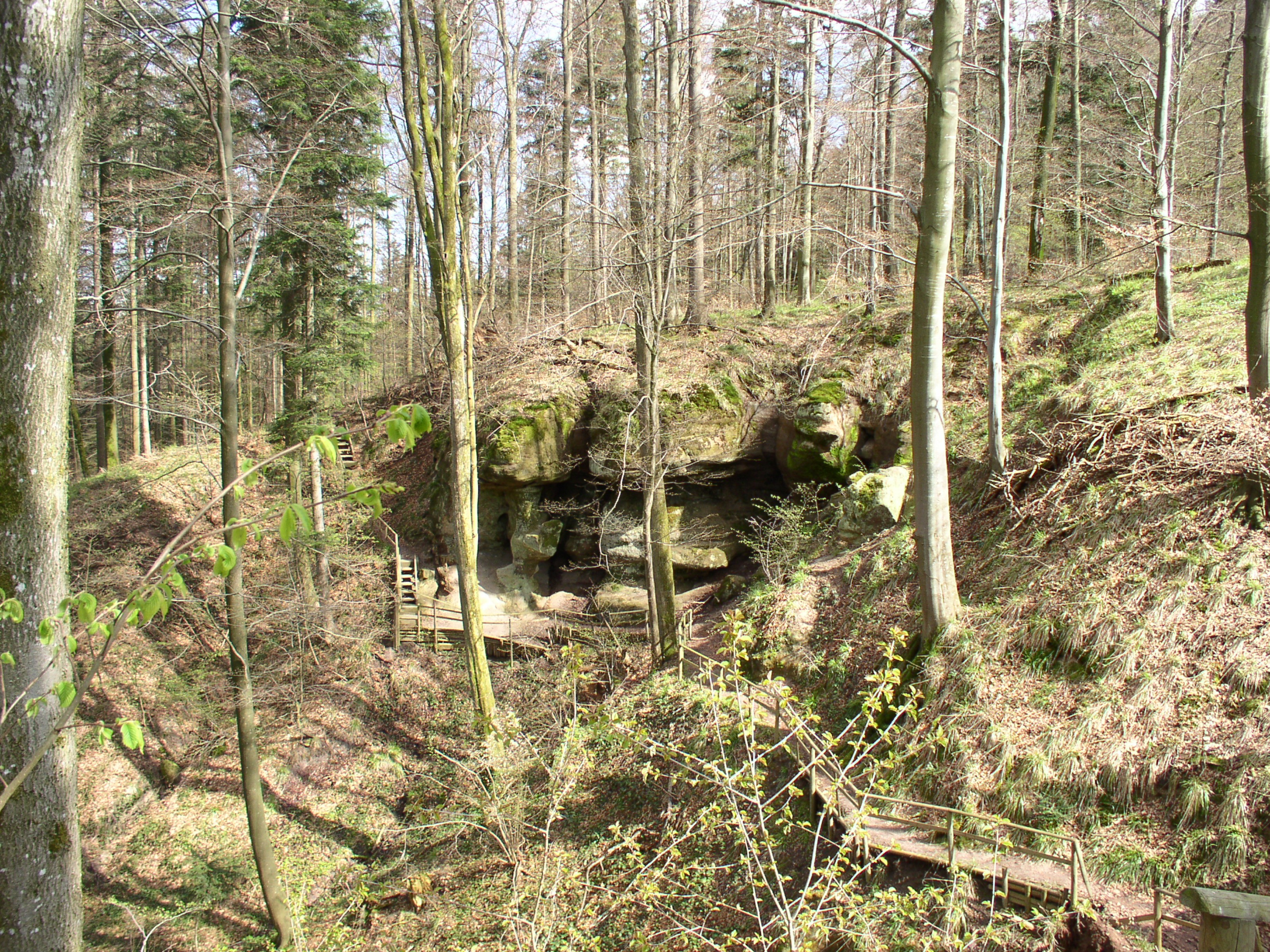
Devil's Pulpit on the north side of Hohe Tannen near Rotenhar

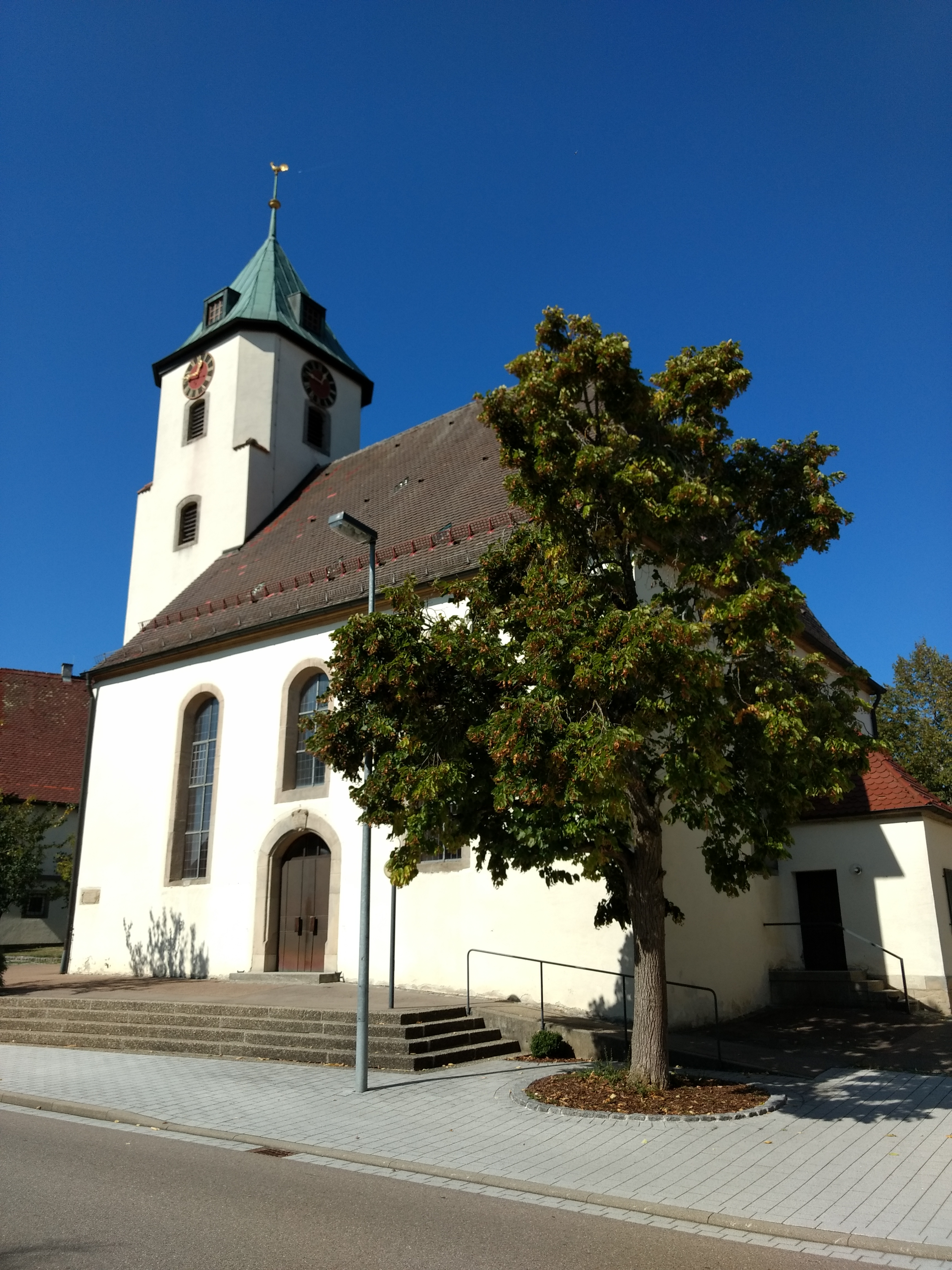
Church in Frickenhofen

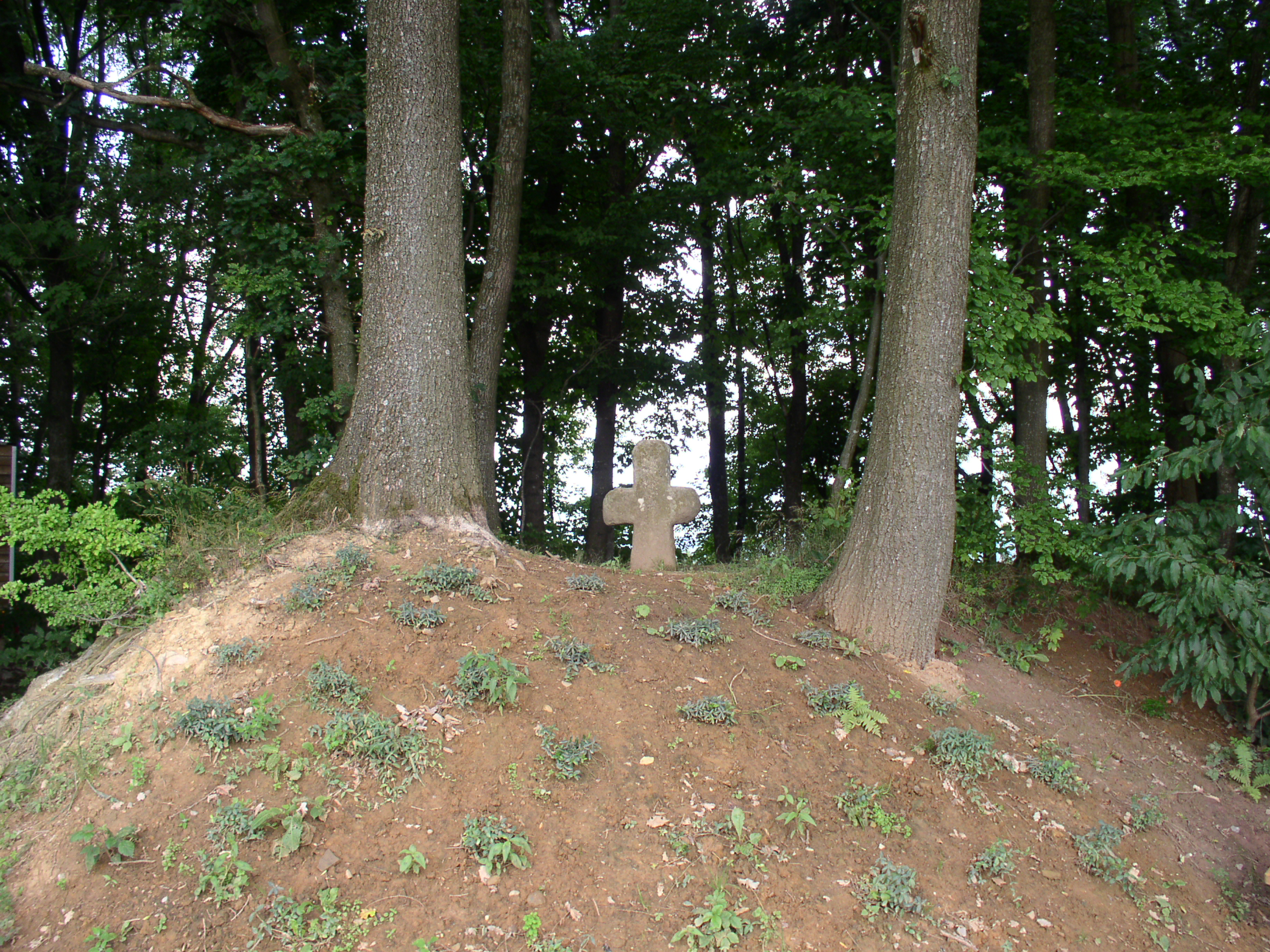
Atonement Cross near Frickenhofen

Gschwend lies along the Idyllische Straße, which passes by many sights. The forest experience trail weiterweg is located on the road from Rotenhar to Schönberg. It combines an art trail and a contemplative path with ten stations.

=== Museums ===
The local heritage museum is located in the former school and town hall building in Horlachen.

=== Buildings ===
- St. Andreas Church in Schlechtbach. The Gothic church, built in 1447, is probably the oldest building in the municipal area. The high altar with a Madonna statue from 1430 is a special gem.
- Hagberg Tower. The observation tower on Hagberg, at 585.2 m the highest mountain in the Welzheim Forest, is a landmark of Gschwend and orientation point in the wider area. It is open from the third Sunday in April until the end of October on all Sundays and public holidays.

Protestant Parish Church (formerly St. Nikolaus) in Frickenhofen. Built in 1743 in place of a Gothic predecessor church that burned down in 1634. Memorial plaque to Pastor Wolfgang Kirschenbeisser next to the church entrance.

- Stone Cross (Atonement Cross) in Frickenhofen. This is located at the end of Schmiedstraße (on the Frickenhofer Höhe hiking trail). According to legend, a person was slain here in a dispute. To avoid endless family feuds (blood revenge), an atonement agreement was reached with the help of the authorities. The stone cross was erected as a memorial near the crime scene on a frequently used path. It probably dates from the 15th or 16th century and is likely the oldest cultural monument in the district of Frickenhofen.

=== Natural Monuments ===
- Devil's Kitchen in Gschwend, on the southern slope of the municipal mountain
- Devil's Pulpit 500 meters east of Rotenhar

== Economy and Infrastructure ==
=== Transport ===
Gschwend is connected to the regional road network via Federal Highway 298 (Gaildorf–Schwäbisch Gmünd).

=== Companies based locally ===
The wood-based panel manufacturer Pfleiderer operated a particleboard plant in Gschwend. After "having been completely on short-time work for 13 months already", it was closed in October 2010.

=== Education ===
Gschwend is home to the Heinrich-Prescher-School, an elementary and secondary modern school with a secondary technical school branch. In the district of Frickenhofen, there is another elementary school based on the Montessori method of education. The private vocational school for circus arts CircArtive is also located in Gschwend. In addition, there are three municipal and three church-run kindergartens.

== Notable people ==
- Philipp Gottlieb Osiander (1803–1876), born in Frickenhofen, Oberamtmann and Member of Landtag
- Friedrich von Schmidt (1825–1891), born in Frickenhofen, architect of many churches and town halls in new-gothic style
- Christian Dietrich (1844–1919), Swabian old-pietist
- Peter Jakob Schober (1897–1983), painter
- Lina Haag (1907–2012) resistance fighter
- Erich Schneider (born 1933), politician (CDU), President of Landtag Baden-Württemberg from 1982 till 1992
- Theodore Frederic Molt (1795–1856), organist and composer in Canada, was born here

== Customs/Traditions ==
=== Harvest Wagon ===
Every year at the beginning of the harvest season, usually on the first weekend of August, a decorated harvest wagon with the first sheaves is pulled by horses in a festive procession of children and accompanied by the ringing of bells to the church in the marketplace. This tradition dates back to 1817. At that time, after the great famine of 1816, it was decided to ceremoniously escort the first harvest wagon to the church.

Gschwend is, along with Essingen, one of the few communities that still maintains this tradition today with great participation from the population.

=== Cattle Market ===
After the great fire of 1857, the people of Gschwend took the opportunity to completely redesign their town center. They leveled a large rectangle at the intersection of the main thoroughfares and created a new, spacious marketplace, as the previous condition was not ideal for the cattle market. The town had already received the "right to two annual markets" in 1760, with a third added in 1776. This was another milestone in the development into today's central community, after being designated as an administrative center in the 16th century. The markets made Gschwend an agricultural center and promoted trade and commerce. They were well-known and well-attended far and wide. Between 500 and 1,000 cattle were driven there at the time, and in February 1887 there were even 1,425. Although the Gschwend markets can no longer boast such numbers in the course of motorization and technologization, they are still among the most important in northern Württemberg.
