= Iggingen =

- Municipality
- Coat of arms

- Location of Iggingen within Ostalbkreis district
- Interactive map of Iggingen
- Location within Germany Location within Baden-Württemberg
- Coordinates: 48°49′59″N 09°52′40″E
- Country: Germany
- State: Baden-Württemberg
- Admin. region: Stuttgart
- District: Ostalbkreis

Government
  - Mayor (2024–32): Tobias Feldmeyer

Area
  - Total: 11.42 km^{2} (4.41 sq mi)
- Elevation: 464 m (1,522 ft)

Population (2025-12-31)
  - Total: 2,629
  - Density: 230.2/km^{2} (596.2/sq mi)
- Time zone: UTC+01:00 (CET)
  - Summer (DST): UTC+02:00 (CEST)
- Postal codes: 73574
- Dialling codes: 07175
- Vehicle registration: AA
- Website: www.iggingen.de

Iggingen (German pronunciation: [ˈɪɡɪŋən]) is a municipality in the German state of Baden-Württemberg, in Ostalbkreis district.

== Population development ==
- 1939: 952
- 1961: 1.412
- 1987: 1.959
- 1997: 2.385
- 2006: 2.586

== Mayor ==
Klemens Stöckle was elected mayor in 1994, he was reelected in 2002, 2010 and 2018. In February 2024 Tobias Feldmeyer was elected mayor.

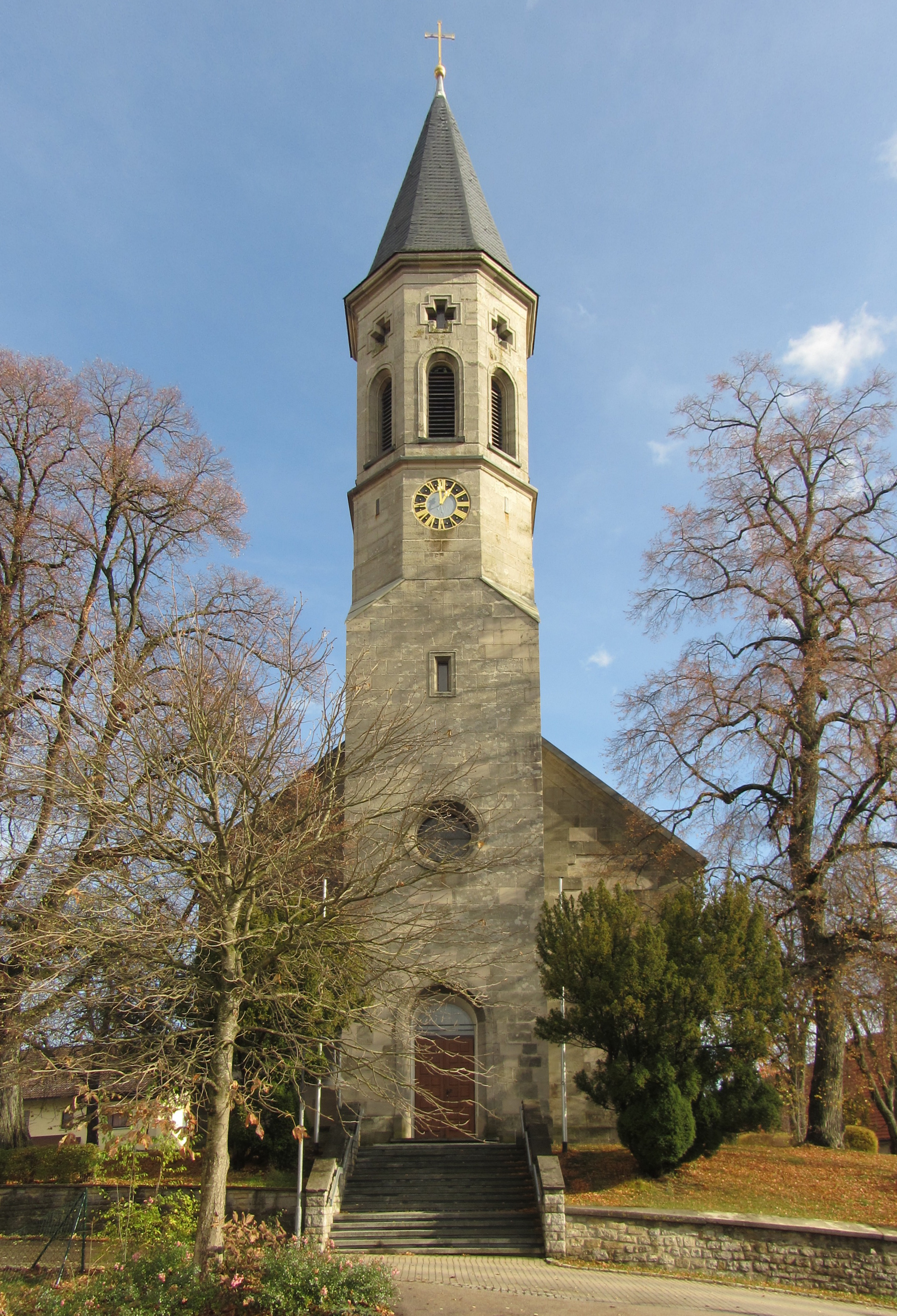
St.-Martinus-Church Iggingen
