= Leinzell =

- Municipality
- Coat of arms

- Location of Leinzell within Ostalbkreis district
- Interactive map of Leinzell
- Location within Germany Location within Baden-Württemberg
- Coordinates: 48°50′58″N 09°52′45″E
- Country: Germany
- State: Baden-Württemberg
- Admin. region: Stuttgart
- District: Ostalbkreis

Government
  - Mayor (2022–30): Marc Schäffler

Area
  - Total: 2.11 km^{2} (0.81 sq mi)
- Elevation: 400 m (1,300 ft)

Population (2025-12-31)
  - Total: 2,013
  - Density: 954/km^{2} (2,470/sq mi)
- Time zone: UTC+01:00 (CET)
  - Summer (DST): UTC+02:00 (CEST)
- Postal codes: 73575
- Dialling codes: 07175
- Vehicle registration: AA
- Website: www.leinzell.de

Leinzell (German: [laɪnˈtsɛl]) is a municipality in the German state of Baden-Württemberg, in Ostalbkreis district.

== Demographics ==
Population development:

Year	Inhabitants
1990	2,311
2001	2,325
2011	2,067
2021	2,061

== Mayors ==
- 1897–1921: Josef Rist
- 1921–1934: August Ohnewald
- 1934–1945: Anton Lang
- 1945–1946: Anton Ströbel
- 1945–1968: Gustav Vogt
- 1968–1974: Klaus Pick
- 1974–2006: Günter Nesper
- 2006–2022: Ralph Leischner
- Since 2022: Marc Schäffler
