= Schechingen =

- Municipality
- Coat of arms

- Location of Schechingen within Ostalbkreis district
- Interactive map of Schechingen
- Location within Germany Location within Baden-Württemberg
- Coordinates: 48°52′24″N 09°55′03″E
- Country: Germany
- State: Baden-Württemberg
- Admin. region: Stuttgart
- District: Ostalbkreis

Government
  - Mayor (2020–28): Stefan Jenninger

Area
  - Total: 11.87 km^{2} (4.58 sq mi)
- Elevation: 478 m (1,568 ft)

Population (2025-12-31)
  - Total: 2,239
  - Density: 188.6/km^{2} (488.5/sq mi)
- Time zone: UTC+01:00 (CET)
  - Summer (DST): UTC+02:00 (CEST)
- Postal codes: 73579
- Dialling codes: 07175
- Vehicle registration: AA
- Website: www.schechingen.de

Schechingen (German pronunciation: [ˈʃɛçɪŋən]) is a municipality in the German state of Baden-Württemberg, in Ostalbkreis district.

== Mayors ==
- -1965: Josef Schäffner
- 1966–1996: Jürgen Schaich
- 1996–2020: Werner Jekel
- since 2020: Stefan Jenninger
