= Obergröningen =

- Municipality
- Coat of arms

- Location of Obergröningen within Ostalbkreis district
- Interactive map of Obergröningen
- Location within Germany Location within Baden-Württemberg
- Coordinates: 48°53′40″N 09°54′33″E
- Country: Germany
- State: Baden-Württemberg
- Admin. region: Stuttgart
- District: Ostalbkreis

Government
  - Mayor (2016–24): Jochen König

Area
  - Total: 5.86 km^{2} (2.26 sq mi)
- Elevation: 500 m (1,600 ft)

Population (2025-12-31)
  - Total: 427
  - Density: 72.9/km^{2} (189/sq mi)
- Time zone: UTC+01:00 (CET)
  - Summer (DST): UTC+02:00 (CEST)
- Postal codes: 73569
- Dialling codes: 07975
- Vehicle registration: AA

Obergröningen is a town in the German state of Baden-Württemberg, in Ostalbkreis district.

== Demographics ==
Population development:

Year	Inhabitants
1990	421
2001	450
2011	463
2021	436
