= Täferrot =

- Municipality
- Coat of arms

- Location of Täferrot within Ostalbkreis district
- Interactive map of Täferrot
- Location within Germany Location within Baden-Württemberg
- Coordinates: 48°50′57″N 09°50′17″E
- Country: Germany
- State: Baden-Württemberg
- Admin. region: Stuttgart
- District: Ostalbkreis

Government
  - Mayor (2019–27): Markus Bareis

Area
  - Total: 12.01 km^{2} (4.64 sq mi)
- Elevation: 425 m (1,394 ft)

Population (2025-12-31)
  - Total: 982
  - Density: 81.8/km^{2} (212/sq mi)
- Time zone: UTC+01:00 (CET)
  - Summer (DST): UTC+02:00 (CEST)
- Postal codes: 73527
- Dialling codes: 07175
- Vehicle registration: AA
- Website: www.taeferrot.de

Täferrot (German: [tɛːfɐˈʁoːt]) is a municipality in the German state of Baden-Württemberg, in Ostalbkreis district. Originally named Rot, it was named Afrenrot (after Saint Afra) in 1298 to distinguish it from other towns with the same name. This became corrupted to Täferrot.

== Mayors ==
- 1999–2015: Jochen Renner
- 2015–2019: Daniel Vogt.
- since 2019: Markus Bareis
