= Spraitbach =

- Municipality
- Coat of arms

- Location of Spraitbach within Ostalbkreis district
- Interactive map of Spraitbach
- Location within Germany Location within Baden-Württemberg
- Coordinates: 48°52′55″N 09°45′56″E
- Country: Germany
- State: Baden-Württemberg
- Admin. region: Stuttgart
- District: Ostalbkreis

Government
  - Mayor (2017–25): Johannes Schurr

Area
  - Total: 12.39 km^{2} (4.78 sq mi)
- Elevation: 539 m (1,768 ft)

Population (2025-12-31)
  - Total: 3,400
  - Density: 270/km^{2} (710/sq mi)
- Time zone: UTC+01:00 (CET)
  - Summer (DST): UTC+02:00 (CEST)
- Postal codes: 73565
- Dialling codes: 07176
- Vehicle registration: AA, GD
- Website: www.spraitbach.de

Spraitbach (German pronunciation: [ˈʃpʁaɪtbax]) is a municipality in the German state of Baden-Württemberg, in Ostalbkreis district.

== History ==
In 1907 a new town hall was built, the name of the mayor (Schultheiß) was Hägele. In 1914 electricity for Spraitbach and Vorderlintal was installed. In 1950 the municipality had 960 inhabitants.

From 1952 to 1966 there was a land consolidation. The census result in 1987 was 2878 inhabitants.

From 1958 to 1994 Walter Zepf was the mayor, his successor was Rolf Siebert. Up until the most recent elections in 2017, Ulrich Baum served as mayor since 2002.
