= Heuchlingen =

- Municipality
- Coat of arms

- Location of Heuchlingen within Ostalbkreis district
- Interactive map of Heuchlingen
- Location within Germany Location within Baden-Württemberg
- Coordinates: 48°51′02″N 09°56′42″E
- Country: Germany
- State: Baden-Württemberg
- Admin. region: Stuttgart
- District: Ostalbkreis

Government
  - Mayor (2018–26): Peter Lang

Area
  - Total: 9.03 km^{2} (3.49 sq mi)
- Elevation: 402 m (1,319 ft)

Population (2025-12-31)
  - Total: 1,855
  - Density: 205/km^{2} (532/sq mi)
- Time zone: UTC+01:00 (CET)
  - Summer (DST): UTC+02:00 (CEST)
- Postal codes: 73572
- Dialling codes: 07174
- Vehicle registration: AA
- Website: www.heuchlingen.de

Heuchlingen (German pronunciation: [ˈhɔʏçlɪŋən]) is a municipality in the German state of Baden-Württemberg, in Ostalbkreis district.

== Population development ==
- 2013: 1786
- 2010: 1860
- 2000: 1816
- 1986: 1553
- 1979: 1405
