= Durlangen =

- Municipality
- Coat of arms

- Location of Durlangen within Ostalbkreis district
- Interactive map of Durlangen
- Location within Germany Location within Baden-Württemberg
- Coordinates: 48°51′31″N 09°47′40″E
- Country: Germany
- State: Baden-Württemberg
- Admin. region: Stuttgart
- District: Ostalbkreis

Government
  - Mayor (2018–26): Dieter Gerstlauer

Area
  - Total: 10.43 km^{2} (4.03 sq mi)
- Elevation: 470 m (1,540 ft)

Population (2025-12-31)
  - Total: 2,711
  - Density: 259.9/km^{2} (673.2/sq mi)
- Time zone: UTC+01:00 (CET)
  - Summer (DST): UTC+02:00 (CEST)
- Postal codes: 73568
- Dialling codes: 07176
- Vehicle registration: AA

Durlangen is a town in the German state of Baden-Württemberg, in Ostalbkreis district.
