= Ruppertshofen, Baden-Württemberg =

Ruppertshofen
- Municipality
- Coat of arms

- Location of Ruppertshofen within Ostalbkreis district
- Interactive map of Ruppertshofen
- Location within Germany Location within Baden-Württemberg
- Coordinates: 48°52′57″N 09°48′55″E
- Country: Germany
- State: Baden-Württemberg
- Admin. region: Stuttgart
- District: Ostalbkreis

Government
  - Mayor (2023–31): Peter Kühnl

Area
  - Total: 14.21 km^{2} (5.49 sq mi)
- Elevation: 510 m (1,670 ft)

Population (2025-12-31)
  - Total: 1,944
  - Density: 136.8/km^{2} (354.3/sq mi)
- Time zone: UTC+01:00 (CET)
  - Summer (DST): UTC+02:00 (CEST)
- Postal codes: 73577
- Dialling codes: 07176
- Vehicle registration: AA
- Website: www.ruppertshofen.de

Ruppertshofen (German pronunciation: [ʁʊpɐtsˈhoːfn̩]) is a municipality in the district of Ostalbkreis in Baden-Württemberg in Germany.
