= Göggingen =

- Municipality
- Coat of arms

- Location of Göggingen within Ostalbkreis district
- Interactive map of Göggingen
- Location within Germany Location within Baden-Württemberg
- Coordinates: 48°51′38″N 09°53′00″E
- Country: Germany
- State: Baden-Württemberg
- Admin. region: Stuttgart
- District: Ostalbkreis

Government
  - Mayor (2021–29): Danny Philipp Kuhl

Area
  - Total: 11.38 km^{2} (4.39 sq mi)
- Elevation: 488 m (1,601 ft)

Population (2025-12-31)
  - Total: 2,558
  - Density: 224.8/km^{2} (582.2/sq mi)
- Time zone: UTC+01:00 (CET)
  - Summer (DST): UTC+02:00 (CEST)
- Postal codes: 73571
- Dialling codes: 07175
- Vehicle registration: AA
- Website: www.gemeinde-goeggingen.de

Göggingen (German pronunciation: [ˈɡœɡɪŋən]) is a municipality in the district of Ostalbkreis in Baden-Württemberg in Germany.
