= Waiblingen (electoral district) =

Federal electoral district of Germany

264 Waiblingen
- Electoral district for the Bundestag
- Waiblingen in 2025
- State: Baden-Württemberg
- Population: 322,400 (2019)
- Electorate: 221,775 (2021)
- Major settlements: Waiblingen; Fellbach; Schorndorf
- Area: 513.3 km^{2}

Current electoral district
- Created: 1949
- Party: CDU
- Member: Christina Stumpp
- Elected: 2021, 2025

Waiblingen is an electoral constituency (German: Wahlkreis) represented in the Bundestag. It elects one member via first-past-the-post voting. Under the current constituency numbering system, it is designated as constituency 264. It is located in central Baden-Württemberg, comprising the southern part of the Rems-Murr-Kreis district.

Waiblingen was created for the inaugural 1949 federal election. Since 2021, it has been represented by Christina Stumpp of the Christian Democratic Union (CDU).

== Geography ==
Waiblingen is located in central Baden-Württemberg. As of the 2021 federal election, it comprises the municipalities of Alfdorf, Berglen, Fellbach, Kaisersbach, Kernen im Remstal, Korb, Leutenbach, Plüderhausen, Remshalden, Rudersberg, Schorndorf, Schwaikheim, Urbach, Waiblingen, Weinstadt, Welzheim, Winnenden, and Winterbach from the Rems-Murr-Kreis district.

== History ==
Waiblingen was created in 1949. In the 1949 election, it was Württemberg-Baden Landesbezirk Württemberg constituency 12 in the numbering system. In the 1953 through 1961 elections, it was number 174. In the 1965 through 1976 elections, it was number 177. In the 1980 through 1998 elections, it was number 168. In the 2002 and 2005 elections, it was number 265. Since the 2009 election, it has been number 264.

Originally, the constituency was coterminous with the Waiblingen district. In the 1976 election, it acquired a configuration very similar to its current borders, but excluding the municipality of Alfdorf. It acquired its current borders in the 1980 election.

Election	No.	Name	Borders
1949	12	Waiblingen	Waiblingen district
1953	174	Waiblingen	Waiblingen district
1957	174	Waiblingen	Waiblingen district
1961	174	Waiblingen	Waiblingen district
1965	178	Waiblingen	Waiblingen district
1969	178	Waiblingen	Waiblingen district
1972	178	Waiblingen	Waiblingen district
1976	178	Waiblingen	Rems-Murr-Kreis district (only Berglen, Fellbach, Kaisersbach, Kernen im Remstal, Korb, Leutenbach, Plüderhausen, Remshalden, Rudersberg, Schorndorf, Schwaikheim, Urbach, Waiblingen, Weinstadt, Welzheim, Winnenden, and Winterbach municipalities)
1980	168	Waiblingen	Rems-Murr-Kreis district (only Alfdorf, Berglen, Fellbach, Kaisersbach, Kernen im Remstal, Korb, Leutenbach, Plüderhausen, Remshalden, Rudersberg, Schorndorf, Schwaikheim, Urbach, Waiblingen, Weinstadt, Welzheim, Winnenden, and Winterbach municipalities)
1983	168	Waiblingen	Rems-Murr-Kreis district (only Alfdorf, Berglen, Fellbach, Kaisersbach, Kernen im Remstal, Korb, Leutenbach, Plüderhausen, Remshalden, Rudersberg, Schorndorf, Schwaikheim, Urbach, Waiblingen, Weinstadt, Welzheim, Winnenden, and Winterbach municipalities)
1987	168	Waiblingen	Rems-Murr-Kreis district (only Alfdorf, Berglen, Fellbach, Kaisersbach, Kernen im Remstal, Korb, Leutenbach, Plüderhausen, Remshalden, Rudersberg, Schorndorf, Schwaikheim, Urbach, Waiblingen, Weinstadt, Welzheim, Winnenden, and Winterbach municipalities)
1990	168	Waiblingen	Rems-Murr-Kreis district (only Alfdorf, Berglen, Fellbach, Kaisersbach, Kernen im Remstal, Korb, Leutenbach, Plüderhausen, Remshalden, Rudersberg, Schorndorf, Schwaikheim, Urbach, Waiblingen, Weinstadt, Welzheim, Winnenden, and Winterbach municipalities)
1994	168	Waiblingen	Rems-Murr-Kreis district (only Alfdorf, Berglen, Fellbach, Kaisersbach, Kernen im Remstal, Korb, Leutenbach, Plüderhausen, Remshalden, Rudersberg, Schorndorf, Schwaikheim, Urbach, Waiblingen, Weinstadt, Welzheim, Winnenden, and Winterbach municipalities)
1998	168	Waiblingen	Rems-Murr-Kreis district (only Alfdorf, Berglen, Fellbach, Kaisersbach, Kernen im Remstal, Korb, Leutenbach, Plüderhausen, Remshalden, Rudersberg, Schorndorf, Schwaikheim, Urbach, Waiblingen, Weinstadt, Welzheim, Winnenden, and Winterbach municipalities)
2002	265	Waiblingen	Rems-Murr-Kreis district (only Alfdorf, Berglen, Fellbach, Kaisersbach, Kernen im Remstal, Korb, Leutenbach, Plüderhausen, Remshalden, Rudersberg, Schorndorf, Schwaikheim, Urbach, Waiblingen, Weinstadt, Welzheim, Winnenden, and Winterbach municipalities)
2005	265	Waiblingen	Rems-Murr-Kreis district (only Alfdorf, Berglen, Fellbach, Kaisersbach, Kernen im Remstal, Korb, Leutenbach, Plüderhausen, Remshalden, Rudersberg, Schorndorf, Schwaikheim, Urbach, Waiblingen, Weinstadt, Welzheim, Winnenden, and Winterbach municipalities)
2009	264	Waiblingen	Rems-Murr-Kreis district (only Alfdorf, Berglen, Fellbach, Kaisersbach, Kernen im Remstal, Korb, Leutenbach, Plüderhausen, Remshalden, Rudersberg, Schorndorf, Schwaikheim, Urbach, Waiblingen, Weinstadt, Welzheim, Winnenden, and Winterbach municipalities)
2013	264	Waiblingen	Rems-Murr-Kreis district (only Alfdorf, Berglen, Fellbach, Kaisersbach, Kernen im Remstal, Korb, Leutenbach, Plüderhausen, Remshalden, Rudersberg, Schorndorf, Schwaikheim, Urbach, Waiblingen, Weinstadt, Welzheim, Winnenden, and Winterbach municipalities)
2017	264	Waiblingen	Rems-Murr-Kreis district (only Alfdorf, Berglen, Fellbach, Kaisersbach, Kernen im Remstal, Korb, Leutenbach, Plüderhausen, Remshalden, Rudersberg, Schorndorf, Schwaikheim, Urbach, Waiblingen, Weinstadt, Welzheim, Winnenden, and Winterbach municipalities)
2021	264	Waiblingen	Rems-Murr-Kreis district (only Alfdorf, Berglen, Fellbach, Kaisersbach, Kernen im Remstal, Korb, Leutenbach, Plüderhausen, Remshalden, Rudersberg, Schorndorf, Schwaikheim, Urbach, Waiblingen, Weinstadt, Welzheim, Winnenden, and Winterbach municipalities)
2025	264	Waiblingen	Rems-Murr-Kreis district (only Alfdorf, Berglen, Fellbach, Kaisersbach, Kernen im Remstal, Korb, Leutenbach, Plüderhausen, Remshalden, Rudersberg, Schorndorf, Schwaikheim, Urbach, Waiblingen, Weinstadt, Welzheim, Winnenden, and Winterbach municipalities)

== Members ==
The constituency was first represented by Karl Georg Pfleiderer of the Free Democratic Party (FDP) from 1949 to 1957, followed by Friedrich Fritz of the Christian Democratic Union (CDU) from 1957 to 1961. Carl Roesch of the Social Democratic Party (SPD) was elected in 1961 and served one term. Former member Fritz regained it in 1965, but Manfred Wende of the SPD won it in 1969. He served two terms. Paul Laufs of the CDU then served from 1976 to 2002, a total of seven consecutive terms. Joachim Pfeiffer was representative from 2002 to 2021. He was succeeded by Christina Stumpp in 2021.

Election	Member	Party	%
1949	Karl Georg Pfleiderer	FDP	40.3
1953	Karl Georg Pfleiderer	FDP	32.9
1957	Friedrich Fritz	CDU	44.0
1961	Carl Roesch	SPD	36.6
1965	Friedrich Fritz	CDU	42.8
1969	Manfred Wende	SPD	42.7
1972	Manfred Wende	SPD	42.6
1976	Paul Laufs	CDU	48.6
1980	Paul Laufs	CDU	47.0
1983	Paul Laufs	CDU	54.2
1987	Paul Laufs	CDU	42.5
1990	Paul Laufs	CDU	47.5
1994	Paul Laufs	CDU	44.2
1998	Paul Laufs	CDU	42.8
2002	Joachim Pfeiffer	CDU	45.1
2005	Joachim Pfeiffer	CDU	46.9
2009	Joachim Pfeiffer	CDU	43.0
2013	Joachim Pfeiffer	CDU	51.5
2017	Joachim Pfeiffer	CDU	36.8
2021	Christina Stumpp	CDU	29.0
2025	Christina Stumpp	CDU	37.7

== Election results ==
=== 2025 election ===
Federal election (2025): Waiblingen
Notes:	Blue background denotes the winner of the electorate vote. Pink background denotes a candidate elected from their party list. Yellow background denotes an electorate win by a list member, or other incumbent. A ✓ or ✗ denotes status of any incumbent, win or lose respectively.						
Party	Candidate	Votes	%	±%	Party votes	%	±%
CDU	Christina Stumpp	69,223	37.7	▲8.7	61,351	33.3	▲7.6
SPD	Urs Abelein	31,594	17.2	▼5.5	26,984	14.7	▼6.9
FDP	Stephan Seiter	10,519	5.7	▼9.8	12,485	6.8	▼11.0
Greens	Sarah Heim	22,702	12.4	▼2.7	23,496	12.8	▼2.7
AfD	Lars Haise	33,167	18.1	▲9.3	34,225	18.6	▲9.7
Left	Avra Emin	9,725	5.3	▲2.7	10,731	5.8	▲3.0
dieBasis	Brigitte Aldinger	2,092	1.1	▼1.3	893	0.5	▼1.5
FW	Dirk Manske	4,714	2.6	▲0.7	2,350	1.3	▼0.2
Tierschutzpartei					1,686	0.9	▼0.2
PARTEI				▼1.4	705	0.4	▼0.5
Pirates							▼0.5
Team Todenhöfer							▼0.4
ÖDP					329	0.2	▼0.1
Volt				▼0.4	1,161	0.6	▲0.4
Bündnis C					373	0.2	Steady
Bürgerbewegung							▼0.4
BD					215	0.1	
Gesundheitsforschung							▼0.1
Humanists							▼0.1
BSW					7,032	3.8	▼0.2
MLPD				▼0.1	373	0.2	0.0
Informal votes		1,227			868		
Total valid votes		183,736			184,095		
Turnout		184,963	84.2	▲4.9			
CDU hold	Majority			▲8.7			

=== 2021 election ===
Federal election (2021): Waiblingen
Notes:	Blue background denotes the winner of the electorate vote. Pink background denotes a candidate elected from their party list. Yellow background denotes an electorate win by a list member, or other incumbent. A ✓ or ✗ denotes status of any incumbent, win or lose respectively.						
Party	Candidate	Votes	%	±%	Party votes	%	±%
CDU	Christina Stumpp	50,566	29.0	▼7.8	44,987	25.7	▼7.3
SPD	Urs Abelein	39,642	22.7	▲3.5	37,753	21.6	▲5.7
FDP	Stephan Seiter	27,123	15.6	▲2.2	30,999	17.7	▲1.6
Greens	Annedore Kowatsch	26,224	15.0	▲2.8	27,098	15.5	▲3.3
AfD	Jürgen Braun	15,196	8.7	▼3.7	15,474	8.9	▼4.1
Left	Luigi Pantisano	4,464	2.6	▼2.3	5,001	2.9	▼2.7
dieBasis	Brigitte Aldinger	4,257	2.4		3,477	2.0	
FW	Volker Hepp	3,280	1.9		2,452	1.4	▲0.8
Tierschutzpartei					1,958	1.1	▲0.2
PARTEI	Friedrich Häfner	2,381	1.4		1,495	0.9	▲0.3
Pirates					902	0.5	▼0.1
Team Todenhöfer					768	0.4	
ÖDP					473	0.3	▼0.1
Volt	Anna Schorn	658	0.4		454	0.3	
Bündnis C					402	0.2	
Bürgerbewegung					201	0.1	
DiB	Kai Dorra	460	0.3		187	0.1	0.0
Gesundheitsforschung					178	0.1	
Humanists					166	0.1	
NPD					121	0.1	▼0.2
MLPD	Dieter Böttcher	156	0.1	▼0.1	77	0.0	0.0
LKR					44	0.0	
Bündnis 21					43	0.0	
DKP					39	0.0	0.0
Informal votes		1,434			1,092		
Total valid votes		174,407			174,749		
Turnout		175,841	79.3	▼0.7			
CDU hold	Majority	10,924	6.3	▼11.3			

=== 2017 election ===
Federal election (2017): Waiblingen
Notes:	Blue background denotes the winner of the electorate vote. Pink background denotes a candidate elected from their party list. Yellow background denotes an electorate win by a list member, or other incumbent. A ✓ or ✗ denotes status of any incumbent, win or lose respectively.						
Party	Candidate	Votes	%	±%	Party votes	%	±%
CDU	✓ Joachim Pfeiffer	64,958	36.8	▼14.6	58,372	33.0	▼12.6
SPD	Sybille Mack	33,898	19.2	▼3.8	28,146	15.9	▼4.2
FDP	Lisa Walter	23,568	13.4	▲9.6	28,617	16.2	▲8.3
AfD	Jürgen Braun	21,863	12.4	▲8.6	22,870	12.9	▲7.5
Greens	Andrea Sieber	21,542	12.2	▲1.7	21,539	12.2	▲1.9
Left	Reinhard Neudorfer	8,626	4.9	▲1.2	9,881	5.6	▲1.1
Tierschutzpartei					1,555	0.9	▲0.1
Pirates					1,092	0.6	▼1.5
FW					1,036	0.6	▲0.3
PARTEI					963	0.5	
ÖDP	Uwe Olschenka	1,661	0.9		697	0.4	▲0.1
Tierschutzallianz					431	0.2	
NPD					403	0.2	▼0.8
DM					285	0.2	
DiB					240	0.1	
BGE					222	0.1	
V-Partei³					187	0.1	
Menschliche Welt					168	0.1	
MLPD	Dieter Böttcher	291	0.2		143	0.1	0.0
DIE RECHTE					25	0.0	
DKP					21	0.0	
Informal votes		1,933			1,447		
Total valid votes		176,407			176,893		
Turnout		178,340	80.0	▲2.7			
CDU hold	Majority	31,060	17.6	▼11.0			

=== 2013 election ===
Federal election (2013): Waiblingen
Notes:	Blue background denotes the winner of the electorate vote. Pink background denotes a candidate elected from their party list. Yellow background denotes an electorate win by a list member, or other incumbent. A ✓ or ✗ denotes status of any incumbent, win or lose respectively.						
Party	Candidate	Votes	%	±%	Party votes	%	±%
CDU	✓ Joachim Pfeiffer	87,082	51.4	▲8.4	77,461	45.6	▲12.4
SPD	Alexander Bauer	38,908	23.0	▼4.2	34,086	20.1	▲0.7
Greens	Andrea Sieber	17,838	10.5	▲1.0	17,511	10.3	▼3.8
AfD	Dieter Bielang	6,503	3.8		9,160	5.4	
FDP	Hartfrid Wolff	6,354	3.8	▼8.5	13,327	7.8	▼12.9
Left	Udo Rauhut	6,211	3.7	▼1.7	7,663	4.5	▼2.0
Pirates	Volker Dyken	3,739	2.2		3,583	2.1	▲0.3
NPD	Jürgen Wehner	2,244	1.3	▼0.4	1,783	1.0	0.0
Tierschutzpartei					1,359	0.8	▲0.2
REP					665	0.4	▼0.5
RENTNER					640	0.4	
PBC					625	0.4	▼0.2
ÖDP					577	0.3	▼0.2
FW					564	0.3	
DIE VIOLETTEN	Thomas Bezler	520	0.3				
Volksabstimmung					399	0.2	0.0
Party of Reason					118	0.1	
MLPD					116	0.1	0.0
PRO					104	0.1	
BIG					102	0.1	
BüSo					16	0.0	0.0
Informal votes		2,110			1,650		
Total valid votes		169,399			169,859		
Turnout		171,509	77.3	▲2.6			
CDU hold	Majority	48,174	28.4	▲12.6			

=== 2009 election ===
Federal election (2009): Waiblingen
Notes:	Blue background denotes the winner of the electorate vote. Pink background denotes a candidate elected from their party list. Yellow background denotes an electorate win by a list member, or other incumbent. A ✓ or ✗ denotes status of any incumbent, win or lose respectively.						
Party	Candidate	Votes	%	±%	Party votes	%	±%
CDU	✓ Joachim Pfeiffer	69,575	43.0	▼3.9	53,864	33.2	▼5.3
SPD	Hermann Scheer	44,071	27.2	▼12.0	31,431	19.4	▼9.9
FDP	Hartfrid Wolff	19,793	12.2	▲6.8	33,634	20.7	▲7.0
Greens	Daniel Mouratidis	15,379	9.5	▲5.1	22,834	14.1	▲2.9
Left	Reinhard Neudorfer	8,627	5.3	▲2.9	10,511	6.5	▲3.3
Pirates					2,865	1.8	
NPD	Jürgen Wehner	2,720	1.7	▲0.2	1,775	1.1	▲0.1
REP					1,503	0.9	▼0.3
Tierschutzpartei					934	0.6	
PBC					907	0.6	▼0.1
ÖDP	Karl-Heinz Bok	1,477	0.9		881	0.5	
DIE VIOLETTEN					503	0.3	
Volksabstimmung					311	0.2	
MLPD	Angelika Göhner-Feller	319	0.2	0.0	140	0.1	0.0
ADM					124	0.1	
DVU					94	0.1	
BüSo					70	0.0	0.0
Informal votes		2,560			2,140		
Total valid votes		161,961			162,381		
Turnout		164,521	74.7	▼6.4			
CDU hold	Majority	25,504	15.8	▲8.1			

=== 2005 election ===
Federal election (2005): Waiblingen
Notes:	Blue background denotes the winner of the electorate vote. Pink background denotes a candidate elected from their party list. Yellow background denotes an electorate win by a list member, or other incumbent. A ✓ or ✗ denotes status of any incumbent, win or lose respectively.						
Party	Candidate	Votes	%	±%	Party votes	%	±%
CDU	✓ Joachim Pfeiffer	81,488	46.9	▲1.8	66,983	38.4	▼3.1
SPD	Hermann Scheer	68,120	39.2	▼3.5	51,024	29.3	▼3.8
FDP	Hartfrid Wolff	9,344	5.4	▼0.6	23,836	13.7	▲5.0
Greens	Alfonso Fazio	7,645	4.4	0.0	19,440	11.2	▼0.9
Left	Reinhard Neudorfer	4,296	2.5	▲1.6	5,593	3.2	▲2.4
NPD	Roberto Kurze	2,542	1.5		1,651	0.9	▲0.8
REP					2,067	1.2	0.0
PBC					1,221	0.7	0.0
Familie					1,121	0.6	
GRAUEN					960	0.6	▲0.4
MLPD	Angelika Göhner-Feller	425	0.2		210	0.1	
BüSo					130	0.1	▲0.1
Informal votes		2,709			2,333		
Total valid votes		173,860			174,236		
Turnout		176,569	81.1	▼1.7			
CDU hold	Majority	13,368	7.7				
