= Schorndorf (electoral district) =

State electoral district of Germany

16: Schorndorf
- Electoral district for the Landtag of Baden-Württemberg
- Schorndorf in 2026
- District: Rems-Murr
- Electorate: 95,999 (2026)
- Major settlements: Kernen im Remstal, Plüderhausen, Remshalden, Rudersberg, Schorndorf, Urbach, Weinstadt, and Winterbach

Current electoral district
- Party: CDU
- Member: Christian Gehring

Schorndorf is an electoral constituency (German: Wahlkreis) represented in the Landtag of Baden-Württemberg. Since 2026, it has elected one member via first-past-the-post voting. Voters cast a second vote under which additional seats are allocated proportionally state-wide. Under the constituency numbering system, it is designated as constituency 16. It is wholly within the district of Rems-Murr.

== Geography ==
The constituency includes the municipalities of Kernen im Remstal, Plüderhausen, Remshalden, Rudersberg, Schorndorf, Urbach, Weinstadt, and Winterbach, within the district of Rems-Murr.

There were 95,999 eligible voters in 2026.

== Members ==
=== First mandate ===
Both prior to and since the electoral reforms for the 2026 election, the winner of the plurality of the vote (first-past-the-post) in every constituency won the first mandate.

Election	Member	Party	%
1976	Günther Steeb	CDU	
1980	Guntram Martin Palm	CDU	
1984	Guntram Martin Palm	CDU	
1988	Guntram Martin Palm	CDU	
Apr 1992	Karl Walter Ziegler	CDU	
1992	Hans Heinz	CDU	
1996	Hans Heinz	CDU	
2001	Hans Heinz	CDU	
2006	Hans Heinz	CDU	44.8
2011	Claus Paal	CDU	39.2
2016	Petra Häffner	Grüne	27.1
2021	Petra Häffner	Grüne	29.7
2026	Christian Gehring	CDU	34.1

=== Second mandate ===
Prior to the electoral reforms for the 2026 election, the seats in the state parliament were allocated proportionately amongst parties which received more than 5% of valid votes across the state. The seats that were won proportionally for parties that did not win as many first mandates as seats they were entitled to, were allocated to their candidates which received the highest proportion of the vote in their respective constituencies. This meant that following some elections, a constituency would have one or more members elected under a second mandate.

Prior to 2011, these second mandates were allocated to the party candidates who got the greatest number of votes, whilst from 2011-2021, these were allocated according to percentage share of the vote.

Prior to 1992, no second mandate members were elected in this constituency.

Election	Member	Party	Member	Party
1992	Rudolf Bühler	REP		
1996	Jürgen Hofer	FDP		
2001	Jürgen Hofer	FDP		
2006				
2011	Jochen Haußmann	FDP	Petra Häffner	Grüne
2016	Jochen Haußmann	FDP	Claus Paal	CDU
2021	Jochen Haußmann	FDP	Christian Gehring	CDU

== Election results ==
=== 2026 election ===
State election (2026): Schorndorf
Notes:	Blue background denotes the winner of the electorate vote. Pink background denotes a candidate elected from their party list. Yellow background denotes an electorate win by a list member, or other incumbent. A ✓ or ✗ denotes status of any incumbent, win or lose respectively.						
Party	Candidate	Votes	%	±%	Party votes	%	±%
CDU	Christian Gehring	24,154	34.1	▲9.9	21,581	30.4	▲6.2
Greens	Florian Haßler	16,928	23.9	▼5.8	21,879	30.9	▲1.2
AfD	Stephan Schwarz	12,264	17.3	▲7.4	12,737	18.0	▲8.0
FDP	Jochen Haußmann	5,698	8.0	▼8.3	4,486	6.3	▼10.0
SPD	Peter Hutzel	5,631	8.0	▼2.5	3,527	5.0	▼5.4
Left	Avra Emin	2,801	4.0	▲1.3	2,328	3.3	▲0.7
FW	Dirk Manske	1,945	2.7	▲1.0	1,186	1.7	▼0.1
BSW					833	1.2	
APT					601	0.8	
Volt	Sven Schmidt	835	1.2		480	0.7	
dieBasis	Brigitte Aldinger	569	0.8	▼0.7	311	0.4	▼1.0
PARTEI					259	0.4	▼1.1
Bündnis C					181	0.3	
Values					127	0.2	
ÖDP					105	0.1	▼0.7
Pensioners					102	0.1	
Team Todenhöfer					54	0.1	
Verjüngungsforschung					53	0.1	
PdF					33	0.1	
Humanists					23	0.0	
KlimalisteBW					19	0.0	▼0.7
Informal votes		510			430		
Total valid votes		70,825			70,905		
Turnout		71,335	74.3	▲6.6			
CDU gain from Greens	Majority	7,226	10.2				

=== 2021 election ===
State election (2026): Schorndorf
Party	Candidate	Votes	%	±%
Greens	Petra Häffner	19,088	29.7	▲2.6
CDU	Christian Gehring	15,574	24.2	▼1.6
FDP	Jochen Haußmann	10,491	16.3	▲3.7
SPD	Kathrin Breitenbücher	6,700	10.4	▼2.2
AfD	Stephan Schwarz	6,380	9.9	▼5.5
Left	Patrick Exner	1,690	2.6	▲0.4
FW	Thomas Rolke	1,125	1.7	
PARTEI	Antje Waibel	963	1.5	
dieBasis	Brigitte Aldinger	943	1.5	
ÖDP	Thomas Schaal	516	0.8	▲0.2
KlimalisteBW	Markus Koch	484	0.8	
WiR2020	Silvia Boss	334	0.5	
Majority		3,514	5.5	
Rejected ballots		344	0.5	▼0.2
Turnout		64,632	67.7	▼7.1
Registered electors		95,490		
Greens hold		Swing		

== See also ==
- Politics of Baden-Württemberg
- Landtag of Baden-Württemberg
