= Buocher Höhe =

Wooded area in Baden-Württemberg, Germany

Buchoer Höhe
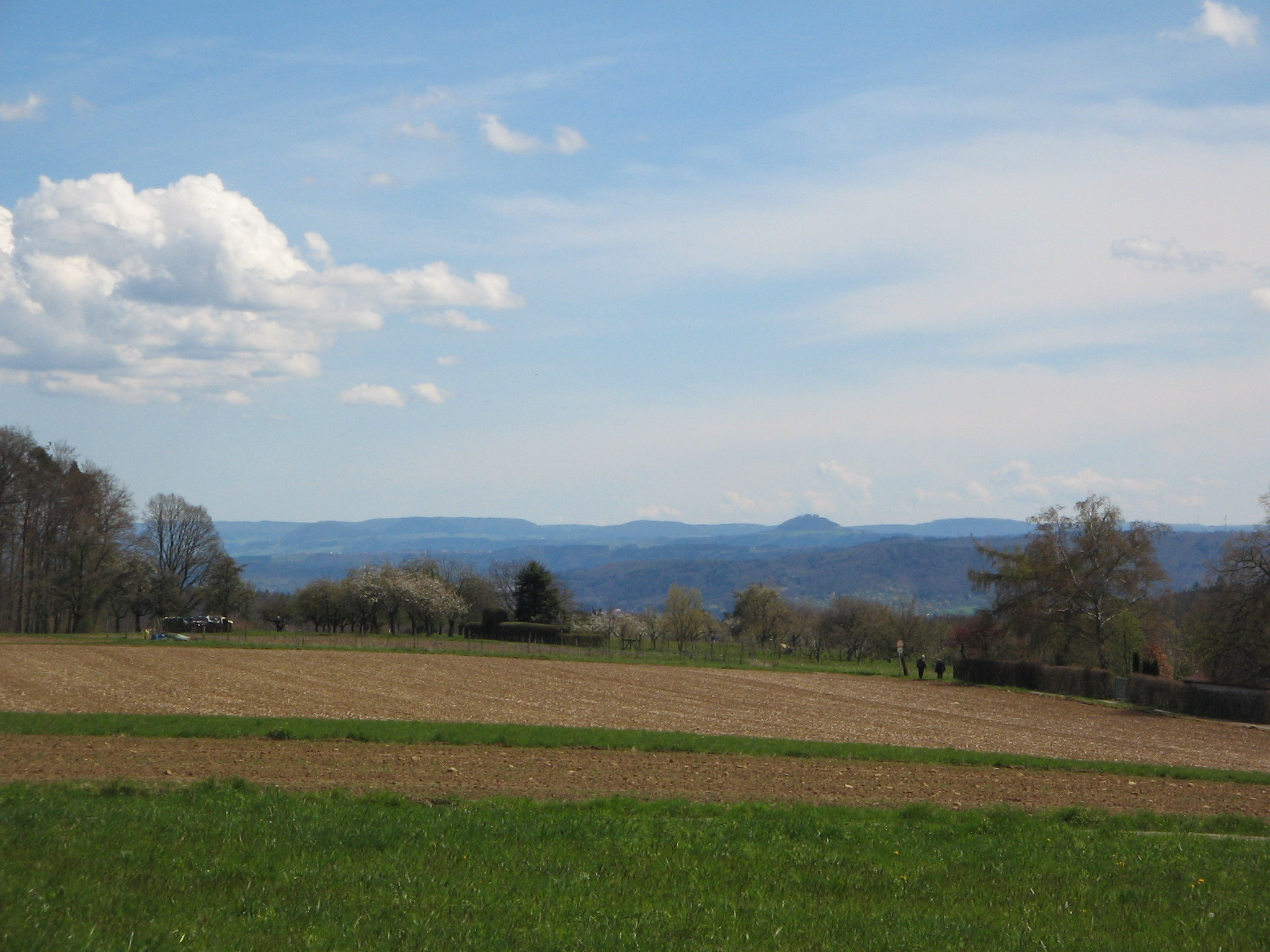
- View over the Buocher Höhe looking towards the Swabian Jura

Highest point
- Peak: unnamed summit near Buoch
- Elevation: 519.6 m above NN
- Listing: Hhills of Baden-Württemberg

Geography
- Location within Baden-Württemberg
- Location: Rems-Murr-Kreis; Baden-Württemberg
- Range coordinates: 48°50′13″N 9°25′32″E

The Buocher Höhe is a wooded region and hill range up to 519.6 m above sea level (NN), around the village of Buoch in the county of Rems-Murr-Kreis in the German state of Baden-Württemberg.

The Buocher Höhe is usually seen as the area on the southwestern edge of the forested upland of Berglen, which is sometimes viewed as an independent region.

== Geographic location ==
To the northeast the ridge is bounded by the Buchenbach valley. At its northeastern edge, on the sides of the valley are the villages of Lehnenberg, Spechtshof and Reichenbach. To the east, at open field system of Roter Stich, the Buocher Höhe is linked to the Berglen region by the saddle (420 m above NN) between Hößlinswart in the north and Rohrbronn in the south.

To the south the ridge drops into the Rems valley towards Geradstetten and Grunbach, the so-called Remshalde (which gives its name to the super-municipality of Remshalden); on the hillside is the Gundelsbach stream and the Ziegenberg. In the woods there are the open field systems of Hohe Straße, Marschallhölzle, Brand, Glockenholz and Eichenwald. To the southwest are the settlements of Groß- and Kleinheppach with the Kleinheppacher Kopf hill. The Hanweiler Saddle (364 m above NN) separates the Buocher Höhe from the Korber Kopf and Hohreusch. Towards Winnenden the Buocher Höhe descends via the "Großer Roßberg" hill via the terrace of Breuningsweiler, "Haselstein", Kleinen Roßberg and Stöckach.

The agricultural parts of the Buocher Höhe include the clearances of the Remshalden village of Buoch, the terrace of Breuningsweiler and the scattered orchards of Lehnenberg, Spechtshof and Reichenbach.

== Landscape and nature ==
=== Geology ===
The Buocher Höhe includes the entire sequence of the Keuper, its surface covered by the youngest stratum of the Jurassic, the Angulaten Sandstone. The clearances around Buoch correspond very closely to the occurrence of this calcareous Angulaten Sandstone, because it supports arable farming. Below this thin layer lies Rhätsandstein, which was formerly milled into blotting sand for the drying of ink. The old quarry has been filled.

==== Hills ====
Among the hills, high points and spurs of the Buocher Höhe and its perimeter are the following:

- Buoch clearance island (Buocher Rodungsinsel) with water tower (519.6 m)
- Großer Rossberg (511.7 m), east of Breuningsweiler
- Korber Kopf (456.8 m), north of Korb
- Belzberg (451.9 m), northeast of Kleinheppach
- Haselstein (447.5 m), north of Breuningsweiler
- Kleinheppacher Kopf (439.6 m), north-northeast of Kleinheppach
- Hörnleskopf (426 m), east of Korb
- Ziegenberg (392.2 m), west of Gundelsbach
- Rossberg (Kleiner Rossberg; 389.0 m), south-southeast of Winnenden
- Stöckach (351.9 m), southeast of Winnenden

=== Nature reserves ===
Since 4 November 1968 the Buocher Höhe, together with the Zipfelbach valley, the Korber Kopf, the Rems valley hillsides, the Ramsbach valley and the Grafenberg have been declared as a protected landscape with an area of 2,150 hectares.

The regulation issued by the Regierungspräsidium Stuttgart on 18 May 2009 declared the region of the Upper Zipfelbach Valley with Side Klingen and Parts of the Sonnenberg Hill (Oberes Zipfelbachtal mit Seitenklinge und Teilen des Sonnenbergs) as a nature reserve. It has an area of 41.6 hectares and is designated as reserve number 1275. The largest areas are maintained by the NABU branch at Winnenden, which has also published information on the region.

== Literature ==
- Hansmartin Decker-Hauff. Buoch durch die Jahrhunderte. Buocher Hefte, Vol. 1, 1983. ISSN 0177-7866.
- Eugen Bellon: Zur Siedlungs- und Weinbaugeschichte im Raum Waiblingen-Winterbach. Natur-Rems-Murr-Verlag, 1992. ISBN 978-3-927981-26-3.
- Manfred Hennecke: Die Buocher Höhe. Definition, Abgrenzung, Beschreibung und Ökologie. Buocher Hefte, Vol. 30, 2010. ISSN 0177-7866.
- Manfred Hennecke: Buoch durch die Jahrhunderte - Indiziensuche für die älteste Besiedlung. Buocher Hefte, Vol. 32, 2012. ISSN 0177-7866.
- NABU Winnenden (publ.): Das Obere Zipfelbachtal. Verlag M. Hennecke, Remshalden, 2007, ISBN 978-3-927981-89-8.
