= Lein (Kocher) =

River in Germany

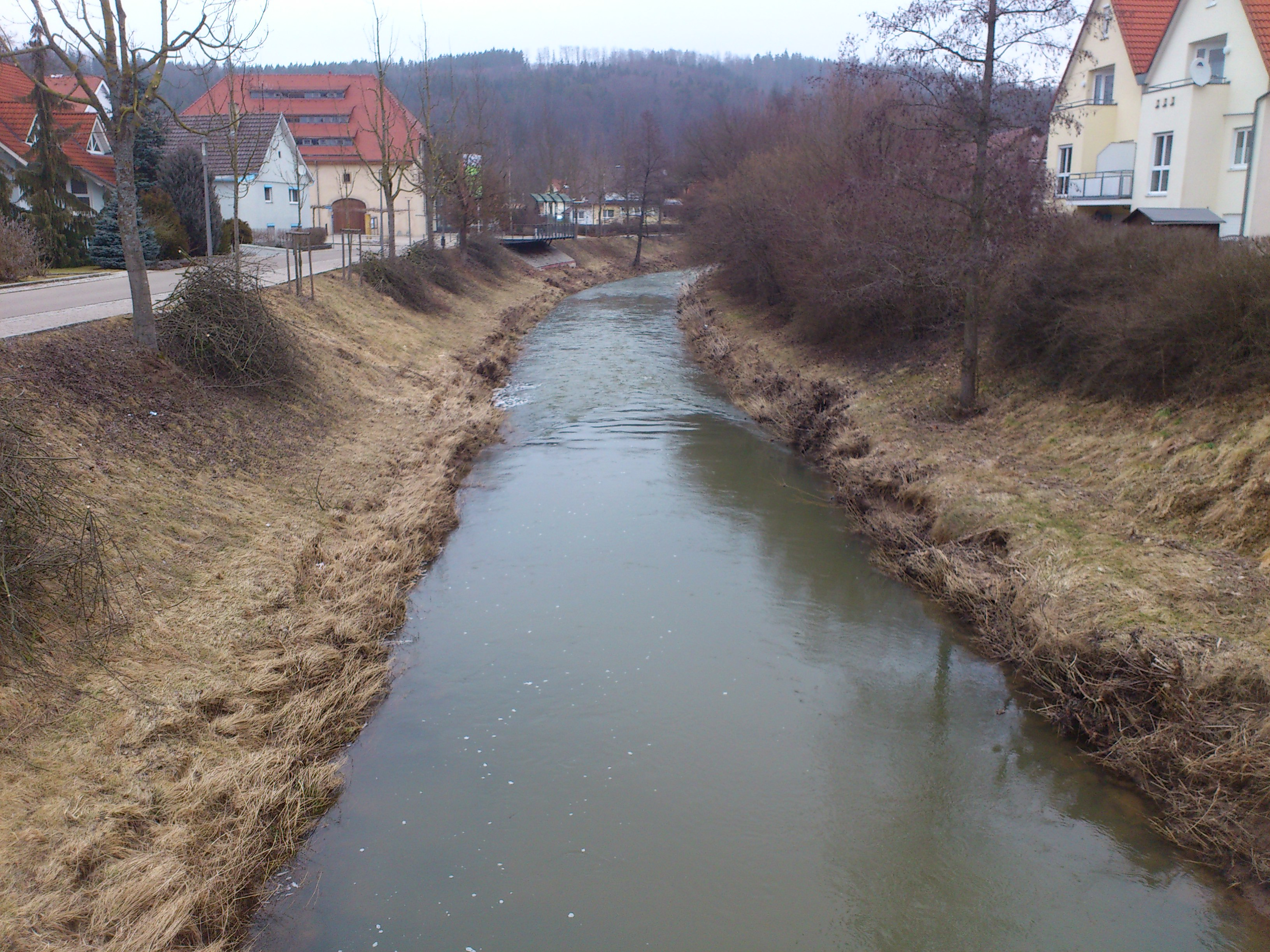

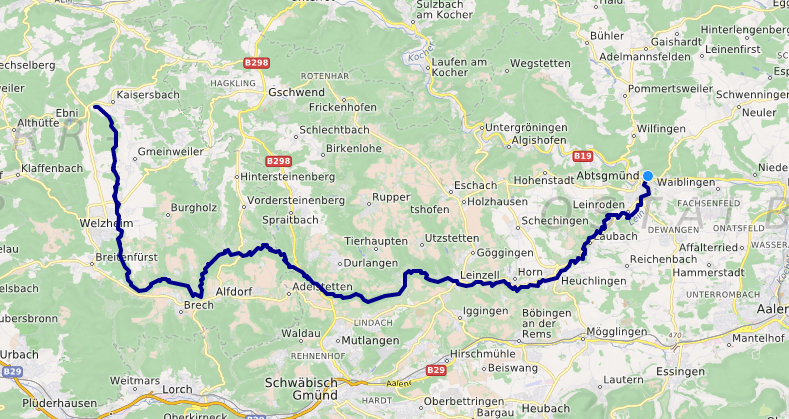
- Course of the Lein (interactive map)

Location
- Country: Germany
- State: Baden-Württemberg

Physical characteristics
- Mouth
  - location: Kocher
  - coordinates: 48.8967°N 10.0064°E
- Length: 56.8 km (35.3 mi)
- Basin size: 250 km^{2} (97 sq mi)

Basin features
- Progression: Kocher→ Neckar→ Rhine→ North Sea

The Lein is a river of Baden-Württemberg, Germany. It is a left tributary of the Kocher. The source of this 57-kilometer long river is near Kaisersbach. It passes through Welzheim, Täferrot, Leinzell and Heuchlingen, and flows into the Kocher in Abtsgmünd.

== Geography ==
=== History ===
From its source at Kaisersbach–Eulenhof, the river Lein flows quite steadily to the south and in the east past Welzheim. At Alfdorf–Haghof its course bends off to the east and maintains this direction with slight fluctuations until Heuchlingen, from where it reaches Abtsgmünd and the Kocher in northeastern direction. Its catchment area is mainly on its left side, because in its southern upper valley it has a strong competitor on the right side in the nearby Wieslauf and its tributaries with a clearly deeper erosion base, in the eastern middle course to Heuchlingen the Rems tributaries dig the water out of it so much that the watershed follows the Lein itself closely in the south, often only a few hundred meters away from the river itself. Only in the northeast-oriented lower course from Heuchlingen it has any noteworthy right tributaries at all, here it shares the ridge around Dewangen with the Kocher in about equal parts. Its tributary system has roughly the shape of a ridge: In the south and west the Lein itself is situated, from the north the larger tributaries are parallel to it.

=== Tributaries ===
From the source to the estuary:

- Spatzenbach (right), 1.6 km and 1.8 km²
- Seewiesengraben (right), 0.8 km
- Hofwiesengraben (right), 0,6 km
- Rötelbach (right), 1,1 km
- Pfaffenader (right), 0,5 km
- Göckelesbad (right), 0,6 km
- Ropbach (right), 1,3 km and 1,3 km
- Haschbach (left), 1.3 km and 1.3 km²
- Eisenbach (left), 5,4 km and 7,6 km²
- Mettelbach (left), 1.8 km
- Renisbach (right), 1,1 km
- Gellbach (left), 2.7 km
- Rot (left), 11.1 km and 34.9 km²
- Upper Gellbach (left), 3.8 km
- Spitzerbach (right), 1,8 km
- Schmiedbach (left), 1,1 km
- Krummbach (left), 2.7 km
- Reichenbach (left), 7.0 km and 9.6 km²
- Aitelbach (right), 1.9 km and 1.4 km²
- Spraitbach (left), 3.4 km and 3.3 km²
- Zimmerbach ('left'), 1.3 km
- Mountain stream (left), 0,9 km
- Durlang stream (left), 1,3 km and 2,3 km²
- Source of energy (right), 0,5 km
- Rot, also Gwenty red (left), 17,8 km and 49,0 km²
- Sulzbach ('left'), 3.3 km
- Hellenbach (right), 0,5 km
- (Leinzeller) Laubach (left), 3.0 km
- Götzenbach (left), 8.2 km and 18.1 km²
- Gögginger Bach (left), 1,0 km
- Brainkofener Bach (right), 1,2 km
- Ziegelbach (right), 0,7 km
- Krebsbach (left), 1,2 km
- Lohbach (right), 1,9 km
- Haftenbach (left), 0,7 km
- Federbach (left), 5,8 km and 10,2 km²
- Schönhardter Bach (right) 0,7 km
- Hackbankbach (right), 2,0 km and 1,8 km²
- Auchtbach (left), 0.5 km
- Aspesbach (right), 0,6 km
- Tiefenbach (right), 2.4 km
- Küferbach (right), 2.7 km and 2.4 km²
- Siechenbach, in the upper course 'Mühlbach (left), 2,9 km and 2,9 km²
- Schafwaldbach ('right'), 0,5 km
- Burgwiesbach (left), 1,0 km
- ("Reichenbacher") Laubach (right), 5,5 km and 6,7 km²
- Blumenwaldbach (left), 0.9 km
- Kauwiesenbach (right), 0,4 km
- Spatzenbach (left), 4.8 km and 8.1 km²
- Stapfelbach (right), 3.9 km and 3.0 km²
- Kotholzbach (left), 1.6 km
- Weiherbach (left), 1,0 km
- (Dewanger) Haldenbach (right), 3.8 km and 3.5 km²
- Attleswasenbach (right), 1,4 km
- Laubbach (right), 4,8 km and 2,9 km²

== Hydrology ==
=== Hydrological main line ===
Hydrologically, the Lein can be considered the main source of the Kocher system, as it is more than twice as long at the mouth of the river as this one (57 km vs. 25 km), whose name overflow also exceeds in the catchment area (250 km^{2} vs. 152 km^{2}) and also carries slightly more water than this one - despite its strong karst springs, which additionally feed from areas beyond its superficial watersheds.

=== Direction of flow ===
The direction of flow of the Lein is unusual. It consistently moves away from the Neckar, into which its water finally reaches via the Kocher, and its valley meets the Kocher in Abtsgmünd, in the almost opposite direction to that of the Kocher, which flows there in a west-northwest direction towards the Neckar. The reason for this is that the course of the river Lein was laid out at a time when the area was still draining to the southeast towards the Danube and the Black Sea. This is the case also with the neighbouring rivers "Spiegelberger" Lauter, Bibers, "Fichtenberger" Rot and the Blinde Rot, which flows into the Kocher from the other side just below Abtsgmünd in almost opposite directions. Today's outflow over the Kocher, the Neckar and the Rhine towards the North Sea was created only when the Upper Rhine Plain began to sink from the Eocene onwards and as a result the depth erosion in the surrounding river system of the Rhine increased. Through numerous stream captures of Danube tributaries the European main watershed shifted gradually to the southeast in favour of the Rhine.

=== Flood protection and retention basin ===
Nowadays the Lein and its northern tributaries feed numerous smaller reservoirs, many of which were built for flood protection and which also serve as bathing lakes (e.g. the Aichstrut reservoir) for local recreation. Others are old mill lakes, because at Lein as well as at the bigger tributaries many water mills were running in former times.

After recurring floods along the Lein, one of them in March 1956 finally gave the impetus for the founding of the "Wasserverband Kocher-Lein" (Kocher-Lein Water Association) by the neighbouring communities in 1957. For flood protection, the new association built eleven storage and retention basins between 1957 and 1982, which it still operates today. Five of these are located in the Rems-Murr district, six in the Ostalbkreis. They are constantly dammed to form small lakes. Most of them are developed for local recreation, some are designated as bathing lakes. The eleven artificial lakes together can hold back up to 14 million m^{3}, they lie between 390 m above sea level and 500 m above sea level and their total catchment area covers about 250 km^{2}. Between 1990 and 2000, 28.5 million euros were spent on a rehabilitation programme, partly on remote data transmission and remote control equipment, so that since 1997 all eleven basins have been centrally controlled and monitored.

== See also ==
- List of rivers of Baden-Württemberg
