= Tumbach =

River in Germany

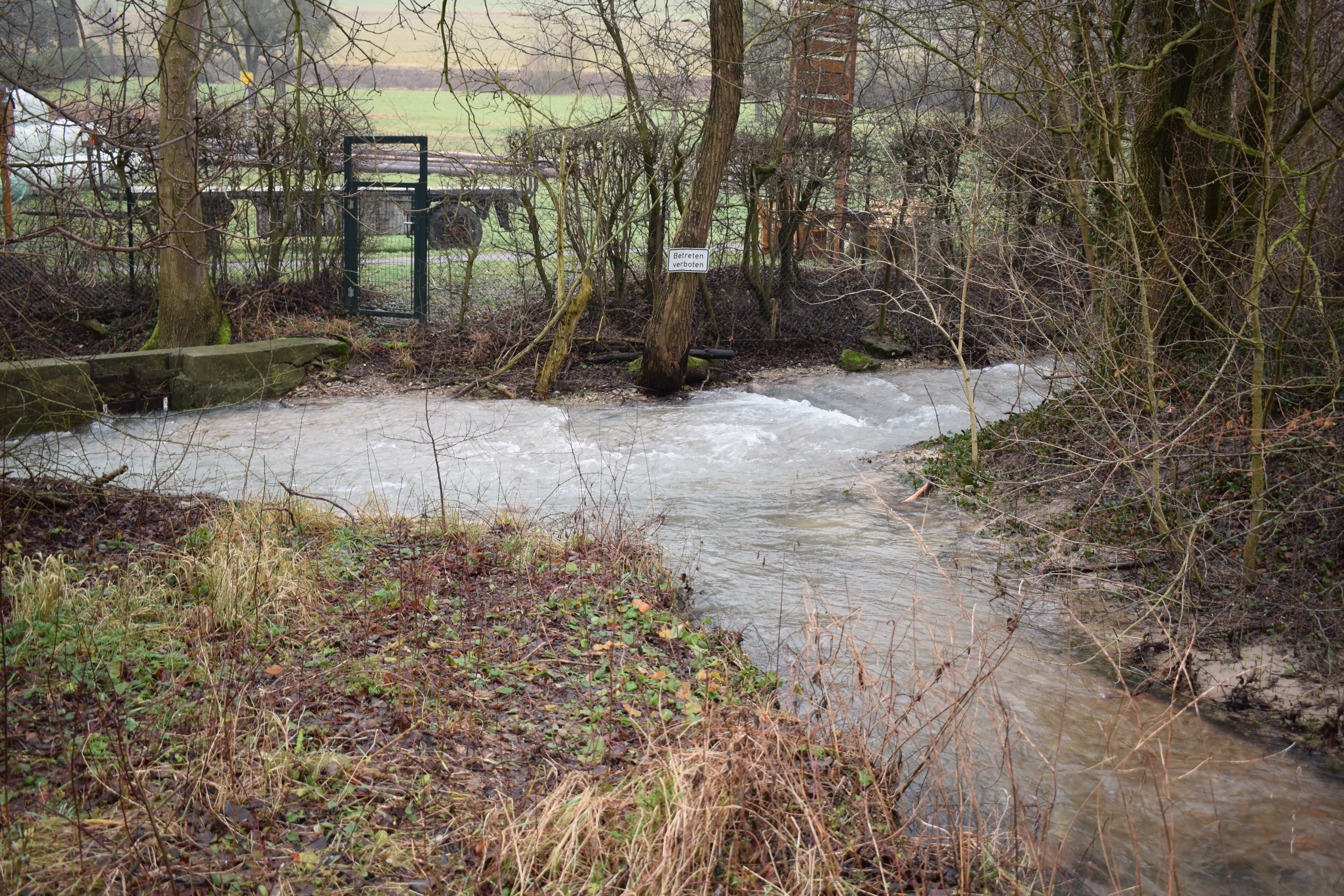

Location
- Country: Germany
- State: Baden-Württemberg

Physical characteristics
- Mouth
  - location: Klotzbach
  - coordinates: 48.7810°N 9.9287°E

Basin features
- Progression: Klotzbach→ Rems→ Neckar→ Rhine→ North Sea

Tumbach is a small river of Baden-Württemberg, Germany. It flows into the Klotzbach near Heubach.

== See also ==
- List of rivers of Baden-Württemberg
