= Rems-Murr-Bühne Leutenbach =

German theatre company

Coordinates: 48.87074°N 9.40548°E

Rems-Murr-Bühne Leutenbach is a theatre company based in Leutenbach, Baden-Württemberg, Germany. It is an amateur theater club that has its headquarters in Leutenbach and, in addition to performances in its home community, also goes on tour with its productions.

The association has existed since February 1981 and currently has around 50 members. The stage understands “amateur theater” as a form of non-professional theater (volunteer actors).
