= Affenthaler =

Grape variety from southern Germany

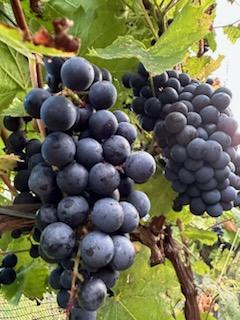
Affenthaler grapes ripening in New York

Affenthaler is a black grape from southern Germany named after the hamlet of Affental in Baden-Württemberg, Germany. The grape was first mentioned in 1791 and used to be grown along the Neckar River in Enztal, Remstal and Hohenlohe.

Its cultivation declined so sharply after World War II that there were only two vines left that were rediscovered in 2004. They were found in Kaisersbach and Steinheim an der Murr. As a late-ripening and frost-resistant grape, it is now grown in Germany, France, Italy, South Africa and the United States.

According to the Julius Kühn-Institut, Affenthaler is a cross between Heunisch weiss (also known as Gouais blanc) and Suess-schwarz (also known as Béclan). However, according to Wine Grapes, DNA testing has shown that it is probably a cross between Gouais blanc and another variety that may have gone extinct.

Affenthaler has ten synonyms:

1. Affenthaler blauer
2. Affenthaler schwarzblau
3. Blauer Affenthaler
4. Burgunder sauerlich
5. Kleiner trollinger ("little Trollinger", probably because it was cultivated alongside Trollinger
6. Morillon aigret
7. Pineau aigret
8. Sauerlicher burgunder
9. Schwarzblauer affenthaler
10. Trollinger klein
