= Ada Isensee =

German stained glass artist

- Born: 12 May 1944 (age 81); Potsdam, Nazi Germany
- Known for: Stained glass
- Spouse: Hans Gottfried von Stockhausen

Ada Isensee (born 12 May 1944) is a German stained-glass artist.

== Life ==
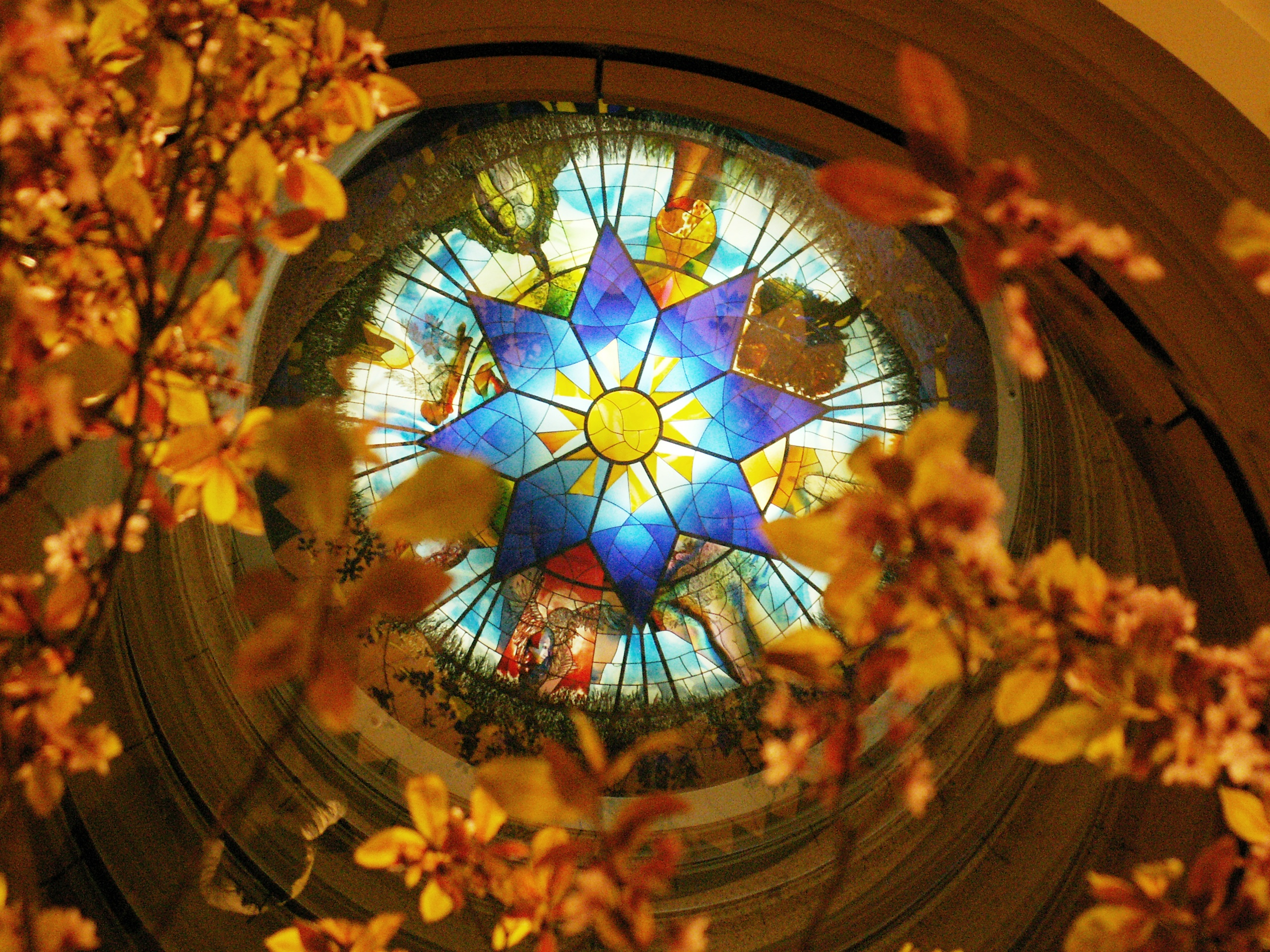
Her work in Hamburg at the Levantehaus

Isensee was born in Potsdam in 1944. In 1964, she began studying psychology at LMU Munich and completed her qualification at the University of Tübingen. She was complete in 1967 and went to study at the École nationale supérieure des Beaux-Arts in Paris.

Isensee has work in collections including the Corning Museum of Glass and she has led several exhibitions.

She was married to Hans Gottfried von Stockhausen who was another glass artist. They had moved in the 1970s to live and work in Buoch where they raised two sons. He died in 2000. In 2015 she was asked to create a retrospective exhibition in Remshalden.
