= Berglen =

- Municipality
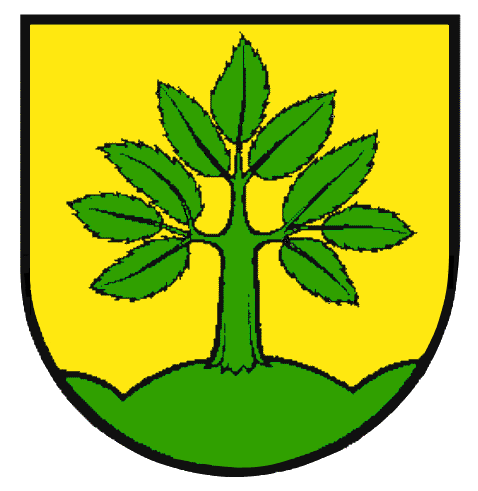
- Coat of arms

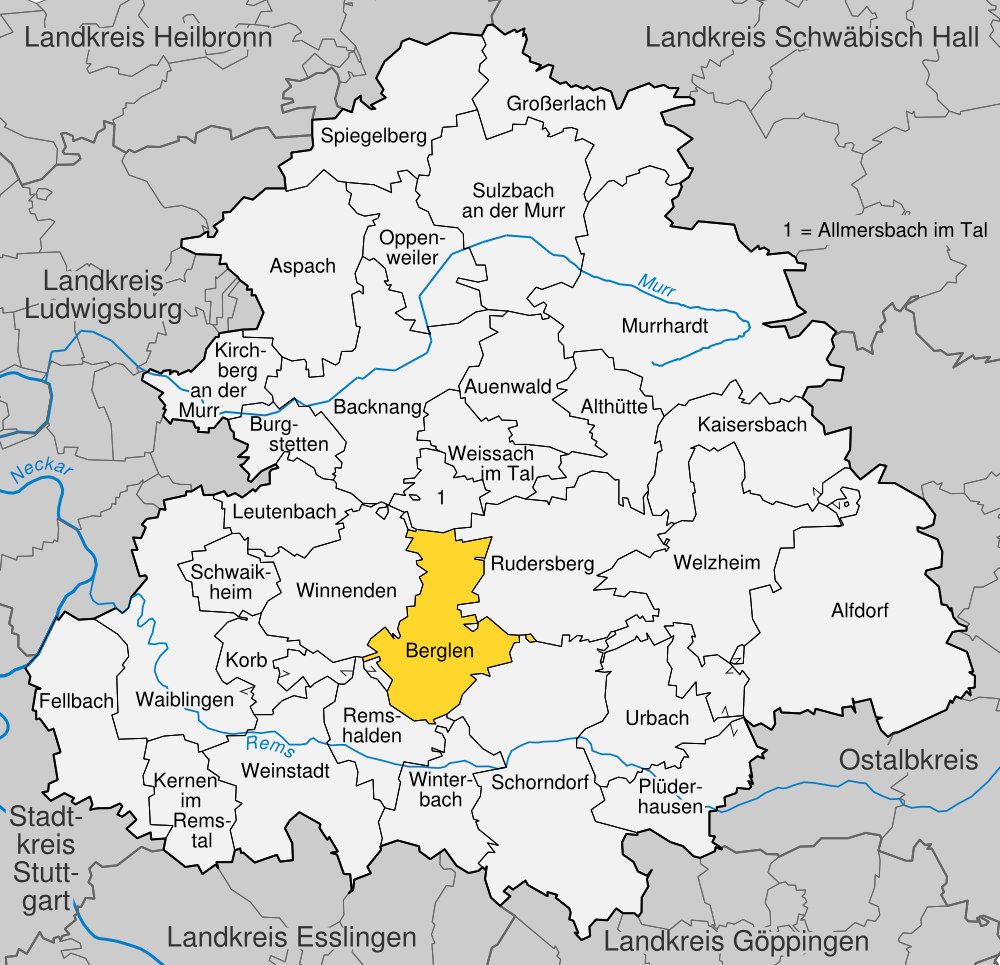
- Location of Berglen within Rems-Murr-Kreis district
- Interactive map of Berglen
- Location within Germany Location within Baden-Württemberg
- Coordinates: 48°51′41″N 09°28′10″E
- Country: Germany
- State: Baden-Württemberg
- Admin. region: Stuttgart
- District: Rems-Murr-Kreis
- Subdivisions: 21 Orte

Government
  - Mayor (2021–29): Holger Niederberger

Area
  - Total: 25.87 km^{2} (9.99 sq mi)
- Elevation: 308 m (1,010 ft)

Population (2025-12-31)
  - Total: 6,861
  - Density: 265.2/km^{2} (686.9/sq mi)
- Time zone: UTC+01:00 (CET)
  - Summer (DST): UTC+02:00 (CEST)
- Postal codes: 73663
- Dialling codes: 07195, 07181, 07183
- Vehicle registration: WN
- Website: www.berglen.de

Berglen is a municipality in the district of Rems-Murr in Baden-Württemberg in Germany.

== Geography ==
=== Geographical location ===
The community Berglen is located about 25 kilometers east of Stuttgart in 300 to 450 meters altitude in the Keuper hill landscape Berglen .

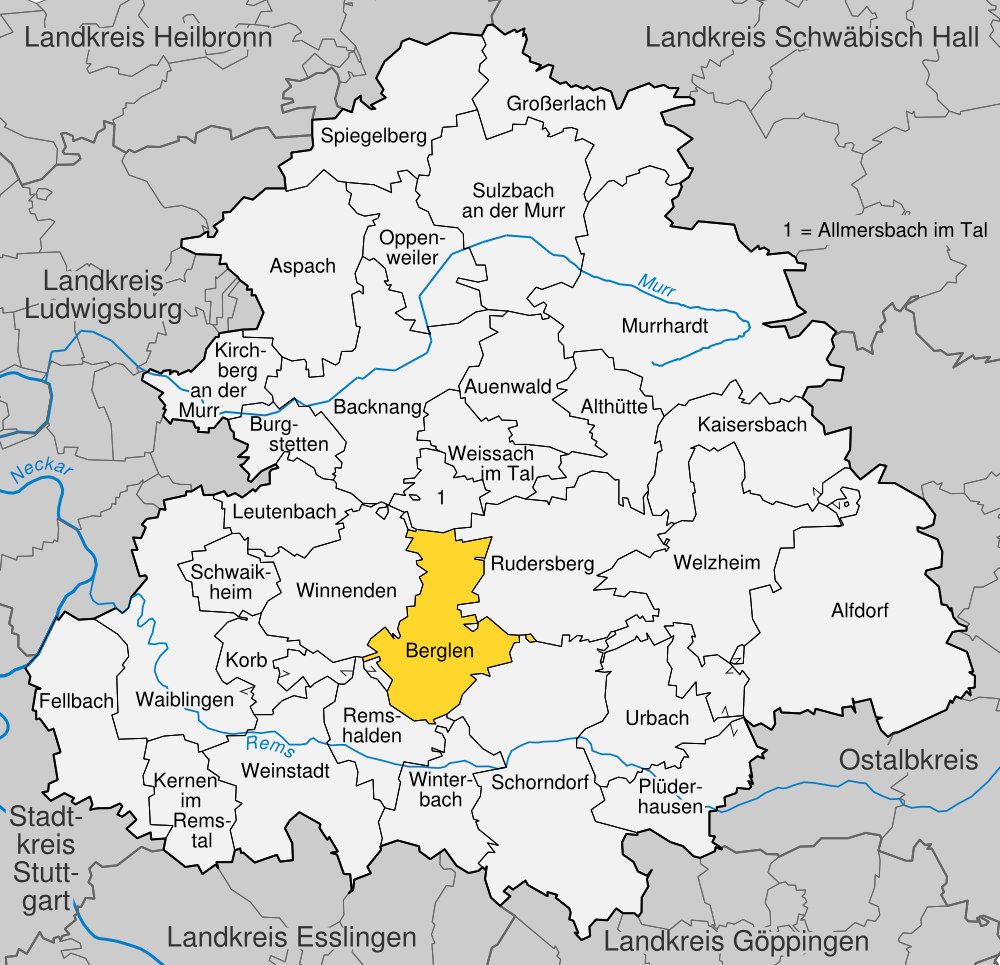
Berglen in Rems-Murr-district

=== Constituent communities ===
The municipality Berglen consists of the following nine districts: Bretzenacker, Hößlinswart, Barrenhardt, Öschelbronn, Oppelsbohm, Reichenbach near Winnenden, Rettersburg, Steinach, Vorderweißbuch.

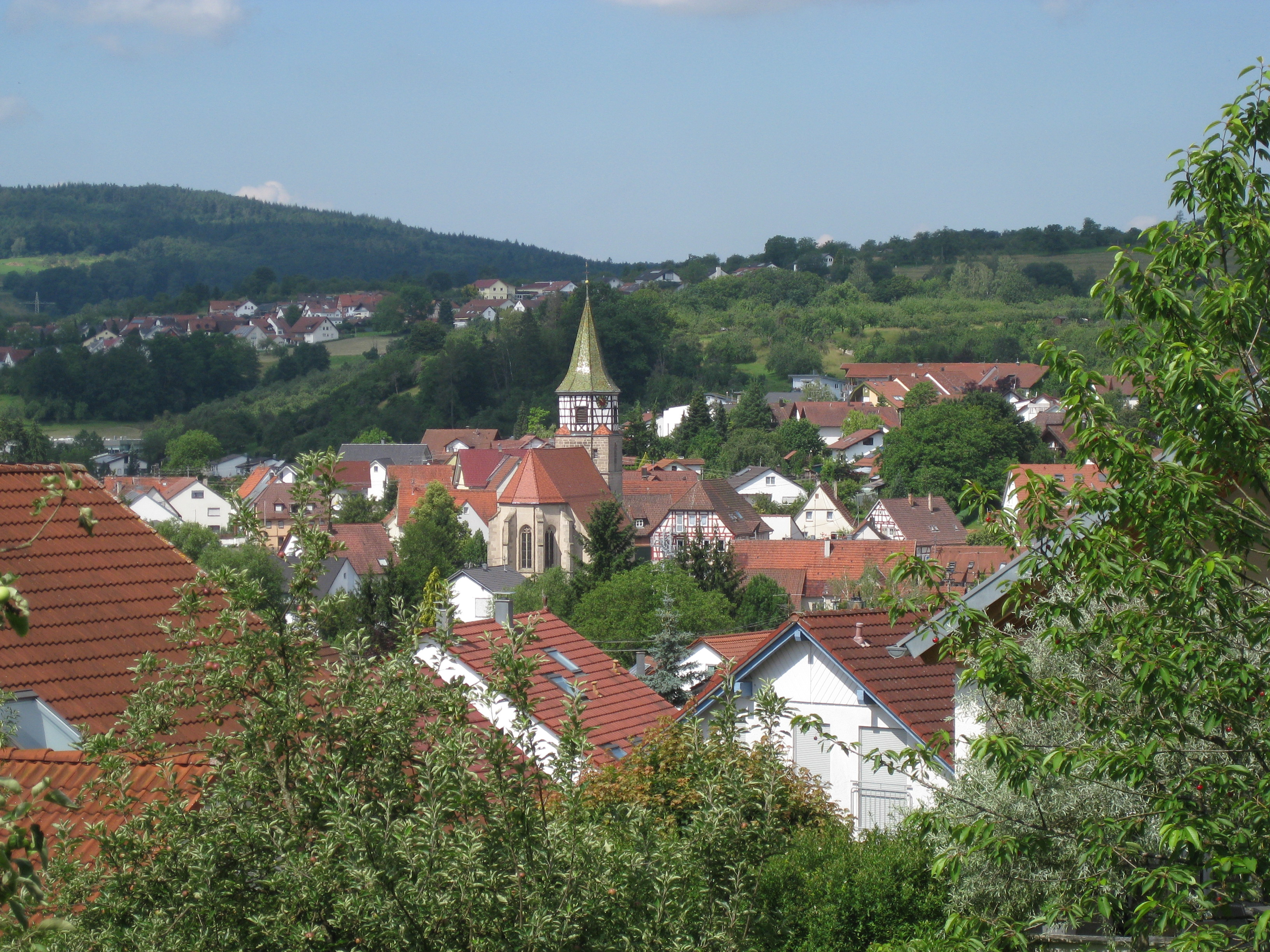
The view of Berglen from south Distlerweg

== Space division ==
Total 2587 ha

- 879 ha = 34,0 % forest
- 1352ha = 52,3 % agriculture
- 10 ha = 0,4 % recovery area
- 8 ha = 0,3 % water
- 162 ha = 6,1 % buildings
- 158 ha = 6,1 % traffic area
- 17 ha = 0,7 % others

.

== Religions ==
Since the Reformation the area of Berglen has been predominantly Lutheran. There are Protestant churches in Oppelsbohm and Hößlinswart. The church in Remshalden Buoch, to the south-west of Berglen is responsible for several districts.

== Mayor ==
- Gerhard Schnabel, Mayor of the former municipalities of Vorderweißbuch and Oppelsbohm from 1964 to 1972, and mayor of Berglen from 1972 to 1996
- Wolfgang Schille, Mayor from 1996 to 2012
- Maximilian Friedrich, Mayor since 2012-09-13

Parties and Voting communities		% 2014	Seats; 2014	% 2009	Seats; 2009
BWV	Bürgerliche Wählervereinigung Berglen (Free voters)	56,84	12	50,35	12
FBB	Freie Bürger Berglen (Free citizens Berglen)	26,20	5	29,90	5
SPD-OL	SPD-Open list Berglen	16,96	3	19,75	3
Altogether		100,0	20	100,0	20
Participation		57,14 %		58,93 %	

== Partnerships ==
Berglen has been in a partnership with Krögis, today part of Käbschütztal in Saxony since October 3, 1993.

== Economy and infrastructure ==
=== Education ===
With the neighborhood school In the Berglen there is a primary and high school with Werkrealschule. Moreover, Steinach and Vorderweißbuch have their own primary schools. Schools can be visited in the neighboring cities. For the youngest members of the community there are six municipal nursery schools, and also a private forest kindergarten.

== Regular events ==
- The Richtfest takes place annually in the Erlenhof district, organized by the Berglesbond association, which was founded in 1992.
- There is a Street festival by local clubs in the Hößlinswart district.
- There is a Christmas market on the Saturday before the 3rd Sunday in Advent in the Birkenweißbuch district.
- The Linde Festival, organized by the Weißbuch Music Club (Musikverein), also takes place every year in the Birkenweißbuch district, usually in the first holiday weekend.

== Personality ==
=== Freeman ===
- Werner Hofmann is the only honorary citizen of Berglen. The former school rector is the author of the chronicle and several native history books.

=== Sons and daughters of the town ===
- Friedrich von Klett (1781–1869), Württemberg administrative officer and Member of Parliament
- Johann Georg Hildt (1785–1863), foreman and architect
- Georg Bernhard Bilfinger (1798–1872), lawyer and politician
- Hansel Mieth (1909–1998), German-American photojournalist
- Jörg Hofmann (born 1955), trade unionist, president of IG Metall

== Other people ==
- Otto Mörike (1897–1978), a resistance fighter against Nazism, who was a Lutheran pastor in Oppelsbohm, has been declared a member of Righteous Among the Nations
- Manfred Winkelhock (1951–1985), race driver, lived in the municipality until his death
- Denis Scheck (born 1964), German literary critic, translator and journalist, grew up in Bretzenacker
