= Joachim Pfeiffer =

German politician

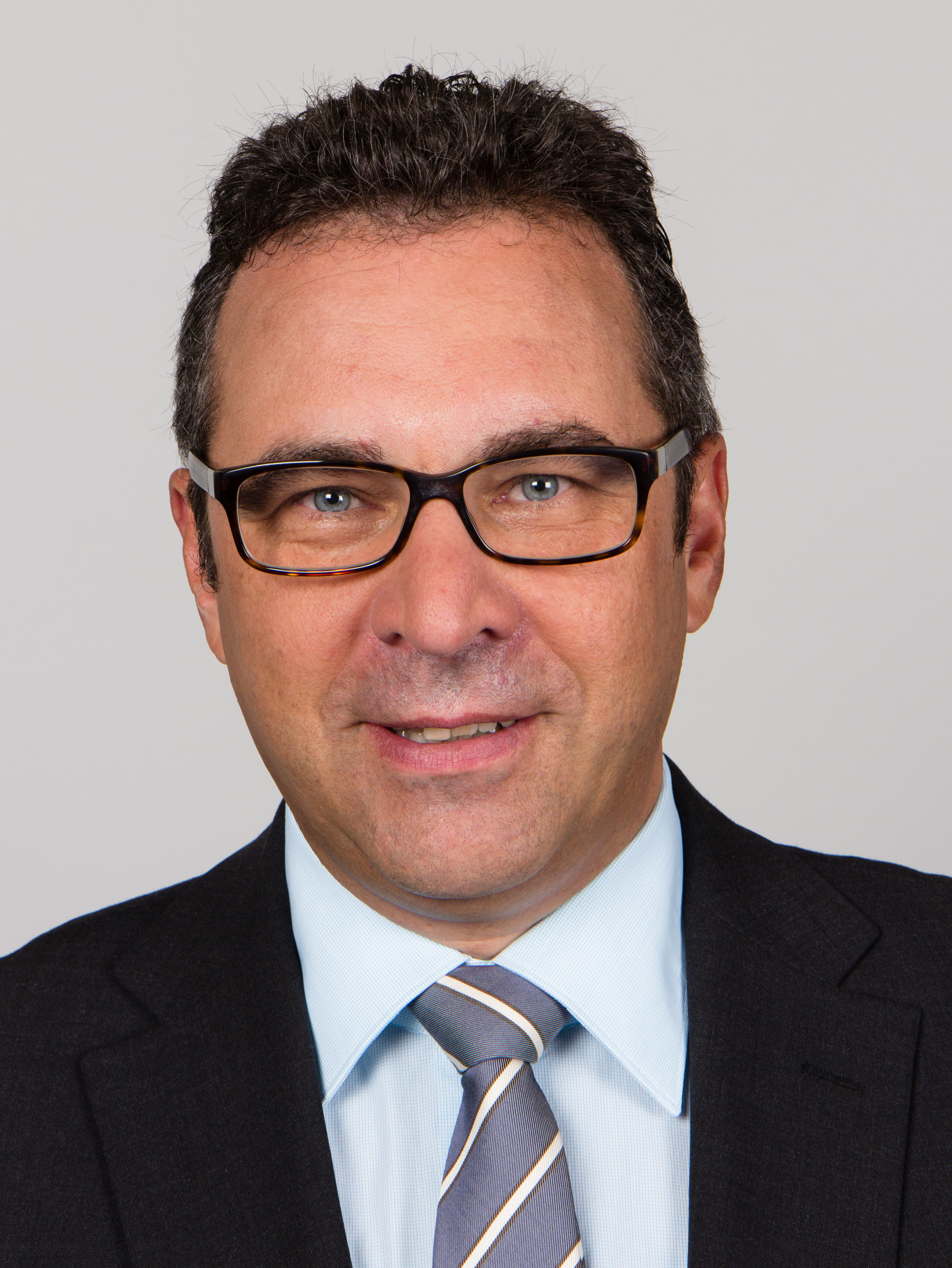
- Pfeiffer in 2014

Member of the Bundestag; for Waiblingen
- In office 17 October 2002 – 26 October 2021
- Preceded by: Paul Laufs
- Succeeded by: Christina Stumpp

Personal details
- Born: 25 April 1967 (age 59) Mutlangen, Baden-Württemberg, West Germany
- Citizenship: German
- Party: Christian Democratic Union
- Education: University of Stuttgart
- Occupation: Politician

Joachim Pfeiffer (born 25 April 1967) is a former German politician of the Christian Democratic Union (CDU) who served as a member of the Bundestag, the German federal parliament, from 2002 until 2021.

== Early life and career ==
Pfeiffer studied business economics at the University of Stuttgart. From 1992-1997, he worked for the electricity supply company Energie Versorgung Schwaben AG (EVS), where he was involved in controlling, mergers and acquisitions and public-private partnerships. He received his doctorate in 1997, and from 1997 until 2002 he was the head of economic and employment promotion activities for Stuttgart. Since 2006, he has been giving lectures on energy policy at the Institute of Energy Economics and the Rational Use of Energy at the University of Stuttgart.

== Political career ==
Pfeiffer represented the Waiblingen constituency from the 2002 election. During the first coalition government led by Chancellor Angela Merkel from 2005-2009, he served as the CDU/CSU parliamentary group's coordinator for energy issues and as deputy spokesperson for economic affairs. Since 2014, he has been the group's spokesperson for economic affairs and energy.

In addition to his committee assignments, Pfeiffer was a member of the German-French Parliamentary Friendship Group as well as of the Parliamentary Friendship Group for Relations with the ASEAN States. From November 2015, he was a member of an informal German-Russian working group on energy cooperation, convening parliamentarians of both the German Bundestag and the Russian State Duma as well as business representatives from both countries. From 2019 until 2021, he was a member of the German delegation to the Franco-German Parliamentary Assembly.

In the negotiations to form a coalition government following the 2009 federal elections, Pfeiffer was part of the CDU/CSU delegation in the working group on economic affairs and energy policy, led by Karl-Theodor zu Guttenberg and Rainer Brüderle. He has since served as the CDU/CSU parliamentary group's spokesperson for economic affairs. Following the 2013 federal elections, he was part of the CDU/CSU team in the negotiations with the SPD on a coalition agreement.

Pfeiffer won his constituency a fifth time in the 2017 election. By 2021, after several party members resigned from their seats amid corruption accusations, Pfeiffer too became the subject of journalistic investigations into his business activities. In April 2021 he announced that he would not stand in the 2021 federal elections, but instead resign from active politics by the end of the parliamentary term. In a public statement he explained he did not want to give up lucrative side jobs which, according to him, had helped rather than hampered, his independence as policy maker.

== Life after politics ==
Since 2022, Pfeiffer has been an associate partner at public affairs agency Kekst CNC in Berlin.

== Political positions ==
In 2008, Pfeiffer led a legislative effort to cut price subsidies for renewable energies by as much as 30 percent the following year; lawmakers eventually compromised on an 8 to 10 percent annual decrease over the subsequent three years.

During the eurozone crisis, Pfeiffer supported Germany's stance that it would oppose any plan to introduce euro bonds, calling them "poison."

On a 2011 trip to Tajikistan, he expressed support for the Rogun Dam project, calling "the best project for the development of the region."

When EADS and its American partner Northrop Grumman in 2010 cited unfair competition for abandoning their joint bid for a $35 billion contract to build tanker jets for the US military, Pfeiffer publicly called the move "a scandalous, unacceptable act." In a parliamentary debate over the government's decision on the sale of more than 200 model 2A7+ Leopard tanks to Saudi Arabia in 2011, Pfeiffer reasoned that it is in Germany's interest "to offer our employees in the defense industry long-term prospects." In a 2015 interview with DPA news agency, he held that Germany must do everything possible – including arms exports – to support Saudi Arabia and similar states, arguing that these countries would help to stabilize the "powder keg" in the Middle East.

In June 2017, Pfeiffer voted against Germany's introduction of same-sex marriage.

== Other activities ==
=== Regulatory bodies ===
- Federal Network Agency for Electricity, Gas, Telecommunications, Post and Railway (BNetzA), Deputy Chairman of the Advisory Board (since 2012)

=== Corporate boards ===
- Hitachi Power Europe GmbH, Member of the Advisory Board (2011)

=== Non-profit organizations ===
- Bundesverband Bioenergie (BBE), Member of the Advisory Board (2011)
- Global Panel Foundation, Member of the Advisory Board
- Rotary International, Member
- Theaterhaus Stuttgart, Member of the Board of Trustees
- Trilateral Commission, Member of the European Group
- Verkehrs- und Tarifverbund Stuttgart, Member of the Supervisory Board
- German-Jordanian Society, Member of the Parliamentary Advisory Board
