= Klotzbach =

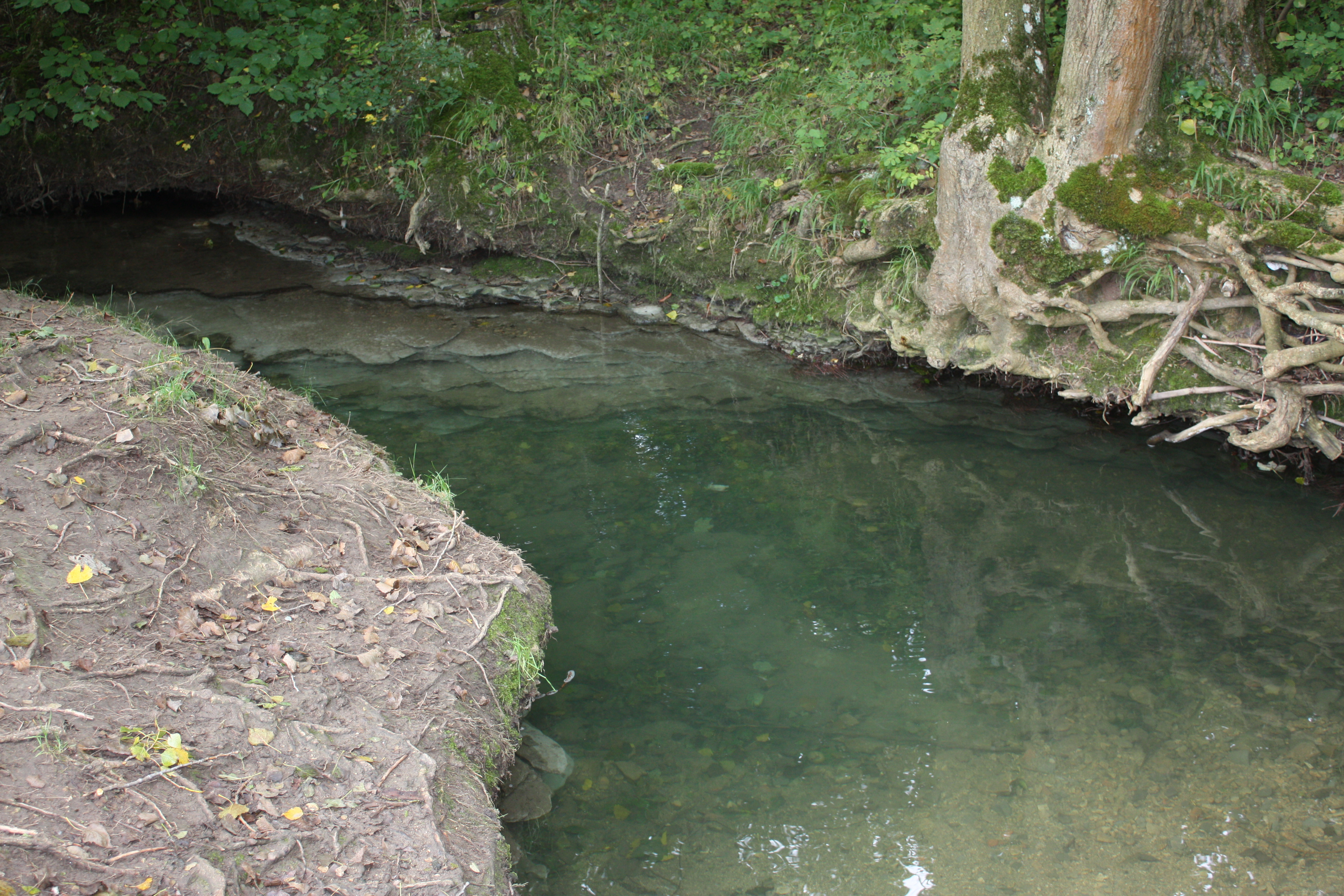

Location
- Country: Germany
- States: Baden-Württemberg

Physical characteristics
- Mouth
  - location: Rems
  - coordinates: 48.8208°N 9.91406°E

Basin features
- Progression: Rems→ Neckar→ Rhine→ North Sea

Klotzbach is a river of Baden-Württemberg, Germany. It flows into the Rems in Böbingen an der Rems.

== See also ==
- List of rivers of Baden-Württemberg
