= Christina Stumpp =

German politician

Christina Stumpp MdB
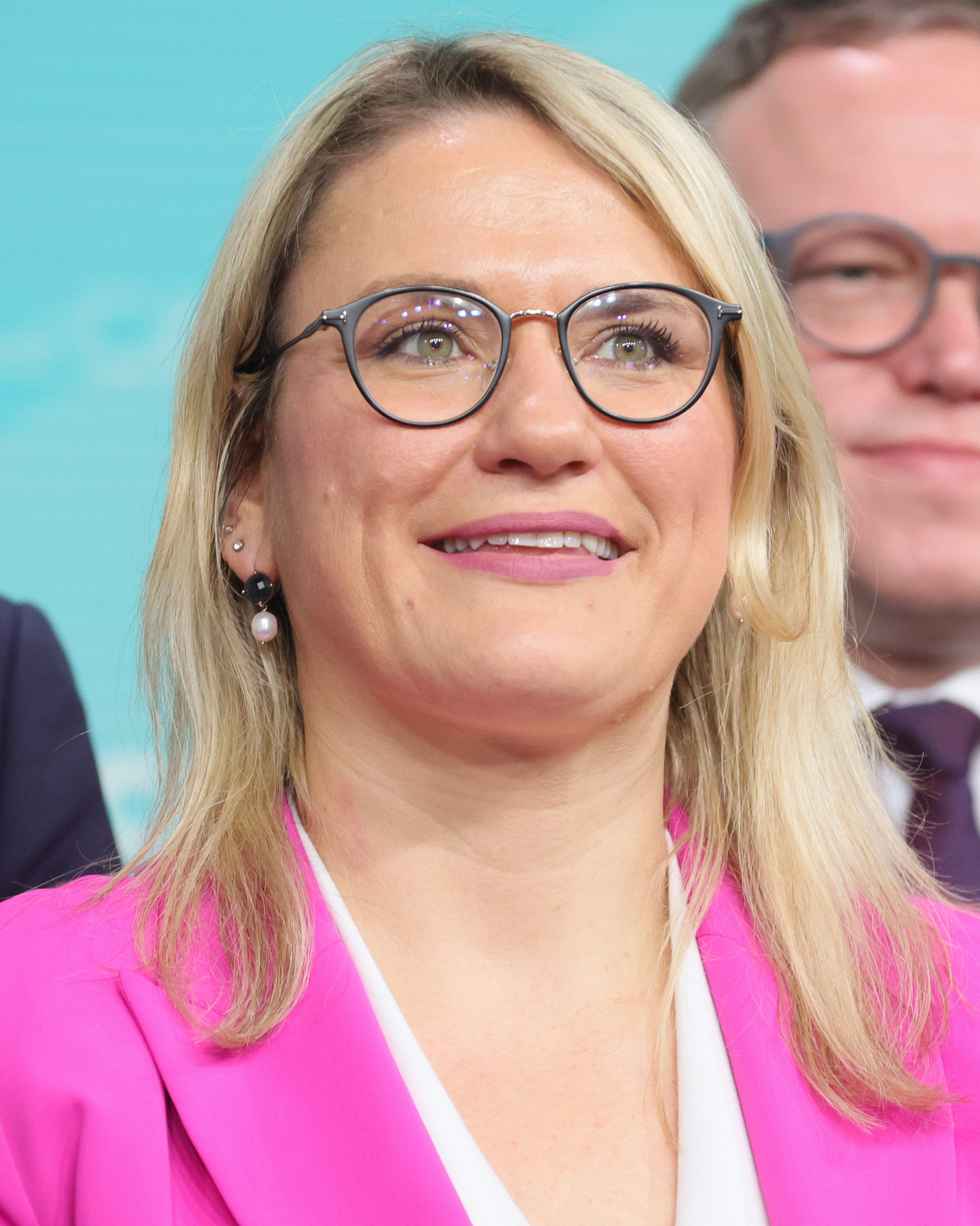

Member of the Bundestag; for Waiblingen
- Incumbent
- Assumed office 26 October 2021
- Preceded by: Joachim Pfeiffer

Personal details
- Born: 16 November 1987 (age 38) Backnang, Baden-Württemberg, West Germany (now Germany)
- Citizenship: German
- Party: Christian Democratic Union

Christina Daniela Stumpp (born 16 November 1987 in Backnang) is a German politician of the Christian Democratic Union (CDU) who has been serving as a Member of the Bundestag since the 2021 elections, representing the Waiblingen district.

== Early career ==
From February until September 2021, Stumpp worked as advisor to Baden-Württemberg’s State Minister for Rural Affairs and Consumer Protection Peter Hauk.

== Political career ==
Ahead of the Christian Democrats’ leadership election in 2022, Stumpp publicly endorsed Friedrich Merz to succeed Armin Laschet as the party’s chair and joined his campaign team. She was later chosen by Merz to be the first Deputy Secretary General of the Christian Democratic Union.
