= Stephan Seiter =

German politician (born 1963)

Member of the Bundestag
- In office 2017–2025

Personal details
- Born: 18 March 1963 (age 63) Nürnberg, West Germany
- Party: FDP
- Education: University of Hohenheim

Stephan Seiter (born 18 March 1963) is a German economist and politician of the Free Democratic Party (FDP) who served as a member of the Bundestag from the state of Baden-Württemberg from 2021 to 2025.

== Early life and career ==
Seiter studied economics at the University of Hohenheim from 1984 to 1989. Subsequently, he was the Theodor Heuss Lecturer at the New School for Social Research in 2000. From 2007, Seiter was a professor of economics at Reutlingen University’s ESB Business School.

== Political career ==
Seiter entered the FDP in 2016.

Seiter became a member of the Bundestag in the 2021 elections, representing the Waiblingen district.

In parliament, Seiter served on the Committee on Education, Research and Technology Assessment and the Committee on Labour and Social Affairs. From June 2022, he was his parliamentary group’s spokesperson for research, technology and innovation.

In addition to his committee assignments, Seiter was part of the German-Greek Parliamentary Friendship Group. In 2023, he co-founded the Cross-Party Parliamentary Group on the Situation of the Uyghurs.

== Other activities ==
- University of Hagen, Member of the Parliamentary Advisory Board (since 2022)
- American Economic Association (AEA), Member
- VfB Stuttgart, Member
