= Haselstein (Winnenden) =

German mountain

Coordinates: 48°51′29″N 9°24′04″E

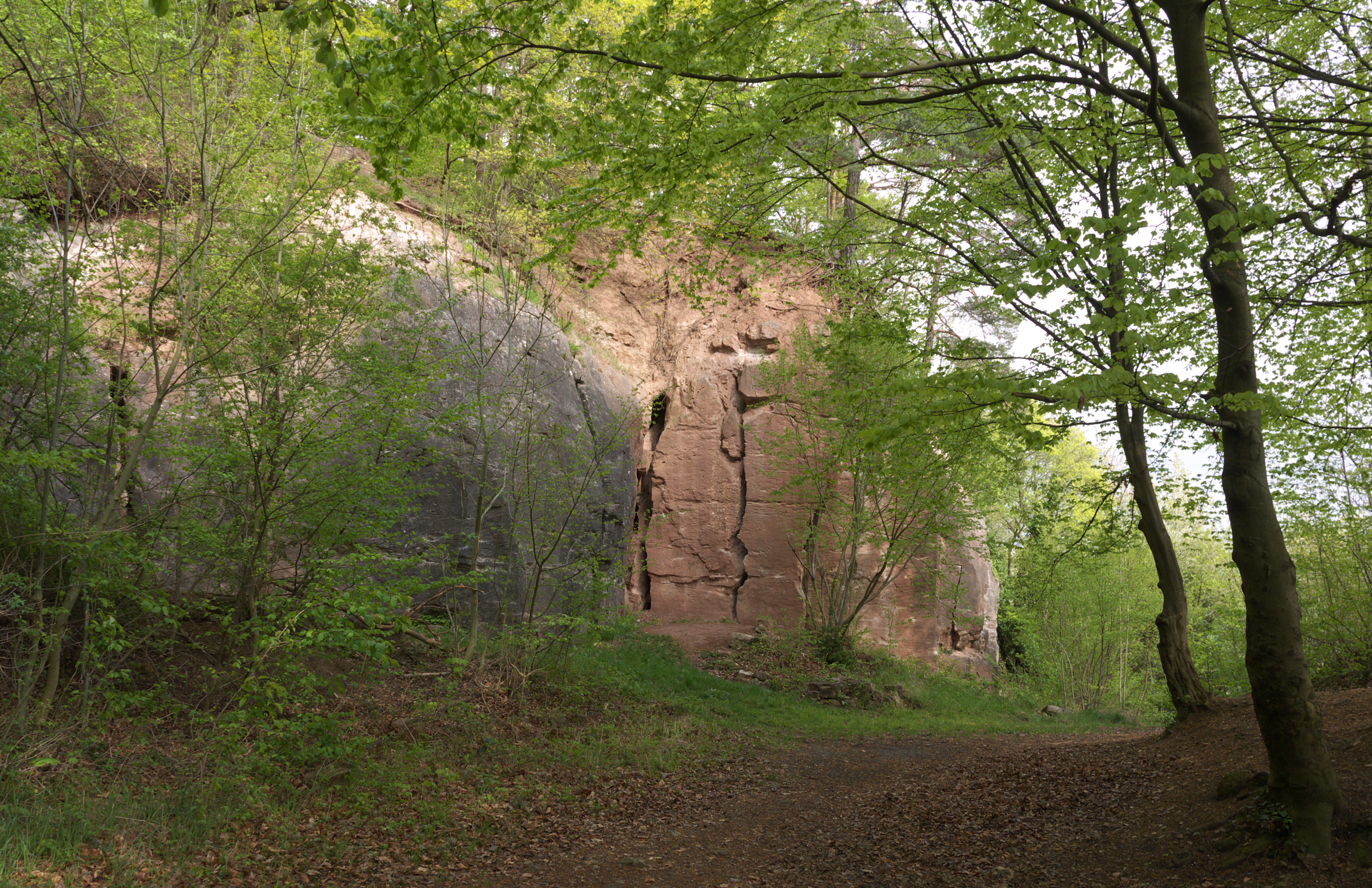

Highest point
- Elevation: 447.5 m (1,468 ft)

Geography
- Location: Baden-Württemberg, Germany

Haselstein (Winnenden) is a mountain of Baden-Württemberg, Germany.
