= Leutenbach, Baden-Württemberg =

Leutenbach
- Municipality
- Coat of arms

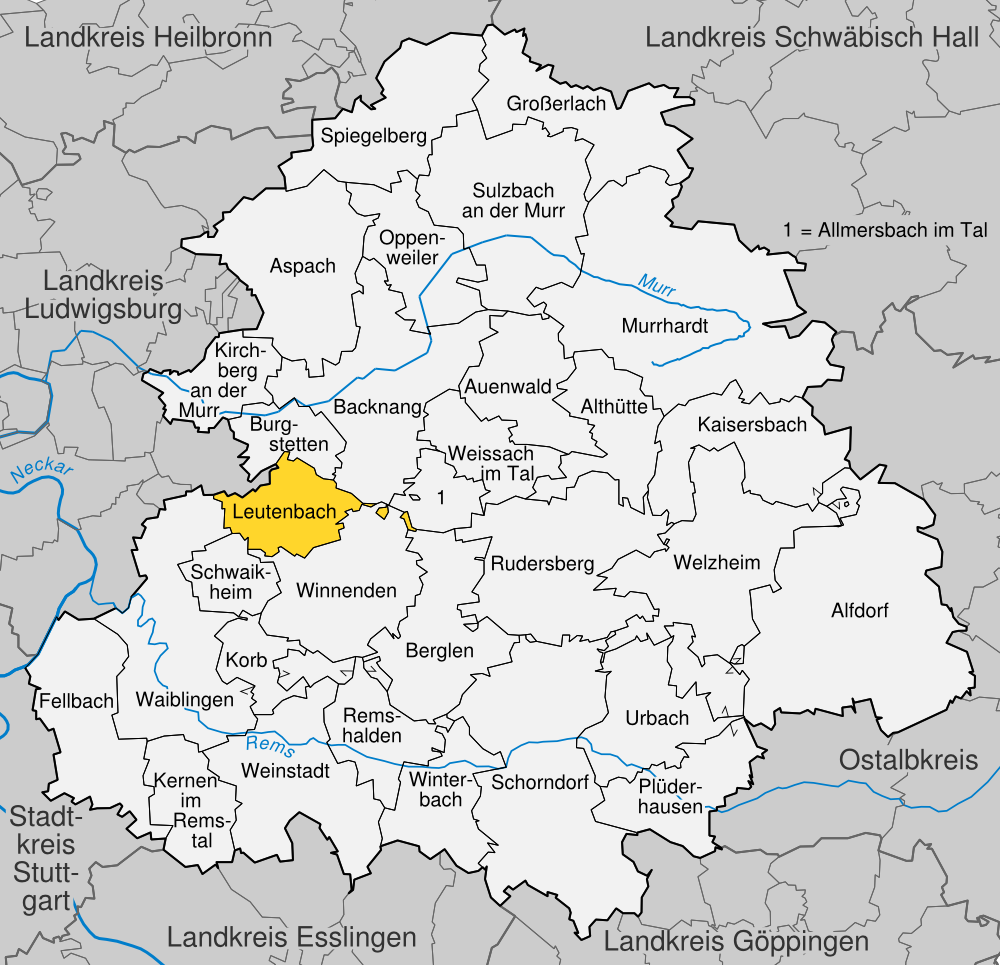
- Location of Leutenbach within Rems-Murr-Kreis district
- Interactive map of Leutenbach
- Location within Germany Location within Baden-Württemberg
- Coordinates: 48°53′18″N 09°23′29″E
- Country: Germany
- State: Baden-Württemberg
- Admin. region: Stuttgart
- District: Rems-Murr-Kreis

Government
  - Mayor (2023–31): Jürgen Kiesl (CDU)

Area
  - Total: 14.73 km^{2} (5.69 sq mi)
- Elevation: 277 m (909 ft)

Population (2025-12-31)
  - Total: 12,036
  - Density: 817.1/km^{2} (2,116/sq mi)
- Time zone: UTC+01:00 (CET)
  - Summer (DST): UTC+02:00 (CEST)
- Postal codes: 71397
- Dialling codes: 07195
- Vehicle registration: WN
- Website: www.leutenbach.de

Leutenbach (German pronunciation: [ˈlɔʏtn̩bax]) is a municipality in the Rems-Murr district, in Baden-Württemberg, Germany. It is located 15 km east of Ludwigsburg, and 20 km northeast of Stuttgart.

The footballer Andreas Hinkel, formerly VfB Stuttgart, now Celtic F.C., and also a player for the Germany national team, was born in Backnang, but grew up in Leutenbach. Spree killer Tim Kretschmer grew up and lived in Leutenbach.

== Economy and infrastructure ==
The Stuttgart S-Bahn connects the municipality with Stuttgart.

== Transportation ==
Nellmersbach is a breakpoint at the Waiblingen-Schwäbisch Hall railway. The line S3 (Backnang-Stuttgart Airport) that connects Nellmersbach in 15- to 30-minute intervals with the state capital Stuttgart runs on this route. In September 2009, a new lane of highway 14 was opened, allowing the western bypass of Winnenden. Therefore, the over one kilometer long Leutenbachtunnel was built.

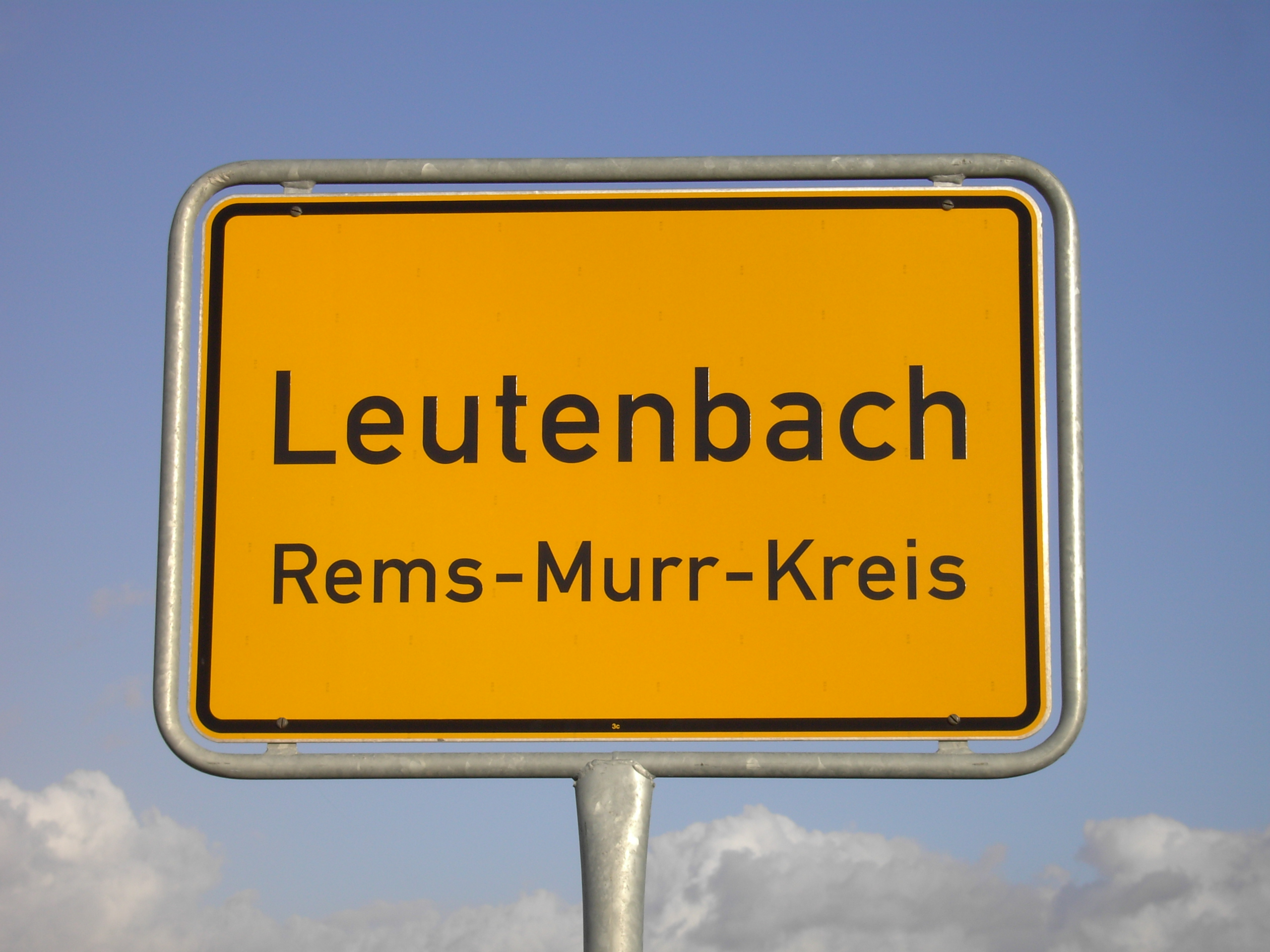
Leutenbach

=== Established businesses ===
HP Kaysser, sheet metal working and processing.

=== Media ===
The daily newspaper Winnender Zeitung reports on the local current affairs in Leutenbach.

== Education ==
Primary schools are located in all three neighborhoods of Leutenbach as well as a Werkrealschule. Schools are located in Winnenden and Backnang. There are a total of seven kindergartens. Leutenbach also has a branch of the Folk high school Winnenden.

== Demographics ==
Population development:

| Year | Inhabitants |
|---|---|
| 1990 | 9,752 |
| 2001 | 10,686 |
| 2011 | 10,650 |
| 2021 | 11,762 |

== Sport clubs ==
A detailed list of all Leutenbach clubs can be found on the website of the municipality.
