= Christian Gehring =

German politician (born 1979)

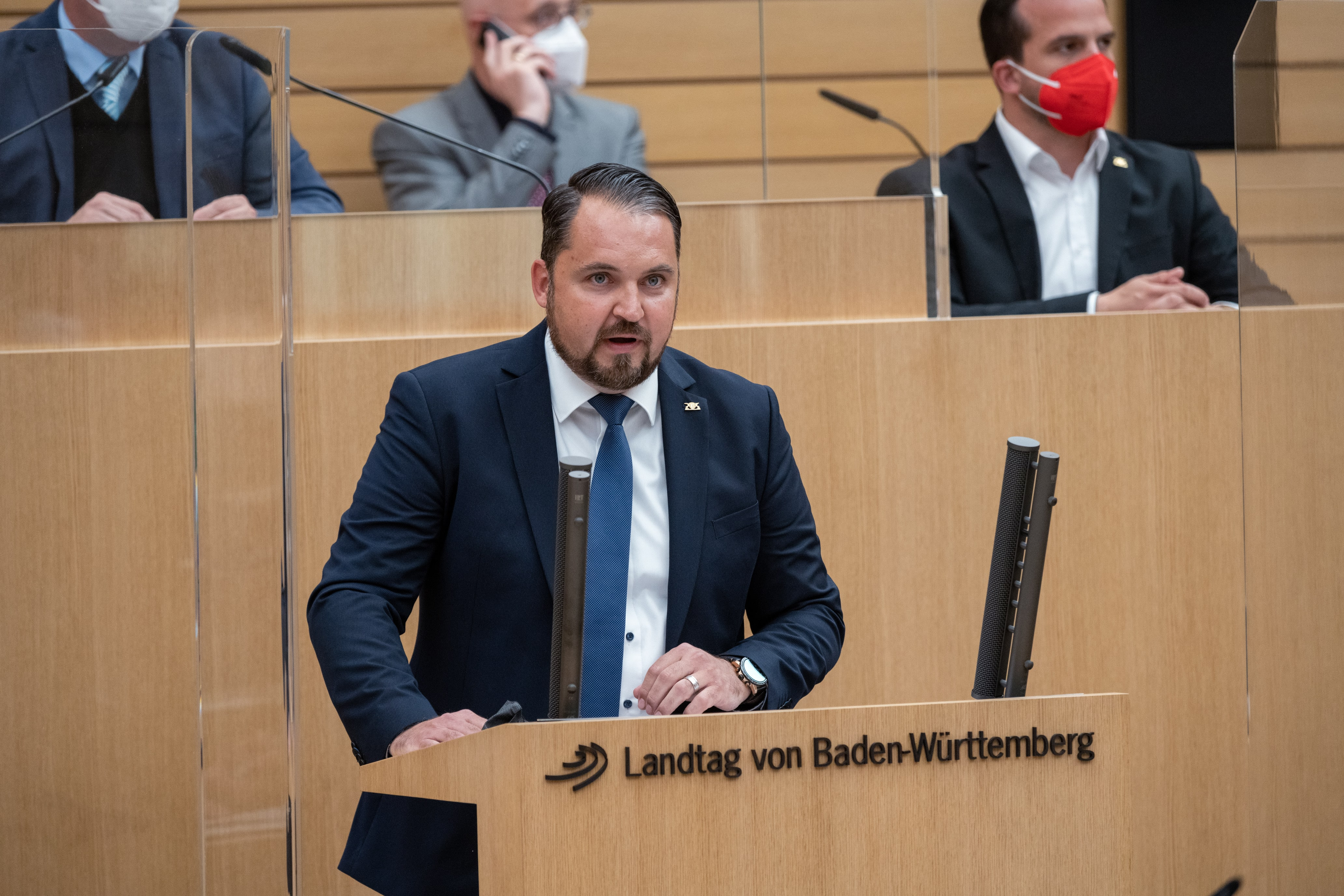
- Gehring in 2021

Member of the Landtag of Baden-Württemberg
- Incumbent
- Assumed office 11 May 2021
- Constituency: Schorndorf

Personal details
- Born: 1 January 1979 (age 47)
- Party: Christian Democratic Union (since 2005)

Christian Gehring (born 1 January 1979) is a German politician serving as a member of the Landtag of Baden-Württemberg since 2021. He has been a municipal councillor of Kernen since 2024.
