= Stephan Schwarz (politician, born 1984) =

German politician (born 1984)

Member of the Landtag of Baden-Württemberg
- Incumbent
- Assumed office 11 May 2026

Personal details
- Born: 8 September 1984 (age 41)
- Party: Alternative for Germany

Stephan Alexander Schwarz (born 8 September 1984) is a German politician who was elected member of the Landtag of Baden-Württemberg in 2026. He has been designated to serve as a deputy group leader of the Alternative for Germany.
