= Werkrealschule =

Werkrealschule is a relatively young branch of German secondary education (e.g. in Baden-Württemberg), which offers pupils additional lessons in grades 8 and 9 and allows them to qualify after a decade with a final exam which is equal to graduation from Realschule.
