= Plüderhausen =

- Municipality
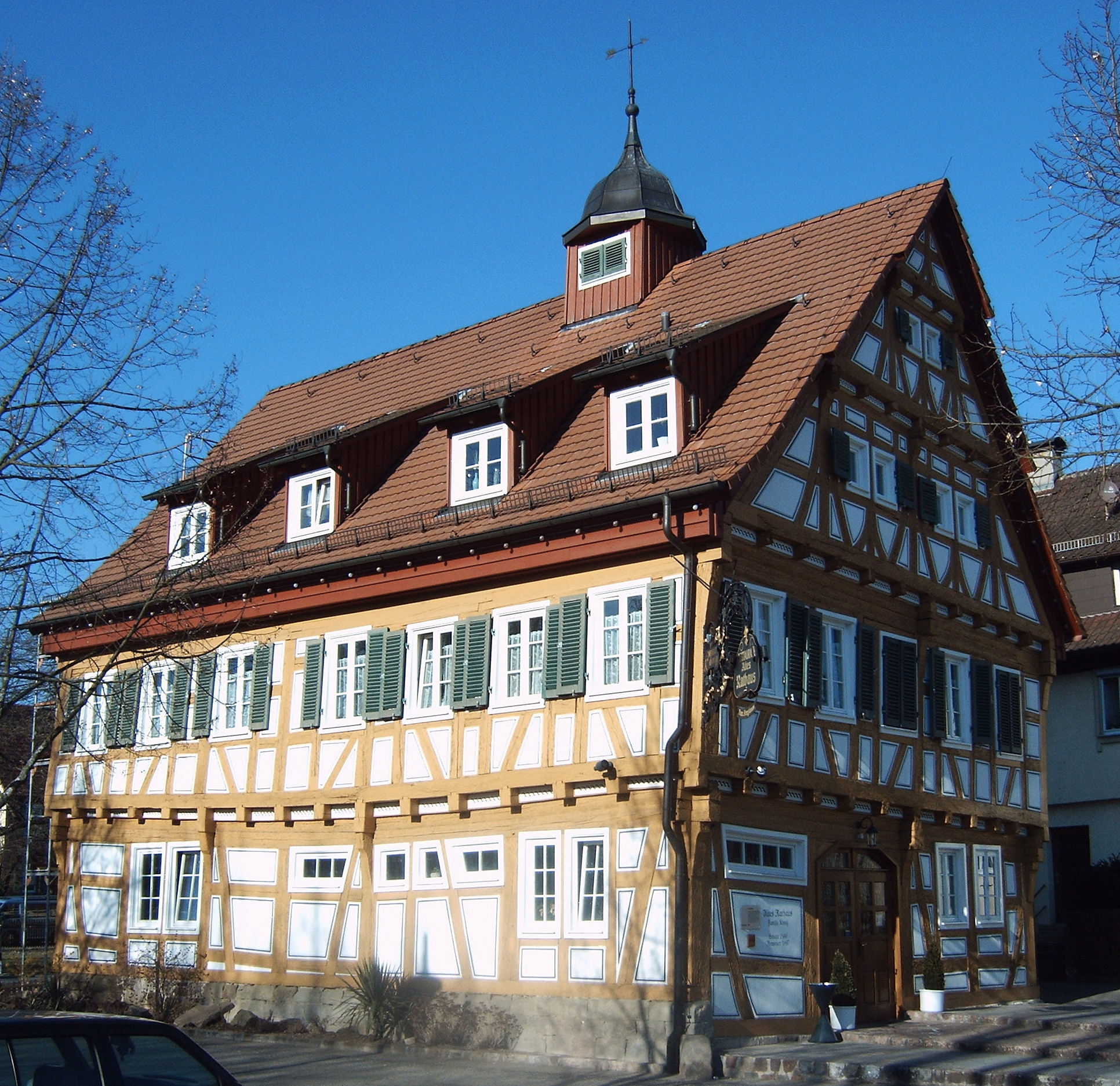
- Old town hall, built in 1569

- Coat of arms

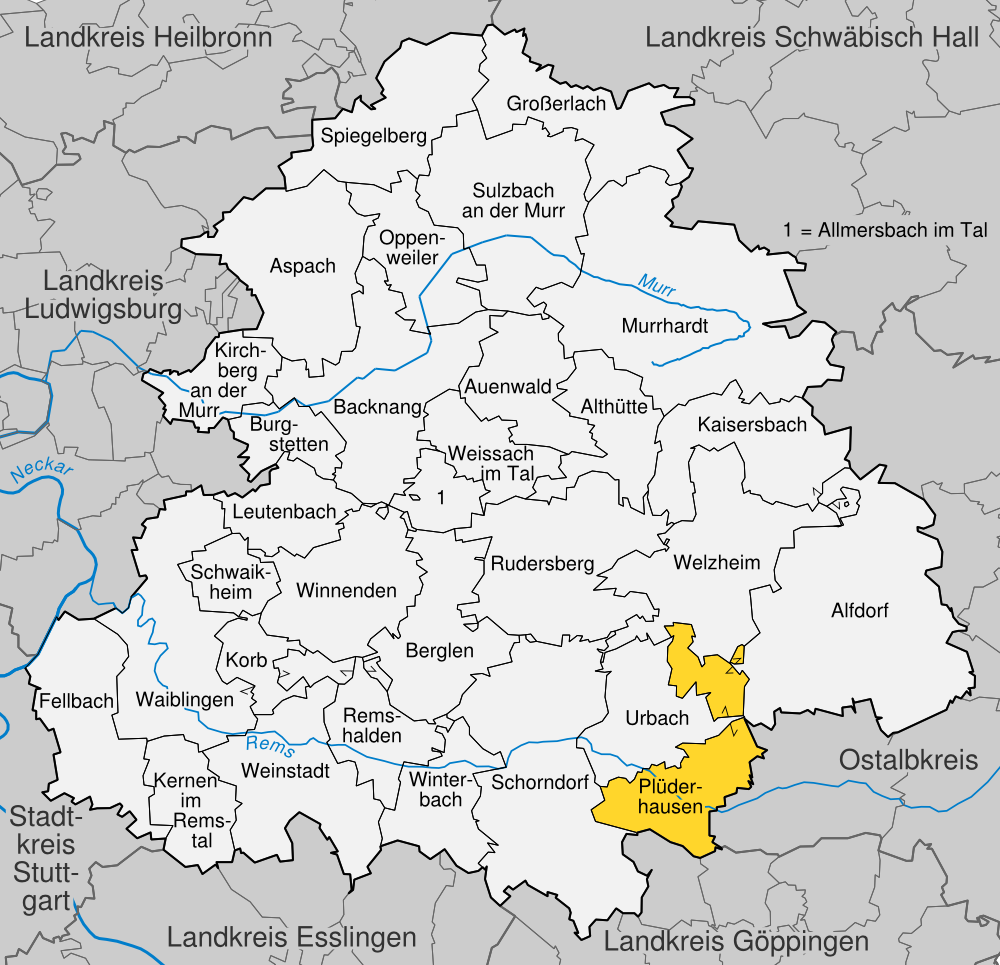
- Location of Plüderhausen within Rems-Murr-Kreis district
- Interactive map of Plüderhausen
- Location within Germany Location within Baden-Württemberg
- Coordinates: 48°47′42″N 09°36′04″E
- Country: Germany
- State: Baden-Württemberg
- Admin. region: Stuttgart
- District: Rems-Murr-Kreis

Government
  - Mayor (2021–29): Benjamin Treiber

Area
  - Total: 26.13 km^{2} (10.09 sq mi)
- Elevation: 274 m (899 ft)

Population (2025-12-31)
  - Total: 9,755
  - Density: 373.3/km^{2} (966.9/sq mi)
- Time zone: UTC+01:00 (CET)
  - Summer (DST): UTC+02:00 (CEST)
- Postal codes: 73655
- Dialling codes: 07181
- Vehicle registration: WN
- Website: www.pluederhausen.de

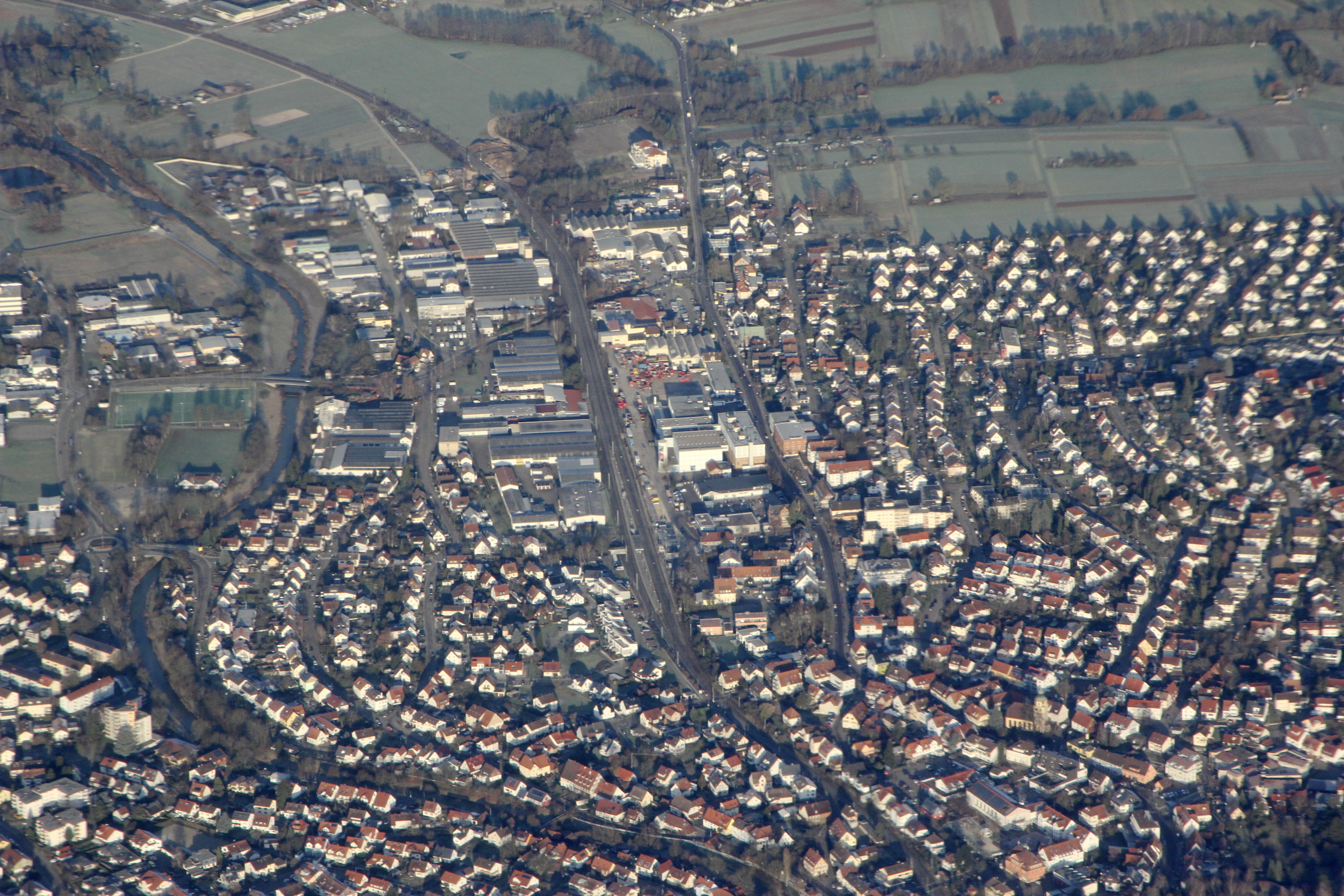
Aerial picture of Plüderhausen

Plüderhausen is a municipality east of Schorndorf in the Rems-Murr district in Baden-Württemberg, Germany. It belongs to the Stuttgart Metropolitan Region.

== Geography ==
The municipality of Plüderhausen lies in the Rems Valley, nestled between the heights of the Schurwald and the Welzheimer Forest at an elevation ranging between 260 and 505 m, with the town center at 274 m.

=== Neighboring towns and municipalities ===
The municipality of Plüderhausen is bordered to the north by Welzheim, to the east by Waldhausen (Lorch), to the southeast by Börtlingen, to the south by Adelberg, to the west by Schorndorf, and to the northwest by Urbach.

=== Community structure ===
The municipality of Plüderhausen consists of the villages of Plüderhausen and Walkersbach, the hamlet of Aichenbachhof, and the smaller communities of Eibenhof, Köshof, Neuweilerhof, Plüderwiesenhof and Schautenhof. The abandoned villages of Linthalten, Neuweiler und Tannschöpflenshof are also located within the municipal boundaries. The municipality is additionally divided into the two residential districts of Plüderhausen (with Plüderhausen, Plüderwiesenhof, Aichenbachhof and Neuweilerhof) and Walkersbach (with Walkersbach, Schautenhof, Köshof und Eibenhof).

A narrow wedge of the Urbach district, which extends northeast to the Walkersbach valley, divides the municipality of Plüderhausen into a larger southern part around Plüderhausen village and a smaller northern part around Walkersbach village. Additionally, there is a very small municipal exclave around Schautenhof north of Walkersbach.

== Development of the municipal district ==
=== Incorporations ===
- Aichenbachhof, Walkersbach

=== Population growth ===
Year	Population
1630	1825
1655	600
1825	1800
1871	1725
1890	1816
1900	1788
1910	2038
1925	2373
1939	2579
1950	2724
1961	4088
1970	5545

Year	Population
1975	7108
1976	7704
1985	8422
1990	9187
1995	9332
2000	9549
2005	9585
2008	9679

== History ==
In the earliest known documentary record from 1142, Plüderhausen was referred to as "Pliderhusen," a name derived from the Old High German blidheri, which roughly means "happy army." During the Hohenstaufen Dynasty Plüderhausen came under the authority of the Hohenstaufen Ministeriales based in Elisabethenberg bei Waldhausen. From 1246 Plüderhausen was governed by the Dukes of Württemberg, under the Vogtei of Schorndorf from 1421. The district of Walkersbach was first mentioned in 1262, but is presumably older than the date suggests.

In 1519 Jörg Staufer, a member of the Swabian League, burned down the Plüderhausen church and 80 homes during a military campaign against Duke Ulrich of Württemberg. The church was rebuilt the same year. The Protestant Reformation swept Plüderhausen in 1536. As Prince Elector John Frederick of Saxony initiated his retreat in 1546 after defeat in the Schmalkaldic War, he and his army spent the night of 27–28 November in Plüderhausen, prompting complaints by the Obervogt of Schorndorf about the bad behavior of the robbing and plundering troops.

In 1626 the cemetery was laid out, and is still used today. Many of Plüderhäusen's inhabitants died as a result of the Thirty Years' War, and many fled, so that of the approximately 1,800 inhabitants at the beginning of the war, only 57 remained at its end. Seven years later there were around 700 inhabitants again. Barely recovered, the town was plundered again by the French under Villars in 1707. From 1793 through 1813 the French Revolutionary Wars and Napoleonic Wars unleashed countless brutal marches of Soldateska through the region.

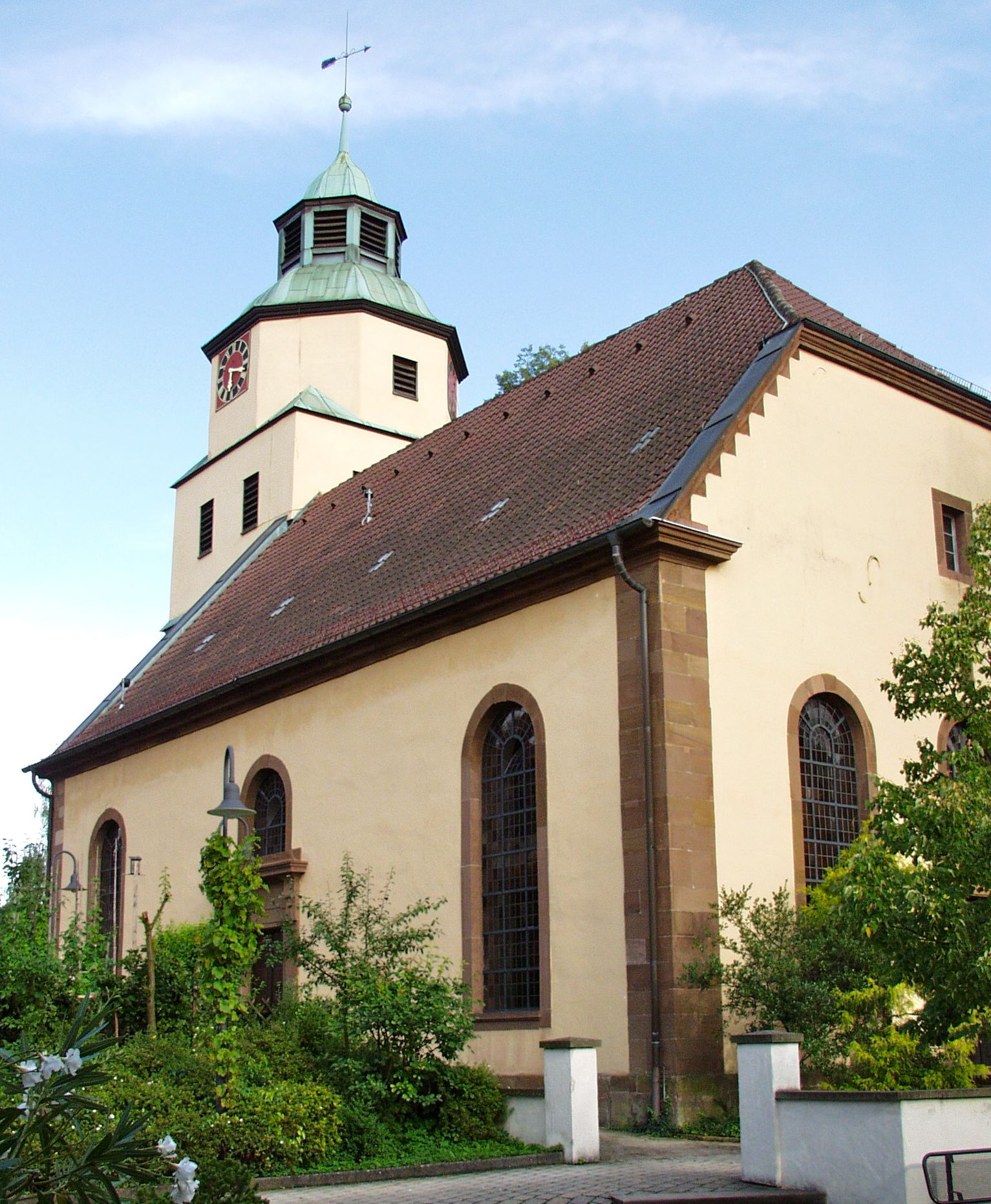
St. Margaret's Evangelical Church from 1804

In 1804 Saint Margaret's Church was built to replace the church rebuilt in 1519; the original choir and tower were preserved. In 1805 Plüderhausen gained market right. In 1807 Walkersbach, which lay about 5 kilometers to the northwest, became a district of Plüderhausen. In a description from 1845, the regional administration of the Welzheim Oberamt noted Plüderhäusen to be an agricultural region and emphasized the importance of the district's fruit-growing. The Cannstatt–Wasseralfingen branch of the Rems Railway provided Plüderhausen with a rail connection in 1861, leading to growing industrialization. In 1863 master baker Jakob Friedrich Schüle began mechanical production of Spätzle and noodles, later establishing a factory Schüle-Hohenlohe AG, for egg dough products.

In 1907 the Castle Garden Elementary School was built, and the new City Hall was built in 1914.

Plüderhausen was not damaged in World War II, and was surrendered to the United States Army on 20 April 1945 without a struggle.

In 1963 the first annual Plüderhäuser Festival Days took place.

== Religion ==
There has been a church in Plüderhausen since 1295. It was originally dedicated to Peter and Paul, then to St. Margaret since 1537. The present evangelical Church of St. Margaret was built in the 15th century. The evangelical church congregation belonged to the Welzheim church district until its 1978 dissolution. Ever since the congregation belongs to the Schorndorf district.

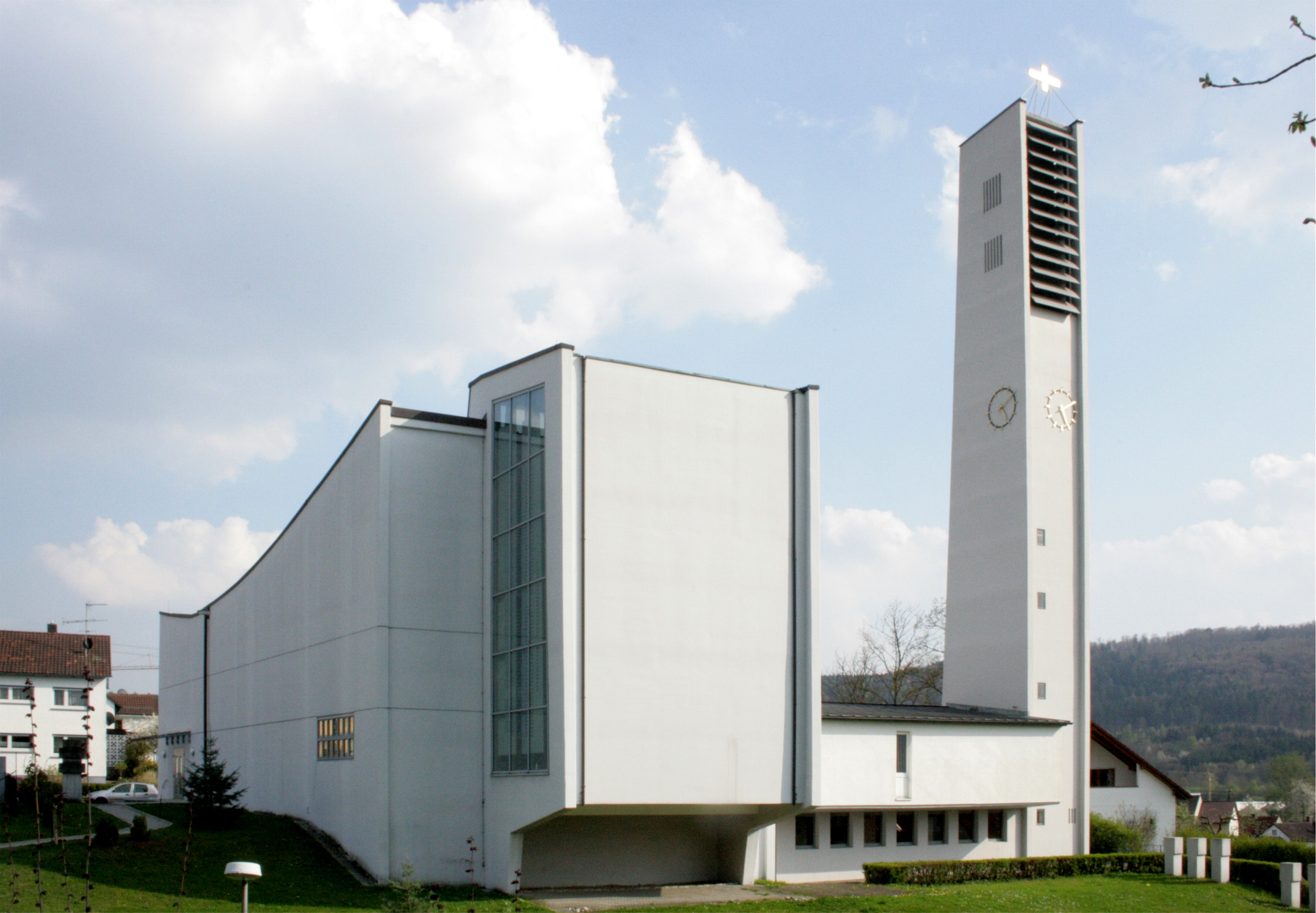
Catholic Sacred Heart Church (2010)

There are 7 churches in Plüderhausen today:

- the Evangelical Church of St. Margaret (EKD)
- the Roman Catholic Sacred Heart Church
- the Evangelical Methodist Church (EmK/UMC)
- Church of God - Christian Central Life
- New Apostolic Church
- South German Fellowship
- Peoples' Mission of Decided Christians.

== Personality ==
- The Austrian jazz musician Oscar Klein (1930–2006) lived most recently in Plüderhausen.
- Dieter Kleinmann (born 1953), Member of Parliament (FDP), grew up in Plüderhausen and was here alderman.

=== Sons and daughters of the town ===
- Sixt Jacob von Kapff (1735–1821), lawyer and professor in Tübingen
- Erich Retter (1925–2014), football player
- Joachim Speidel (born 1947), electrical engineer, professor of communication at the University of Stuttgart
