= Kaisersbach =

- Municipality
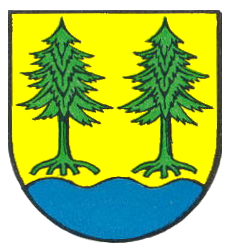
- Coat of arms

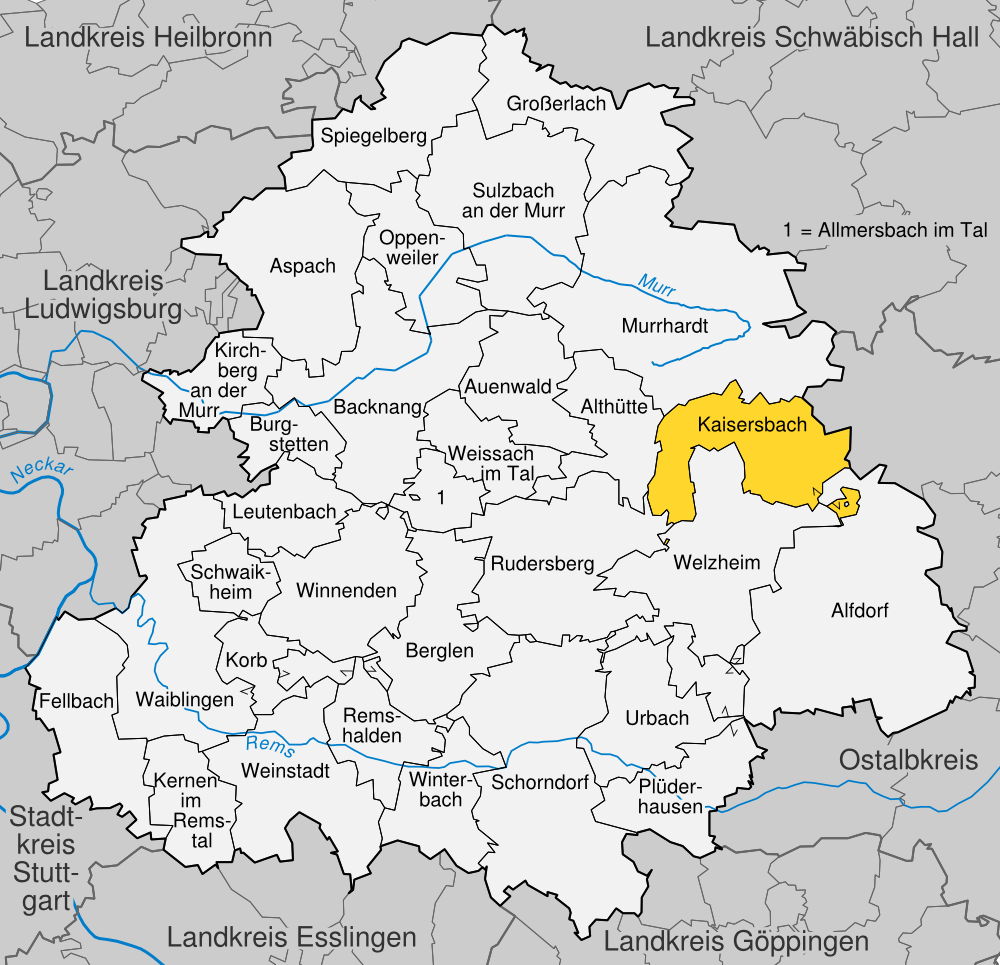
- Location of Kaisersbach within Rems-Murr-Kreis district
- Interactive map of Kaisersbach
- Location within Germany Location within Baden-Württemberg
- Coordinates: 48°55′50″N 09°38′21″E
- Country: Germany
- State: Baden-Württemberg
- Admin. region: Stuttgart
- District: Rems-Murr-Kreis

Government
  - Mayor (2021–29): Michael Clauss

Area
  - Total: 27.94 km^{2} (10.79 sq mi)
- Elevation: 565 m (1,854 ft)

Population (2025-12-31)
  - Total: 2,389
  - Density: 85.50/km^{2} (221.5/sq mi)
- Time zone: UTC+01:00 (CET)
  - Summer (DST): UTC+02:00 (CEST)
- Postal codes: 73667
- Dialling codes: 07184
- Vehicle registration: WN
- Website: www.kaisersbach.de

Kaisersbach (German pronunciation: [ˈkaɪ̯zɐsˌbax]) is a municipality in the district of Rems-Murr in Baden-Württemberg in Germany.

== Demographics ==
Population development:

Year	Inhabitants
1990	2,399
2001	2,698
2011	2,535
2021	2,448

== Points of interest ==
- Schwabenpark, an amusement park in Gmeinweiler village, which belongs to Kaiserbach.
