= Rems (river) =

River in Germany

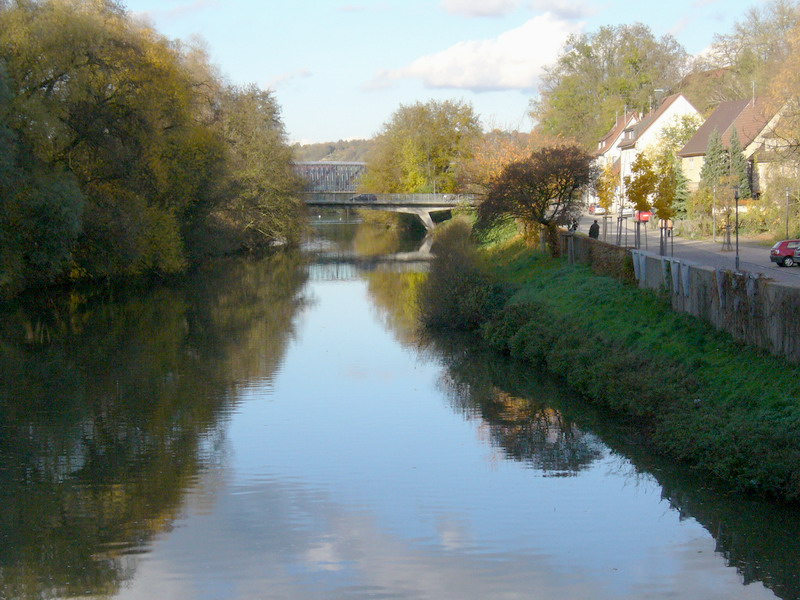
- Remseck

Location
- Country: Germany

Physical characteristics
- Source
  - location: Swabian Jura
- Mouth
  - location: Neckar
  - coordinates: 48°52′25″N 9°16′29″E
- Length: 78.5 km (48.8 mi)
- Basin size: 583 km^{2} (225 sq mi)

Basin features
- Progression: Neckar→ Rhine→ North Sea

The Rems (German pronunciation: [ʁɛms]) is a right tributary of the Neckar in eastern Baden-Württemberg, Germany. It is 78 km long. It upsprings at Essingen, near Aalen. It flows more or less west through the towns Böbingen an der Rems, Schwäbisch Gmünd, Lorch, Plüderhausen, Schorndorf, Remshalden and Waiblingen. At Remseck the Rems flows into the Neckar.
