= Remshalden =

- Municipality
- Coat of arms

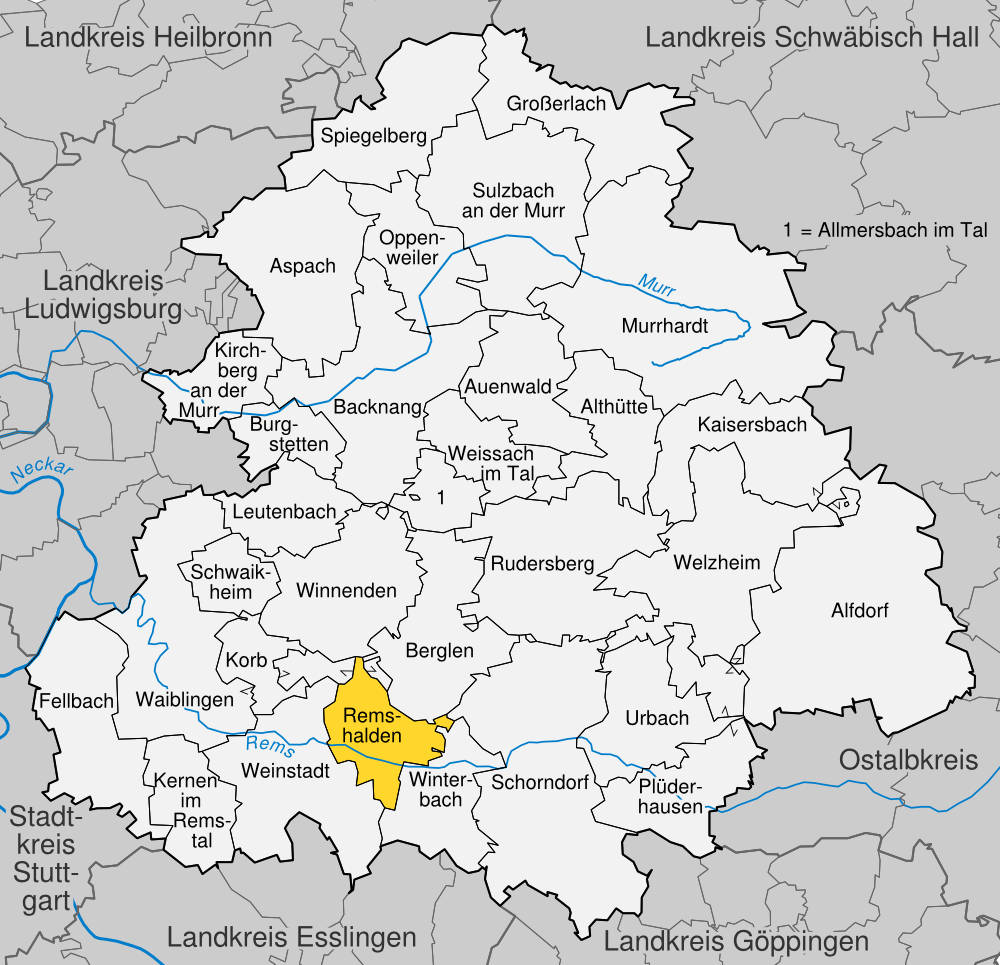
- Location of Remshalden within Rems-Murr-Kreis district
- Interactive map of Remshalden
- Location within Germany Location within Baden-Württemberg
- Coordinates: 48°48′52″N 09°25′15″E
- Country: Germany
- State: Baden-Württemberg
- Admin. region: Stuttgart
- District: Rems-Murr-Kreis
- Subdivisions: 5 Ortsteile

Government
  - Mayor (2018–26): Reinhard Molt

Area
  - Total: 15.15 km^{2} (5.85 sq mi)
- Elevation: 271 m (889 ft)

Population (2025-12-31)
  - Total: 14,291
  - Density: 943.3/km^{2} (2,443/sq mi)
- Time zone: UTC+01:00 (CET)
  - Summer (DST): UTC+02:00 (CEST)
- Postal codes: 73630
- Dialling codes: 07151, 07181
- Vehicle registration: WN
- Website: www.remshalden.de

Remshalden is a municipality in the Rems-Murr district of Baden-Württemberg, Germany, in the Stuttgart region. It lies in the Remstal (Rems valley) along the Bundesstraße 29 between Waiblingen and Schorndorf.

== Geography ==
Remshalden is situated about 18 km east of Stuttgart and 8 km east of Waiblingen on the river Rems. The municipality comprises the five districts (Ortsteile) Buoch, Geradstetten, Grunbach, Hebsack and Rohrbronn.

== History ==
The present municipality of Remshalden was created in the course of the Baden-Württemberg municipal reform: on 1 January 1972 Buoch was incorporated into Grunbach, and Hebsack and Rohrbronn into Geradstetten; on 1 October 1974 Grunbach and Geradstetten merged to form Remshalden.

== Government ==
=== Municipal council ===
At the municipal election held on 9 June 2024 the 22 seats were distributed as follows: BWV 8 seats (36.2%), CDU 5 (24.2%), SPD 3 (13.9%), Greens 3 (13.5%), FDP/FW 3 (12.2%). Voter turnout was 66.8%.

The mayor since 2018 is Reinhard Molt (term 2018–2026).

== Transport ==
Remshalden lies on the four-lane B 29 trunk road between Waiblingen and Schorndorf with signed exits for Remshalden-Grunbach and Remshalden-Geradstetten. It is served by the Stuttgart S-Bahn line S2 (Schorndorf–Stuttgart–Flughafen/Messe–Filderstadt) at the stations Grunbach and Geradstetten.

Cycling connections include the Remstal-Radweg, a state long-distance cycle route along the Rems valley.

== Twin towns ==
Remshalden is twinned with:

- Gournay-en-Bray, France (since 1989/1990)
- Etyek, Hungary (since 1994/1995)
- Elterlein, Germany (official since 2003)

== Economy ==
Companies based in Remshalden include (selection):

- Klingele Paper & Packaging – group headquarters and corrugated board plant in Remshalden-Grunbach (Alfred-Klingele-Straße 56–76).
- BRAWA (model railways) – company site and contact in Remshalden.
- Frigeo (Ahoj-Brause), part of Katjes – production of the brand’s sherbet products in Remshalden; local entity Frigeo GmbH & Co. KG is registered in Remshalden.
- Schnaithmann Maschinenbau – automation and handling systems manufacturer with headquarters in Remshalden.
- KRAISS & FRIZ – Gase und Technik – industrial gases and technical equipment supplier located in Remshalden.
- Arnold Glas (Arnold Glas Group/Arnold Zentralverwaltungsgesellschaft) – location in Remshalden.

Former companies with sites in Remshalden include:

- Max Holder GmbH – small tractor production at the Grunbach plant (opened 1 July 1949; closed 1986).
- Irmscher Automobilbau – Remshalden facility closed in 2013.

== Education ==
There are two primary schools (Grunbach and Geradstetten) and the Realschule Remshalden in Geradstetten. Further institutions include the construction training centre Bildungszentrum Bau and the IHK Bildungshaus of the Stuttgart Chamber of Commerce and Industry.

== People ==
- Ernst Heinkel (1888–1958), German engineer and aviation pioneer (born in Grunbach)
