= Landkreis Nürtingen =

Nürtingen
- Former county
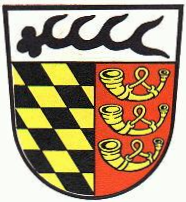
- Coat of arms

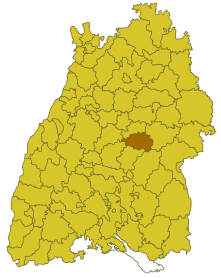
- Coordinates: 48.5833°N 9.4167°E
- Country: Germany
- Federal state: Baden-Württemberg
- Regierungsbezirk: Nordwürttemberg
- Founded: 1938
- Dissolved: 1972-12-31
- Seat of office: Nürtingen

Area
  - Total: 380 km^{2} (150 sq mi)

Population (1970-05-27)
  - Total: 159,030

The district of Nürtingen was a district (Landkreis) in Baden-Württemberg, which was dissolved in the course of the district reform on 1 January 1973.

== Geography ==
=== Location ===
The district Nürtingen was in the middle of Baden-Württemberg.

== History ==
The territory of the district Nürtingen belonged already before 1800 mainly to Württemberg. Therefore, it existed before 1800, the Oberamt Nürtingen and Oberamt Kirchheim. In 1934 the Oberamt offices were renamed to counties and according to the law on the country classification of 24 April 1938, the district Kirchheim was united on 1 October 1938 with the district Nürtingen. For county seat Nürtingen was determined. In 1945, the county Nürtingen came to the newly formed country Württemberg-Baden, which opened in 1952 in the state Baden-Württemberg. With effect from 1 January 1973 the district Nürtingen was dissolved. Its communities went almost entirely to the new district of Esslingen. The municipality Grafenberg however came to the district of Reutlingen.

== Towns and municipalities ==
Former municipality	Today municipality	Residents on 6. June 1961	Residents on 27. May 1970
Aich	Aichtal	1.600	2.453
Altdorf	533	710	
Altenriet	Altenriet	693	916
Bempflingen	Bempflingen	1.961	2.363
Beuren	Beuren	2.569	2.864
Bissingen an der Teck	Bissingen an der Teck	1.899	2.330
Dettingen unter Teck	Dettingen unter Teck	3.616	4.047
Erkenbrechtsweiler	Erkenbrechtsweiler	1.314	1.446
Frickenhausen	Frickenhausen	3.363	4.487
Grafenberg	Grafenberg	1.284	1.592
Großbettlingen	Großbettlingen	1.413	2.434
Grötzingen	Aichtal	1.862	2.224
Gutenberg	Lenningen	664	692
Hardt	Nürtingen	328	480
Hepsisau	Weilheim an der Teck	734	759
Holzmaden	Holzmaden	1.290	1.520
Jesingen	Kirchheim unter Teck	2.161	2.364
Kappishäusern	Neuffen	371	453
Kirchheim unter Teck, Große Kreisstadt	Kirchheim unter Teck	25.007	28.842
Kleinbettlingen	Bempflingen	223	294
Kohlberg	Kohlberg	1.504	1.753
Linsenhofen	Frickenhausen	1.508	1.815
Nabern	Kirchheim unter Teck	853	1.315
Neckarhausen	Nürtingen	2.432	2.876
Neckartailfingen	Neckartailfingen	1.842	2.772
Neckartenzlingen	Neckartenzlingen	3.162	4.914
Neidlingen	Neidlingen	1.151	1.387
Neuenhaus	Aichtal	1.413	1.767
Neuffen, Stadt	Neuffen	3.801	4.446
Notzingen	Notzingen	1.892	2.215
Nürtingen, Große Kreisstadt	Nürtingen	20.505	21.191
Oberboihingen	Oberboihingen	3.039	3.810
Oberlenningen	Lenningen	2.926	3.279
Ochsenwang	Bissingen an der Teck	274	253
Ohmden	Ohmden	1.026	1.249
Owen, Stadt	Owen	2.432	2.685
Raidwangen	Nürtingen	712	1.190
Reudern	Nürtingen	1.273	1.760
Schlaitdorf	Schlaitdorf	834	995
Schlattstall	Lenningen	178	177
Schopfloch	Lenningen	704	655
Tischardt	Frickenhausen	654	977
Unterensingen	Unterensingen	2.101	3.303
Unterlenningen	Lenningen	2.388	2.864
Weilheim an der Teck, Stadt	Weilheim an der Teck	5.787	6.684
Wendlingen am Neckar, Stadt	Wendlingen am Neckar	10.087	13.666
Wolfschlugen	Wolfschlugen	2.689	3.547
Zizishausen	Nürtingen	1.568	2.185

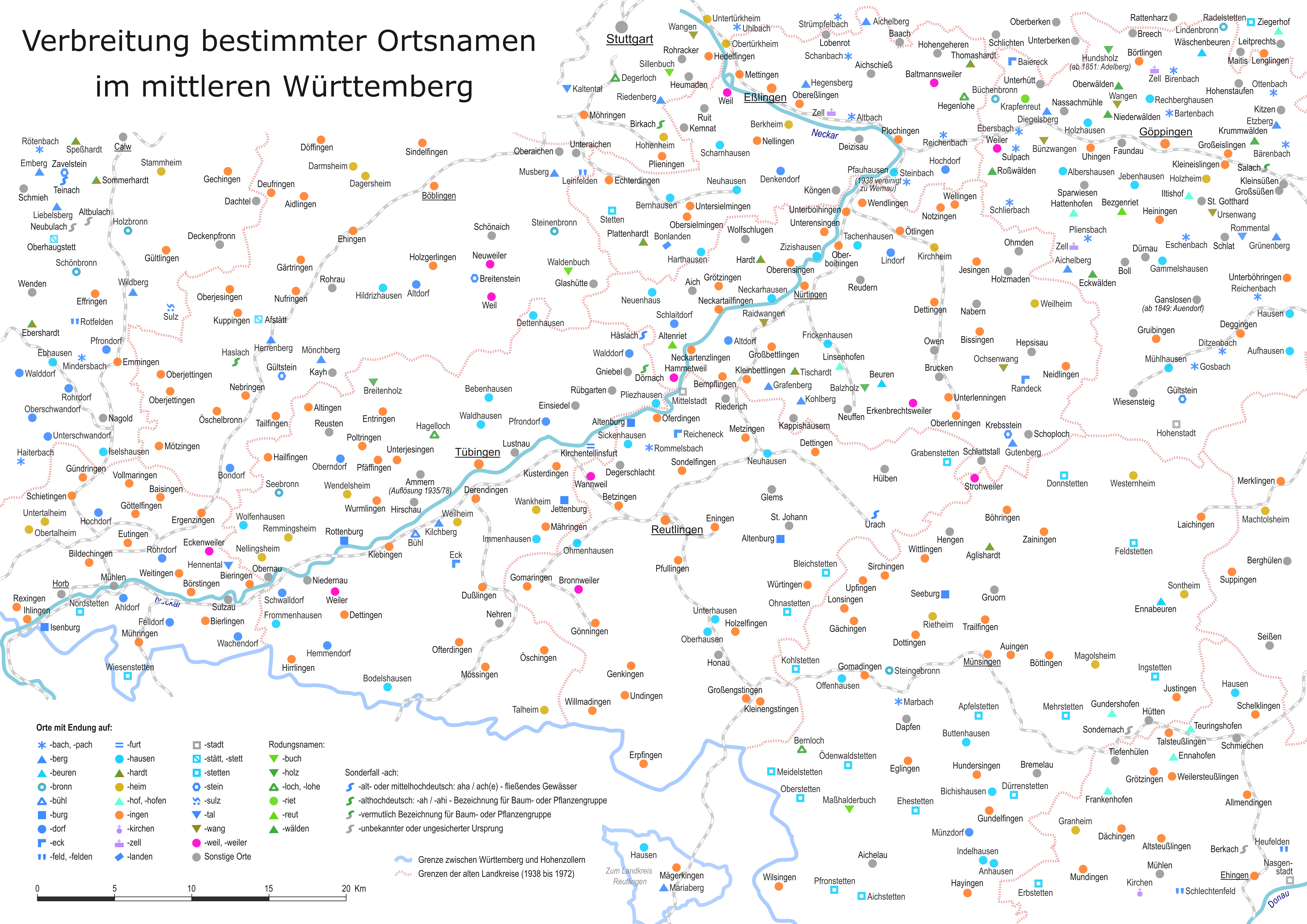
Place names in the former Landkreis Nürtingen and surrounding districts.
