= Kirchheim (Teck) station =

Railway station in Kirchheim unter Teck, Germany

Kirchheim (Teck)
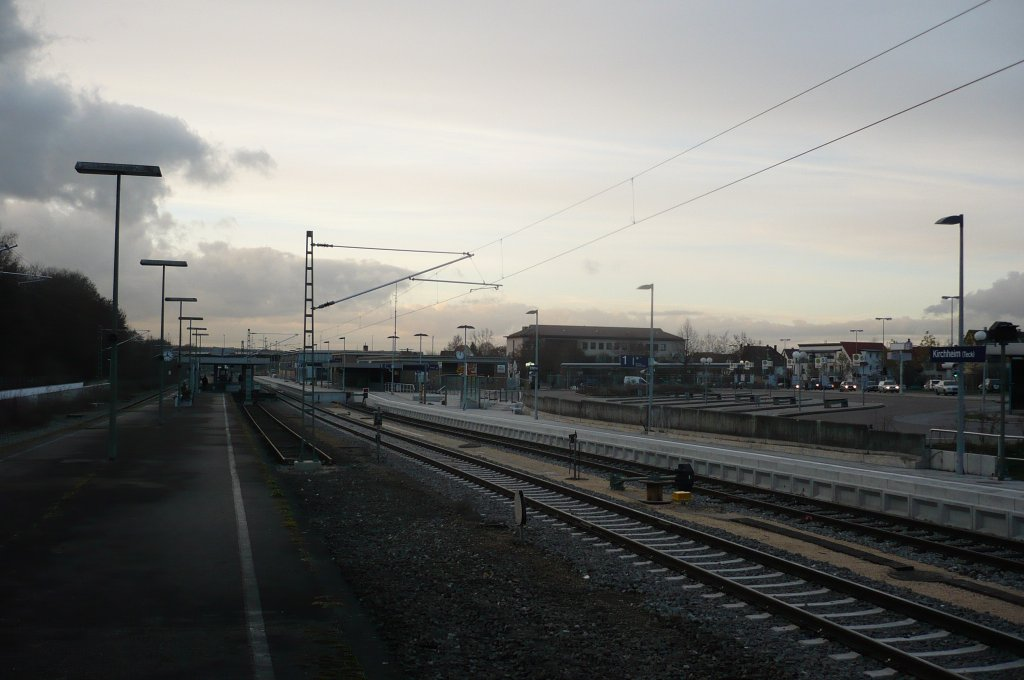
- Kirchheim station during the reconstruction for the S-Bahn in 2009

General information
- Location: Eugen-Gerstenmaier-Platz 1, Kirchheim unter Teck, Baden-Württemberg; Germany
- Coordinates: 48°38′41″N 9°26′26″E
- Owner: Deutsche Bahn
- Operator: DB Netz; DB Station&Service
- Lines: Teck Railway (km 6.465) (KBS 790.81 / 790.1)
- Platforms: 2

Construction
- Accessible: No

Other information
- Station code: 3194
- DS100 code: TKT
- IBNR: 8003280
- Category: 4
- Fare zone: : 5
- Website: www.bahnhof.de

History
- Opened: 21 September 1864 (first station); 1 October 1899 (second station); 26 September 1975 (current station)
- Closed: 1 October 1899 (first station); 26 September 1975 (second station)

Services
Preceding station	DB Regio Baden-Württemberg	Following station
Terminus	RB 64	Kirchheim (Teck) Süd towards Oberlenningen
Preceding station	Stuttgart S-Bahn	Following station
Kirchheim (Teck)-Ötlingen towards Herrenberg	S1	Terminus
Location

Kirchheim (Teck) station (1864–1899: Kirchheim u Teck) is the most important station of the Baden-Württemberg town Kirchheim unter Teck. Today's train station is at kilometer 6.465 of the Teck Railway between Wendlingen (Neckar) and Oberlenningen. It is served by the Stuttgart S-Bahn S1 line and the regional train line R81.

== History ==
The 6.11 kilometers long stretch from Unterboihingen (today Wendlingen) via Ötlingen to Kirchheim (Teck) was finished on 21 September 1864. It was the first private railway taken into operationin Württemberg. It was operated by the Kirchheimer Eisenbahn Gesellschaft. On 1 January 1899 the Royal Württemberg State Railways took over the rail network and extended it on October 1 of the same year to Oberlenningen (nowadays district of Lenningen). On 15 September 1908 the Royal Württemberg State Railways opened the branch line from Kirchheim (Teck) South to Weilheim (Teck) On 26 September 1975 the new station was opened further south in Kirchheim. The old station was demolished and a shopping center (Teckcenter) was built on the former site. On 25 September 1982 the mode of transport from Kirchheim to Weilheim (Teck) was changed from train to bus. The freight transport service on the Holzmaden-Weilheim section was stopped around 1985. On 1 August 1995 the remaining Kirchheim-Holzmaden section was closed. On 12 December 2009 the S 1 of the Stuttgart S-Bahn stopped in Kirchheim for the first time. Kirchheim is nowadays connected to the rail network by the Teckbahn, leading from Wendlingen to Oberlenningen. This line is integrated in the network of the Stuttgart-S-Bahn till Kirchheim. On the Kirchheim-Oberlenningen section regional trains of line R81 are in operation.

== Trains ==
=== Regional ===
Line	Track
RB 64	Kirchheim (Teck) – Kirchheim (Teck) Süd – Dettingen (Teck) – Owen (Teck) – Brucken – Unterlenningen – Oberlenningen

=== S-Bahn ===
Line	Track
S 1	Kirchheim (Teck) – Wendlingen – Plochingen – Esslingen – Stuttgart Neckarpark – Stuttgart–Bad Cannstatt – Stuttgart Hbf – Stuttgart Schwabstraße – Stuttgart-Vaihingen – Stuttgart-Rohr – Böblingen – Herrenberg

== Buses ==
The central bus (ZOB) station with nine platforms is adjacent to the station.

== Literature ==
- Peter-Michael Mihailescu; Matthias Michalke (1985). Vergessene Bahnen in Baden-Württemberg [Forgotten tracks in Baden-Württemberg] (in German). Stuttgart: Konrad Theiss Verlag. pp. 197–200. ISBN 3-8062-0413-6.
