= Stuttgart Region =

Urban agglomeration in the Stuttgart Metropolitan Region

Coordinates: 48°47′00″N 9°10′35″E

Stuttgart Region Region Stuttgart
- Urban agglomeration
- Coat of arms
- Interactive map of Stuttgart Region
- Country: Germany
- State: Baden-Württemberg
- Regierungsbezirk: Stuttgart
- Metropolitan region: Stuttgart
- Established: 7 February 1994

Government
  - Body: Verband Region Stuttgart
  - Chairman: Rainer Wieland (CDU)
  - Regional Director: Alexander Lahl

Population
  - Total: 2,700,000
- Website: region-stuttgart.org/en

The Stuttgart Region (German: Region Stuttgart) is an urban agglomeration at the heart of the Stuttgart Metropolitan Region in Baden-Württemberg, Germany. It consists of the city of Stuttgart and the surrounding districts of Ludwigsburg, Esslingen, Böblingen, Rems-Murr and Göppingen (each 10–20 km from Stuttgart city center). About 2.7 million inhabitants live in that area (3,700 km^{2}). In fact, with 708 people per square kilometre, the Stuttgart Region is one of the most densely populated areas in Germany. Stuttgart Region is governed by a directly elected parliament.

Situated at the heart of Baden-Württemberg, the Stuttgart Region is the hub of economic, scientific, and political life in Southwest Germany. The area currently has Germany's highest density of scientific, academic and research organisations, and tops the national league for patent applications.

== Geography ==
From northwest to southeast the region is 90 kilometers long and from southwest to northeast 80 kilometers. The size of the area is 3.654 km^{2}. According to calculations made by the land surveying office, the geographical center is located in the south of the district Rems-Murr a few hundred meters east from the village Weinstadt-Strümpfelbach in a vineyard. An erratic placed after the vine field reform - the so-called Vogelstein - lays by accident almost exactly in that center.

The Neckar flows through the region for about 90 kilometers, of which about 70 kilometers are navigable waterway. The longest tributary in the region is the Fils (50 km), followed by Murr (45 km), the Rems (35 km) and the Enz (30 km).

Topographically the Region lays between 170 m above sea level (Neckar near Kirchheim am Neckar) and 835 m above sea level (swabian albs plateau near Hohenstadt).

== Demographics ==
About 2.7 million people live in the Stuttgart Region, which corresponds to a quarter of the entire population of Baden-Württemberg at about on tenth of its size. 749 people/km^{2} is the regions average population density.

The numbers of inhabitants are census results (¹) or official updates of the statistical state office of Baden-Württemberg (only primary residence).

Date	Inhabitants
31 December 1973	2,373,268
31 December 1975	2,341,099
31 December 1980	2,369,273
31 December 1985	2,348,272
25 May 1987 ¹	2,361,412
31 December 1990	2,484,360

Date	Inhabitants
31 December 1995	2,566,950
31 December 2000	2,613,379
31 December 2005	2,667,766
31 December 2010	2,678,795
9 May 2011 ¹	2,626,864
31 December 2015	2,735,425

== Verband Region Stuttgart ==
The Verband Region Stuttgart (VRS) a public body, is as one of 12 regional associations in Baden-Württemberg political and administrative instance of the Stuttgart Region. Its predecessor is the Regionalverband Mittlerer Neckar founded in 1973 which was renamed to Regionalverband Stuttgart in 1992. By law it was transferred into the Verband Region Stuttgart on February, 7th 1994. Thereby the new association besides the regional planning, received additional tasks and has as the only regional association in Baden-Württemberg a directly elected parliament. The regional assembly of the Verband Region Stuttgart is elected every five years.

Further association bodies besides the regional assembly are the honorary chairman elected by the assembly out of its members for 5 years and the regional director elected for 8 years who is temporary full-time public official. The regional director represents the association and leads the Administration. His office is located in the associations office in Stuttgart. The association additionally has an office in Brussels.

The Budget of the VRS for 2016 was 389 million Euro (2015: 323 million Euro).

=== Tasks ===
Important compulsory tasks of the VRS are amongst others:

- regional spatial planning (regional planning)
- regional transportation planning and public transport
- regional economic promotion

==== Spatial Planning ====
The VRS is the representative for the regional spatial planning (regional planning). Most important tool herefore is the regional plan according to § 9 ROG. This plan names the following central places.

Regional Centers
Stuttgart	Stuttgart Central
	Bad Cannstatt (core city)
	Feuerbach (core city)
	Vaihingen (core city)
	Weilimdorf (core city)
	Zuffenhausen (core City)

Medium Centers
Backnang
Bietigheim-Bissingen (district Bietigheim), Besigheim
Böblingen, Sindelfingen
Esslingen am Neckar
Geislingen an der Steige
Göppingen
Herrenberg
Kirchheim unter Teck
Leonberg
Ludwigsburg, Kornwestheim
Nürtingen
Schorndorf
Vaihingen an der Enz
Waiblingen, Fellbach

Sub Center
Ditzingen
Donzdorf
Filderstadt (district Bernhausen)
Leinfelden-Echterdingen (districts Leinfelden and Echterdingen)
Marbach am Neckar
Murrhardt
Ostfildern (district Nellingen)
Plochingen
Weil der Stadt
Weinstadt (district Endersbach)
Welzheim
Winnenden

Small Centers
Alfdorf (main town)
Bad Boll (main town)
Böhmenkirch (main town)
Bönnigheim (central city)
Deggingen (main town)
Ebersbach an der Fils (central city)
Eislingen/Fils (central city)
Freiberg am Neckar (central city)
Gäufelden (district Nebringen)
Gerlingen (central city)
Großbottwar (central city), Oberstenfeld (main town)
Holzgerlingen (central city)
Korntal-Münchingen (district Korntal)
Lenningen (districtl Oberlenningen)
Neckartenzlingen (main town)
Neuffen (central city)
Plüderhausen (main town)
Rechberghausen (main town)
Reichenbach an der Fils (central city)
Remshalden (central city)
Renningen (central city)
Rudersberg (main town)
Sachsenheim (central city Großsachsenheim)
Steinheim an der Murr (central city)
Sulzbach an der Murr (main town)
Uhingen (main town)
Waldenbuch (main town)
Weilheim an der Teck (central city)
Wendlingen am Neckar (central city)
Wiesensteig (central City)

==== Transport ====
The VRS is responsible for the regional transport planning and the regional significant local public transport. In the regional transport plan it makes forecasts of the traffic development for longer periods of time and names and evaluates urgent measures to cope with traffic. The VRS is sponsor of the S-Bahn Stuttgart and stakeholder of the Verkehrs- und Tarifverbund Stuttgart (VVS). Moreover, he co-finances Stuttgart 21.

Out of the 323 million Euro in the budget of 2015, 300.4 million Euro went to the transport budget. Of those, 80.5 Million Euro was for the operation of the S-Bahn, the Schuster and the small Teckbahn.

According to a financing agreement the VRS receives for the S-Bahn Stuttgart 9,1 % of the states regionalization budget from 2018 until 2031, 88 million Euro in 2018.

==== Economic promotion ====
In order to exercise as required by law, the regionally important task of economic promotion, the VRS founded together with other Stakeholders the die Wirtschaftsförderung Region Stuttgart GmbH (in 1995). Besides the recruitment and the guidance of companies which want to locate in the Stuttgart Region (Exogenic economic promotion) the about 50 employees of WRS consult and assist within the scope of site development already locally based companies (endogenous economic promotion).

Besides the classical economic promotion in the narrower sense (e.g. through the marketing of industry sites, guidance of investors at their search for a location as well as location marketing) one focus is on the economic promotion activities of the Stuttgart Region and the Support of certain business clusters. Amongst others.:

- Automotive industry and engineering
- Mechanical Engineering, Manufacturing Engineering
- Energy and Environmental Engineering
- Information Technology (especially in the field of Open-Source-Software)
- Health based economy
- Aerospace Engineering
- Cultural industry

In order to support these Clusters, the WRS initiates, coordinates and mentors the WRS branch networks (e.g. the Clusterinitiative Automotive CARS, the MedienInitiative Region Stuttgart or the Initiative Open Source Region Stuttgart), organises Symposiums (as for example the annual fuel cell congress f-cell) and gathers and publishes a variety of branch information.

In order to promote the employer attractiveness of the regions small and medium-sized employers to the pupils, students and graduates, the Wirtschaftsförderung Region Stuttgart GmbH hosts an online Stuttgart Region employer directory. There organizations have the possibility to present themselves and their current offers for junior employees.

In order to improve the knowledge transfer and contacts between industry and science, 15 competence and Innovation Centers have been established in the Region within which organisations, universities and research facilities work together interdisciplinary on industries related projects. Examples for such competence and Innovation Centers are the Virtual Dimension Center (VDC, competence Center for virtual reality in Fellbach), the Kompetenznetzwerk Mechatronik in Göppingen, the Packaging Excellence Center (PEC, competence Center for packaging and automation technology) in Waiblingen or the Software center Böblingen/Sindelfingen.

Further activities aim at the supply of skilled employees (for example through advancing the compatibility of family and careers and model projects on professional development). As well as the support of company foundations (for example through the partner network Partnernetz für Unternehmensgründungen aus Stuttgarter Hochschulen (PUSH) or the agency of founders and private Investors; see also Business Angels). In order to sponsor the music and film industry the Region has established two separate institutions: The Film Commission Region Stuttgart and the Popbüro Region Stuttgart.

=== Honorary Chairmans ===
The designations were: 1974–1994 „Vorsitzender des Regionalverbands Mittlerer Neckar“ respectively „Vorsitzender des Regionalverbands Stuttgart“; since 1994 „Vorsitzender des Verbands Region Stuttgart“.

- March 1974 until 1 October 1994: Walter Hirrlinger (former Minister of Labour)
- 19 October 1994 until 29 March 1995: Hans Jochen Henke (Lord Mayor City of Ludwigsburg)
- 29 March 1995 until 26 June 1996: Wolfgang Rückert (former mayor)
- 26 June 1996 until 7 December 1999: Eberhardt Palmer
- 7 December 1999 until 21 August 2000: Helmut Xander
- 21 August 2000 until 20 September 2000 Peter Hofelich (temporary after the step-down of Helmut Xander)
- 20 September 2000 until 31 Dezember 2006: Jürgen Fritz
- since 1 January 2007 and reelected for 5 years on 16 September 2009: Thomas Bopp

=== Regional Directors ===
The designations were: 1974–1994 Verbandsdirektor des Regionalverbands Mittlerer Neckar respectively Verbandsdirektor des Regionalverbands Stuttgart; since 1994 Regionaldirektor des Verbands Region Stuttgart.

- 1 February 1974 until 1 October 1994: Erich Stoll
- 1 October 1994 until 25 September 2008: Bernd Steinacher (1956–2008)
- 1 July 2009 until 1 July 2013: Jeannette Wopperer
- since 19 March 2014: Nicola Schelling

== Infrastructure ==
The Stuttgart Region is accessed through a dense roadenetwork of controlled access highways (Autobahn), federal Highway (Bundesstraßen), district roads (Kreisstrassen). The Bundesstraßen, enhanced to four to six lanes run in a star pattern towards the states capital. There are only few efficient tangential Connections. The two Autobahns A 8 and A 81 meet in the Region at the Leonberg triangle, one of the most used Autobahn junctions in Germany. Stuttgarter Hauptbahnhof, the main railway station is hub for the long-distance, regional and S-Bahn-Verkehr. Within a radius of 100 km you thereby can reach about 12 million people. Stuttgart Airport has become a European hub for almost 60 airlines. 10 Million passengers use it annually and 65,000 tons of air freight is shipped here. Flights are offered to over 120 destinations in more than 40 countries. Through the Stuttgarter Harbour the Region is connected to the inner German and western European waterway network. Cargo ships with a tonnage of up to 2,800 t are loaded and unloaded here daily. In order to accommodate the large number of commuters in the Region and relieve the roads, the Verkehrs- und Tarifverbund Stuttgart (VVS) offers, counting only the S-Bahn already a network of 215 km length and Services 83 stops.

The leisure traffic accumulates the majority of the distances taken by the regions 2.7 Million inhabitants. About 800,000 People, roundabout three quarters of the socially insured employees, do not work where they live.

== Economic significance ==
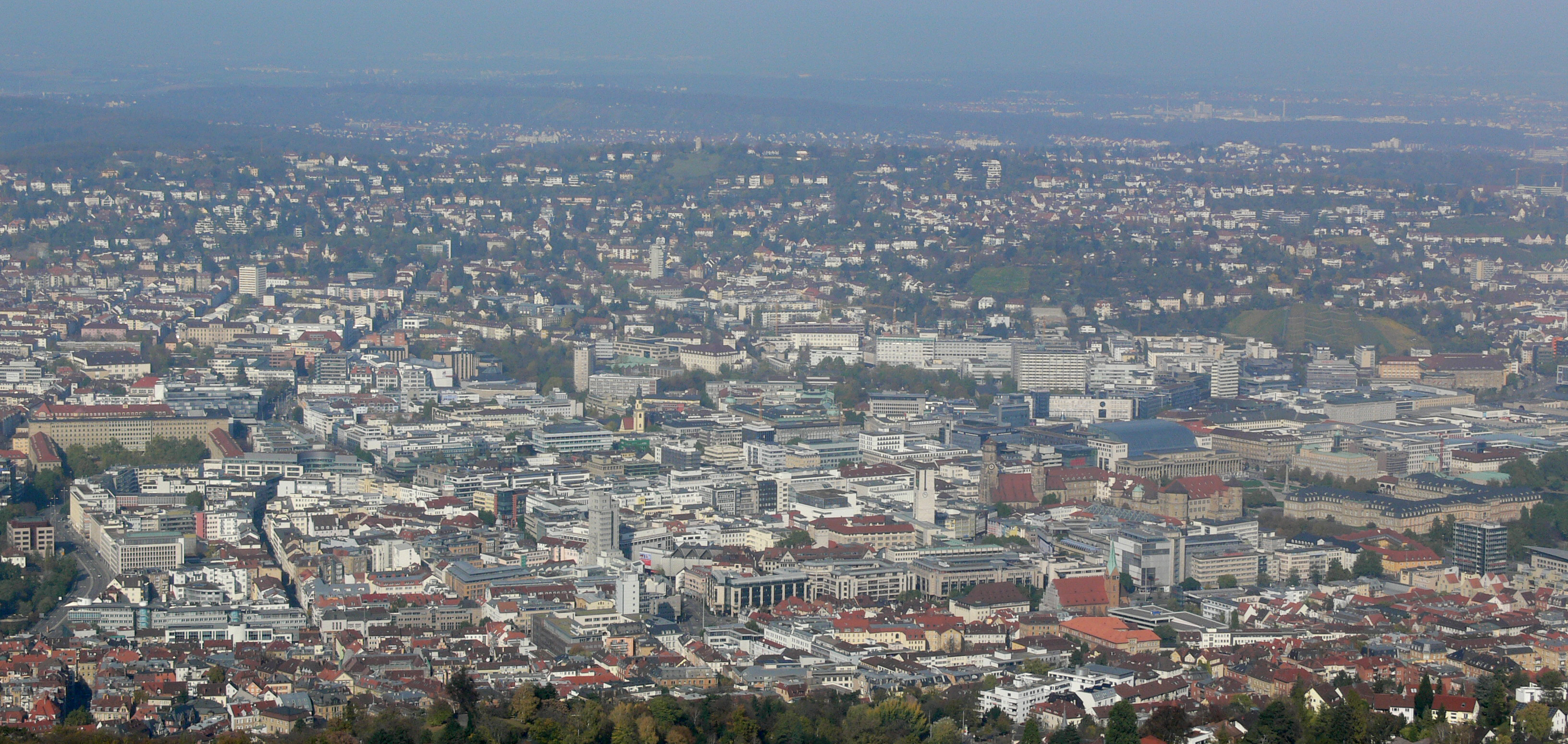
View of Stuttgart

The Gross Domestic Product for Stuttgart Region was recorded at about €35,000 per capita, about €64,000 per employed person and €120 billion total. The unemployment rate is 4.8 per cent. Stuttgart Region is one of Europe's economic centres. This is due not only to the influence of international companies, such as Daimler, Porsche, Robert Bosch, Celesio, Hewlett-Packard and IBM (all of whom have their world or German headquarters here), but also to the influence of medium-sized enterprises such as Behr, Kärcher, Märklin, Stihl, Festo, and Trumpf. In total, approximately 150,000 companies are located in the Stuttgart Region. 24 per cent of employees in the Stuttgart Region work in the high-tech sector – a European record.

The Verband Region Stuttgart as a political entity is responsible for regional transportation planning and for the basic network of public transport in Stuttgart Region.

== Research and development ==
Out of the total Investments in R&D of German companies, more than 10% is invested by companies from the Stuttgart Region, which is one of the reasons for its leading high patent application amount. Two institutes of the Max Planck Society, six of the Fraunhofer Society, for industrial development institutes where several companies work together, one large research institution, 88 transfer centers of the Steinbeis foundation for economic Promotion and many research facilities at Universities and Universities of Applied sciences are located in the region.

== Administrative District of Stuttgart ==
Stuttgart Region shouldn't be confused with the Administrative District of Stuttgart.

The German state of Baden-Württemberg is sub-divided into four districts:

- Administrative District of Stuttgart
- Administrative District of Tübingen
- Administrative District of Karlsruhe
- Administrative District of Freiburg

Stuttgart Region is part of the "Administrative District of Stuttgart" (Regierungsbezirk Stuttgart, 4 million inhabitants, 11,000 km^{2}).

== Stuttgart Metropolitan Area ==
The Stuttgart Metropolitan Area (pop. 5.3 million), according to the definition of the European Union, is neither identical with the "inner" Stuttgart Region nor with the Administrative District of Stuttgart.

The Stuttgart Metropolitan Area consists i.a. of the following larger cities (approx. 50 km from Stuttgart City Center):

- Stuttgart Region, 2.7 million inhabitants
- Heilbronn, 120,000 inhabitants, Administrative District of Stuttgart
- Schwäbisch Gmünd, 65,000 inhabitants, Administrative District of Stuttgart
- Tübingen, 85,000 inhabitants, Administrative District of Tübingen
- Reutlingen, 115,000 inhabitants, Administrative District of Tübingen
- Pforzheim, 115,000 inhabitants, Administrative District of Karlsruhe

and their surrounding counties.

== Maps ==
map of Baden-Württemberg
Left: Stuttgart Region - Right: Stuttgart Administrative District

== Tourism ==
A selection of regional attractions:

- Staatsgalerie Stuttgart (James Stirling designed the extension)
- Kunstmuseum Stuttgart
- State Museum of Natural History Stuttgart
- Landesmuseum Württemberg im Alten Schloss
- House of History Baden-Württemberg
- Linden-Museum (Völkerkunde-Museum)
- Hochdorf Chieftain's Grave
- Open-air museum Beuren and Hohenneuffen castle
- Hohenasperg fortress with museum Hohenasperg – a german prison
- German Literature archive Marbach
- Museum Ritter in Waldenbuch (Art- and chocolatemuseum)
- Mercedes-Benz Museum at the NeckarPark Stuttgart-Bad Cannstatt
- Porsche-Museum in Zuffenhausen
- Ludwigsburg Palace with gardens and baroque old town
- Lichtenberg Castle near Großbottwar
- Reichenberg Castle Oppenweiler
- Old town of Esslingen
- Old town of Besigheim over Neckar and Enz
- Old town Schorndorf
- State Theater Stuttgart
- Wilhelma (Germanies only and Europes largest zoological-botanical garden)
- Carl-Zeiss-Planetarium
- Cannstatter Spas Berg and Leuze (largest Mineralwater deposit in western Europe)
- Stuttgarter Fernsehturm (first TV Tower of its kind worldwide)
- SI-Centrum
- Hundertwasserhaus Plochingen Wohnen unterm Regenturm. Residential and Business complex in Plochingen designed by Friedensreich Hundertwasser.

== Festivals ==
- Cannstatter Volksfest (by many considered the second largest beer festival after the Oktoberfest)
- Trickfilmfestival Stuttgart (one of the worldwide largest and most important festivals for animation)
- Stuttgart Spring Festival
- Stuttgarter Weindorf
- Schäferlauf in Markgröningen (oldest Volksfest in Württemberg)
- Christmas Market in Stuttgart and Medieval Christmas Market in Esslingen am Neckar
- Vaihinger Maientagmbergs)
- Göppinger Maientag (for more than 350 years)
- Waiblinger Altstadtfest
- Fellbacher Herbst

== Trivia ==
- Over 3,600 patents are filed each year in the Stuttgart Region.
- Besides the car, the ring binder, office copy machine, Nylon stockings, the spark plug, the electric hand drill (Fa. C. & E. Fein), brassiere, Unimog, VW Beetle, time clock and portable Radio where invented here.
- Theodor Beltle, merchant a creative mind, developed sherbet powder in Stuttgart-Bad Cannstatt in 1925.
