= Altenriet =

- Municipality
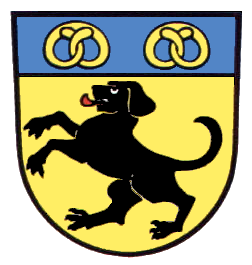
- Coat of arms

- Location of Altenriet within Esslingen district
- Interactive map of Altenriet
- Location within Germany Location within Baden-Württemberg
- Coordinates: 48°35′27″N 9°13′14″E
- Country: Germany
- State: Baden-Württemberg
- Admin. region: Stuttgart
- District: Esslingen

Government
  - Mayor (2017–25): Bernd Müller

Area
  - Total: 3.35 km^{2} (1.29 sq mi)
- Elevation: 403 m (1,322 ft)

Population (2025-12-31)
  - Total: 1,928
  - Density: 576/km^{2} (1,490/sq mi)
- Time zone: UTC+01:00 (CET)
  - Summer (DST): UTC+02:00 (CEST)
- Postal codes: 72657
- Dialling codes: 07127
- Vehicle registration: ES
- Website: www.altenriet.de

Altenriet (German pronunciation: [ˈaltn̩ʁiːt]) is a municipality in the district of Esslingen in Baden-Württemberg. It belongs to the region Stuttgart. (until 1992 Region Mittlerer Neckar) and the European Metropolitan Region Stuttgart. The municipality belongs to the Neckartenzlingen municipal administration association.

== Geography ==
=== Geographical location ===
Altenriet lies in a scenic area. The village, which is naturally part of the Schönbuch, is almost up to the steep drop towards the Neckar valley and offers a free view of the Swabian Alb.

=== Structure ===
No other places belong to the community except the village of Altenriet. A 31 hectare large, uninhabited exclave belongs to the municipal territory. It is four kilometres away from the centre of the village and is situated in the Schaichtal on Markung Walddorfhäslach.

=== Neighbouring communities ===
Neighbouring communities are in the north Schlaitdorf, in the east and south Neckartenzlingen. (both county Esslingen) and in the west Walddorfhäslach (District of Reutlingen).

== History ==
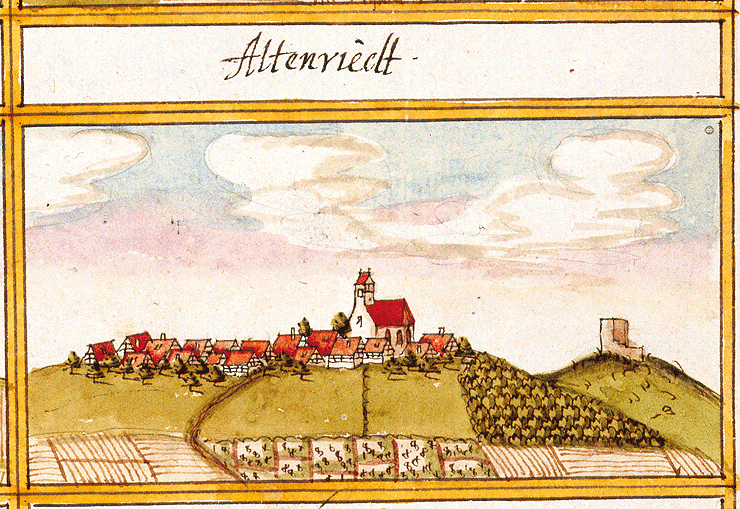
Altenriet 1683/1685 in the Kieser forest camp book

=== Early history ===
Altenriet was first mentioned in documents around 1100 as the name of the local noble family, the name is derived from the word "Ried" for swamp. In the 13th century the lords of Riet built a castle in the area of the present Protestant churchyard. Later, the "Castle Neuenriet" was built outside the village, the "Castle Altenriet" fell into disrepair already in the 15th century. Probably (Alten)Riet reached Württemberg between 1254 and 1265. In 1446 Altenryet is mentioned in writing.

=== Administrative affiliation ===
With the formation of the Oberämter, the Oberamt Tübingen came first, but was already in 1842 to the Oberamt Nürtingen. Via the administrative district Nürtingen the village came to the administrative district Esslingen in 1973.

=== Religions ===
Altenriet is since the Reformation evangelical, even today there is only an evangelical congregation in the village. The parish, which has about 1,100 members (as of 2006), meets for worship in the St. Ulrich Church. Catholic Christians are spiritually supported from Neckartenzlingen.

=== Population development ===
The population figures are estimates, census results (¹) or official updates of the Land Statistical Office of Baden-Württemberg:

Year	Population
1600	ca. 200
1654	ca. 92
1802¹	376
1861¹	404
1900¹	420
1939¹	427
1946¹	618
1961¹	639
1970¹	916

Year	Population
1987¹	1,445
1991	1,460
1995	1,542
2005	1,855
2010	1,933
2015	1,904

== Politics ==
=== Mayor ===
Since the 19th century, the head of the village bore the designation "Schultheiss" (mayor), and on December 1, 1930, in Württemberg the official designation Schultheiss was replaced by Bürgermeister (mayor).

- ?-1845: Matthäus Friedrich Oßwald
- 1845-1853: Jauß
- 1853-1874: Johann Gottlieb Armbruster
- 1874-1915: Matthäus Friedrich Armbruster
- 1915-1918: Gottlieb Bernhardt, acting
- 1919-1945: August Armbruster
- 1945-1966: Emil Neuscheler, provisionally appointed on 28 April 1945 and confirmed in office in 1946.
- 1966-2002: Herbert Jirosch
- since 2002: Bernd Müller

=== City council ===
The local council in Altenriet has 10 members. The local elections in Baden-Wuerttemberg 2019 led to the following final result. The municipal council consists of the elected honorary municipal councillors and the mayor as chairman. The mayor is entitled to vote in the municipal council.

Parties		% 2019	Seats; 2019	% 2014	Seats; 2014
FWG	mitdenken-mitgestalten – Freie Wählergemeinschaft	36,70	4	44,56	5
AListe	Altenrieter Liste	42,96	4	43,31	4
ZA	Zukunft Altenriet, Unabhängige Bürger und SPD	20,34	2	12,13	1
gesamt		100,0	10	100,0	10
Wahlbeteiligung		74,37 %		64,29 %	

=== Crest ===
Official blazoning: Under a blue shield head, in it two fallen golden pretzels, in gold a jumping up, red-tinged black bracke (hunting dog).

The Heimatbuch des Kreises Nürtingen (1953) describes the coat of arms as follows The coat of arms adopted in 1931 shows under a blue shield head with two golden pretzels in golden field a jumping black male dog.

== Culture and sights ==
=== Music ===
The oldest association in Altenriet is the Liederkranz, founded in 1888. It is divided into a male choir and since 2011 into a choir project with the mixed choir ("aufgehorcht").

=== Buildings ===
The village originally belonged to the Neckartenzlingen. A branch church was first mentioned in 1365. From 1468 it is attested to St. Catherine and Ulrich. From 1648 Altenriet was supplied from Schlaitdorf. Today's parish church was built in the 16th century, probably in 1538, and after the Reformation it was equipped with a west and north gallery in the nave, an organ gallery in the choir and pulpit south of the choir arch with a wooden sacristy in front of it and was renovated in 1737. A total renovation with removal of these fixtures and complete renewal of the roof was carried out in 1957–1958. In addition to a new west gallery, pulpit and altar, stained glass windows were installed in three choir windows according to the design of Rudolf Yelin, the Younger (centre: Baptism of Jesus, Jesus at Court, Cross, Resurrection; side windows with evangelists, on the left flight to Egypt and healing of the blind, on the right Mary and Martha, discipleship).

=== Monuments of nature ===
South of the village there are old sandstone quarries, which have now been abandoned and overgrown. Today they are a natural monument.

=== Sports clubs ===
In Altenriet there is the TSV Altenriet (Turn- und Sportverein Altenriet). Some of its soccer teams in youth games form a sports community with the SpVgg. Germania Schlaitdorf due to lack of players. The tennis club TV Altenriet, founded in 1976, and since 2013 the riding club RV Altenriet, founded in 2013.

=== Regular events ===
- One week before Easter the traditional Brezelmarkt, known for over 340 years, takes place here. According to a legend about the Castle Neuenriet, the Brezel was invented here. The highlight is a parade on Palm Sunday with traditional carriages, which represent the legend about the invention of the pretzel at Castle Neuenriet.
- On the last weekend in September the TSV Altenriet invites to its slaughter festival.
- Every two years the local clubs and the volunteer fire brigade together with the community organize the Gässlefest.

== Economy and Infrastructure ==
=== Resident companies ===
In the 19th and 20th centuries, the sandstone quarry and a spinning mill were the most important economic factors. Sandstone quarrying was stopped in 1936. Today there are only small commercial enterprises as well as a furniture store in Altenriet.

=== Traffic ===
Altenriet is served by the VVS with bus route 75, bus route 188 and bus route 189. There are four bus stops in the local area. The B 27 from Tübingen to Stuttgart is about 4 km away near Walddorfhäslach. Via this road the airport Stuttgart and the federal motorway 8 can be reached in about 20 minutes.

Altenriet has no train station, the nearest train stations are in Nürtingen and Metzingen.

=== Pumped storage tank ===
In Altenriet in 1914/1915 a pumped storage basin was built by the former cotton spinning mill Gminder to pump water from the Neckar River from Neckartenzlingen and to drive a turbine in the Neckartenzlingen hydroelectric power station. This pumped storage power plant was the first of its kind in Europe. After the demolition of the pumped storage basin in 1998, a residential area was created on the former site.

=== Education ===
Altenriet has two kindergartens and one primary school. After elementary school the pupils usually attend the secondary schools in the Neckartenzlingen School Centre or the Gustav-Werner-Community School in Walddorfhäslach. Since September 2003 there is also a free primary school. (Schulwerkstatt e.V., Free School for Living Learning) in private sponsorship. The school fulfils the education and training plan of the state of Baden-Württemberg and teaches according to Montessori pedagogy.

=== Media ===
The official notification body is the Official Gazette of the Neckartenzlingen Municipal Administration Association. The daily newspaper Nürtinger Zeitung reports on local daily events.

=== Public institutions ===
The Volunteer Fire Brigade Altenriet is responsible for fire fighting and for assistance in public emergencies in the local area. It consists of an active department, a youth fire brigade and an old age unit.

=== Waste disposal ===
The waste management company of the district of Esslingen is responsible for waste disposal. There are separate collections for organic waste, household waste and paper. Packaging is collected within the framework of the Green Dot in so-called Yellow Sacks. Bulky waste will be collected free of charge against submission of one of two vouchers per year or can be taken to a disposal station. Waste electrical and metal scrap and other recyclable materials can also be handed in at the disposal stations. For hazardous waste such as fluorescent lamps and paints there are special collections of problematic materials.

=== Water supply ===
The municipality of Altenriet is a member of the Ammertal-Schönbuchgroup water supply association. This association supplies the community with water from Lake Constance.

== Personalities ==
=== Honorary citizen ===
On 2 December 2011, former mayor Herbert Jirosch was awarded honorary citizenship for his life's work in local politics as well as in social, cultural and economic matters.

=== Personalities who have worked locally ===
- Dominic Maroh (* 1987), soccer player, born in Nürtingen, grew up in Altenriet
- Konstantin Hert (* 1986), operator of the YouTube channel freekickerz, grew up and lives in Altenriet

== Literature ==
- Hans Schwenkel: Heimatbuch des Kreises Nürtingen. Band 2. Würzburg 1953, S. 93–107.
- Der Landkreis Esslingen. – Hrsg. vom Landesarchiv Baden-Württemberg i. V. mit dem Landkreis Esslingen, Jan Thorbecke Verlag, Ostfildern 2009, ISBN 978-3-7995-0842-1, Band 1, Seiten 300–310
