= Denkendorf, Baden-Württemberg =

Denkendorf
- Municipality
- Coat of arms

- Location of Denkendorf within Esslingen district
- Interactive map of Denkendorf
- Location within Germany Location within Baden-Württemberg
- Coordinates: 48°41′45″N 9°19′3″E
- Country: Germany
- State: Baden-Württemberg
- Admin. region: Stuttgart
- District: Esslingen

Government
  - Mayor (2018–26): Ralf Barth

Area
  - Total: 13.05 km^{2} (5.04 sq mi)
- Elevation: 291 m (955 ft)

Population (2025-12-31)
  - Total: 11,123
  - Density: 852.3/km^{2} (2,208/sq mi)
- Time zone: UTC+01:00 (CET)
  - Summer (DST): UTC+02:00 (CEST)
- Postal codes: 73770
- Dialling codes: 0711
- Vehicle registration: ES
- Website: www.denkendorf.de

Denkendorf (German pronunciation: [ˈdɛŋkn̩ˌdɔʁf]; Swabian: Denggadorf) is a municipality in the district of Esslingen in Baden-Württemberg in southern Germany. It is located 5 km south of Esslingen, and 14 km southeast of Stuttgart.

== Geographical location ==
Denkendorf is just outside the Filder on the southern slopes of Körsch - and Sulzbach valley.

== Municipality arrangement ==
Denkendorf includes the homestead Spieth-Hof and the house Friedrichsmühle as well as proofs of the former village "Der hangende Hof".

== Neighboring communities ==
Adjacent municipalities are Esslingen am Neckar in the north, Deizisau in the northeast, Köngen in the east Unterensingen in the south, Neuhausen auf den Fildern in the west and Ostfildern in the northwest (all Esslingen district).

== History ==
Denkendorf is first mentioned in a document of 1129 in which Pope Honorius II took the monastery of Denkendorf under his protection. During the construction of the Autobahn (A8 today) in 1935, a series of Alemannic burial sites was uncovered, which are dated in the period shortly before 700 A.D.

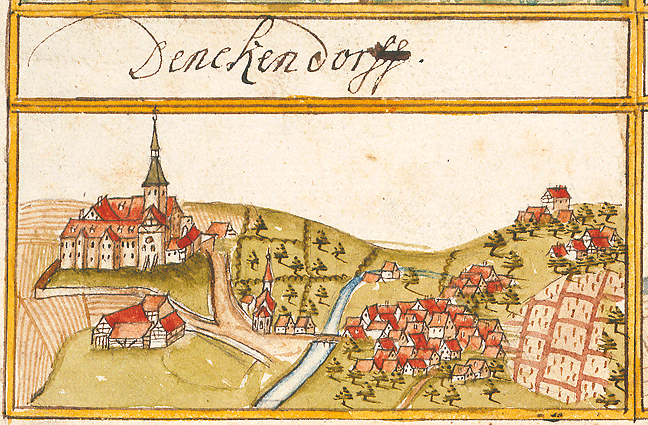
Denkendorf in 1683, Forest book Andreas Kieser

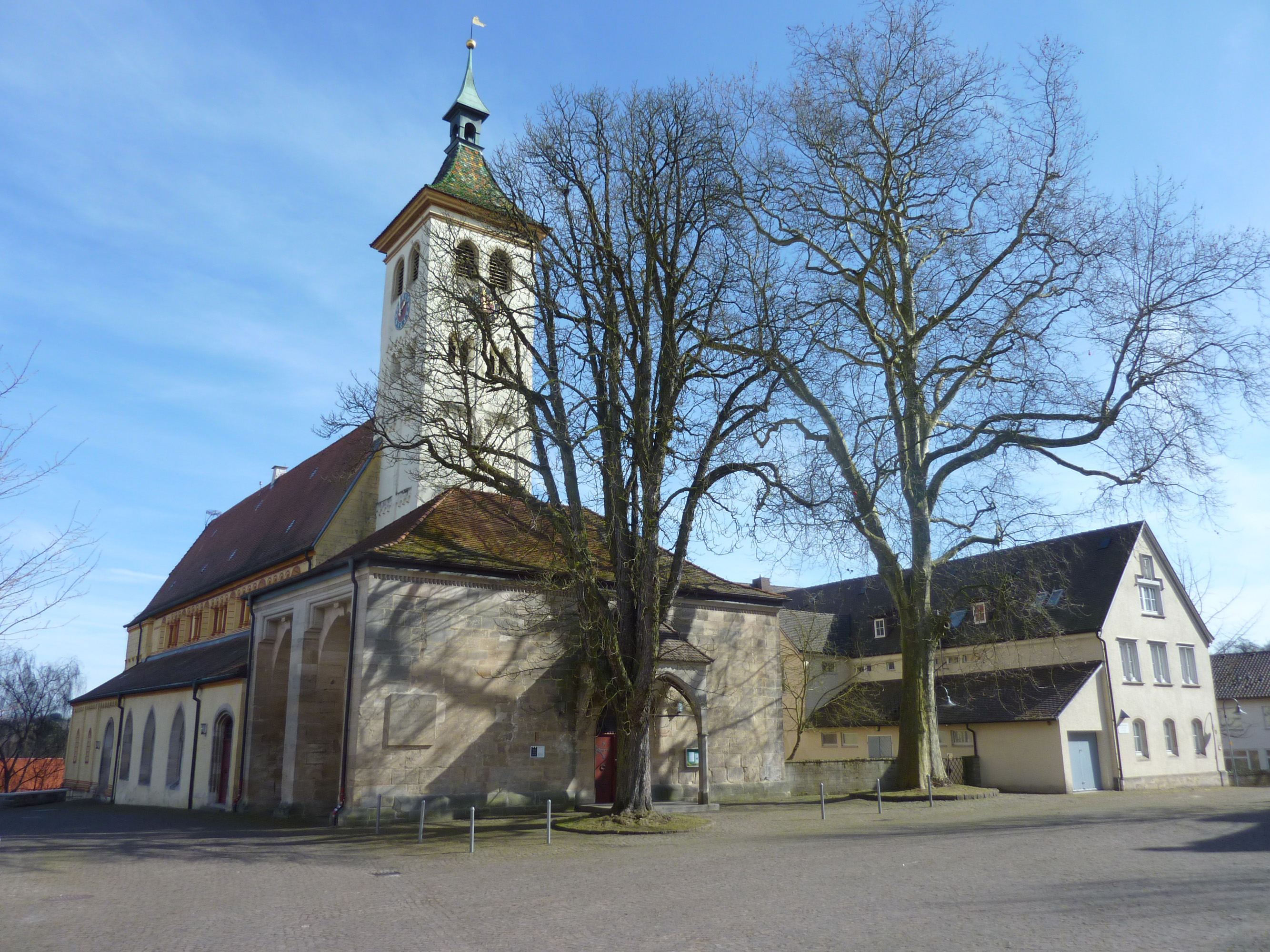
Denkendorf-Abbey

After the end of World War II, the population soared, quadrupling from 1945 to 1995. Despite the district and municipal reform of 1973/74 Denkendorf maintained its independence.

== Crest ==
The coat of arms is a golden Lorraine cross with a golden letter D to the left and to right, all on a solid royal blue background.

== Demographics ==
View chart definition.

== Economy and Infrastructure ==
=== Transportation ===
From 1926 to 1978 Denkendorf was connected by the tram service of the Esslingen–Nellingen–Denkendorf Tramway with the county town of Esslingen am Neckar. In Nellingen there is also access to the lines U7 and U8 of the Stuttgart light rail.

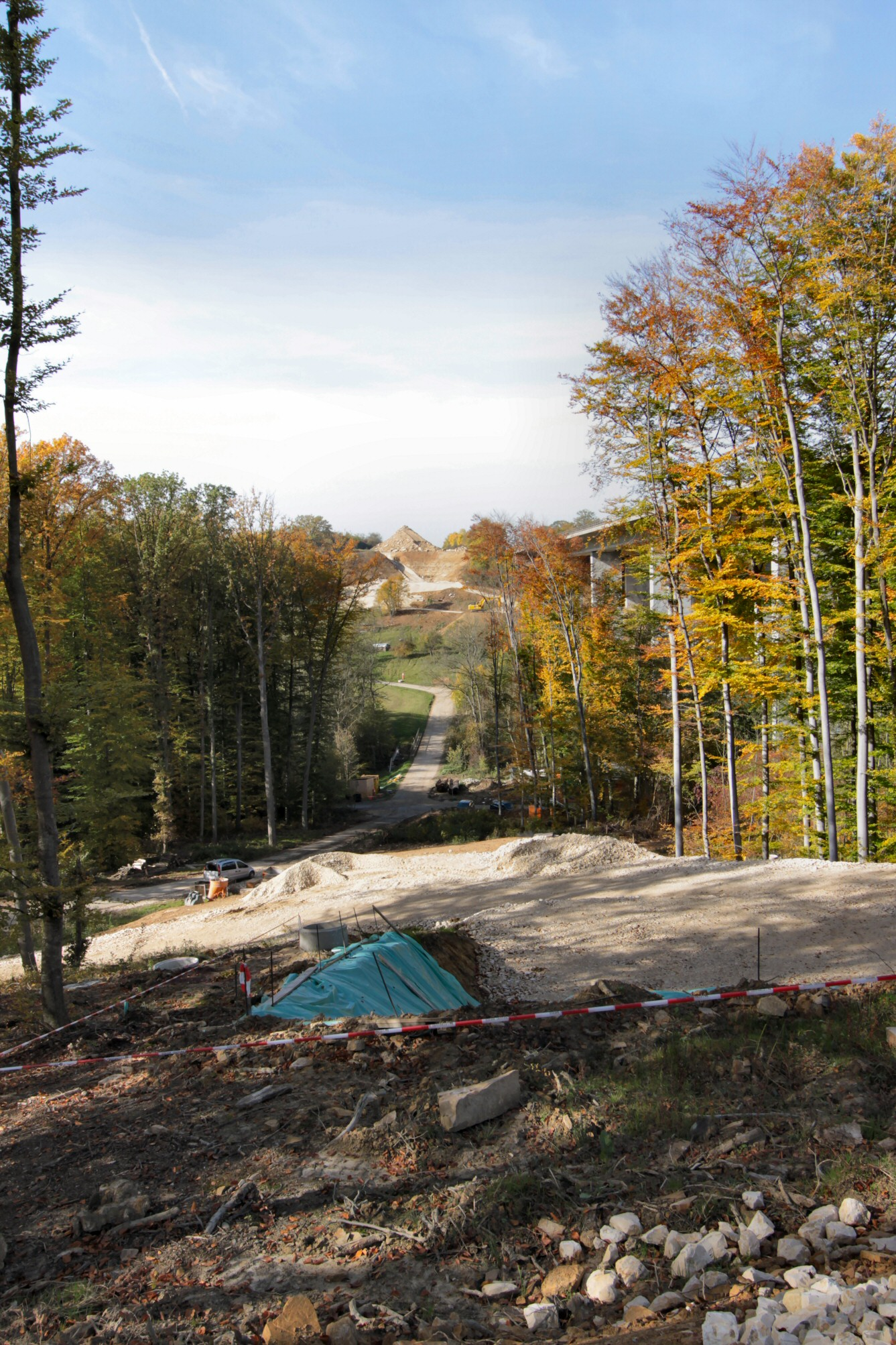
Sulzbachbrücke under construction Stuttgart-Wendlingen high-speed railway

The national road 10 (B 10) can be accessed via the Körsch valley or the Nellingen ring road in a few minutes and connects with Stuttgart, Esslingen, Plochingen and Göppingen. The Bundesautobahn A8 leads south past the town. It connects Stuttgart with Munich and Karlsruhe. The two nearest junctions are to the East - Wendlingen (just 10 min.) and to the West - Neuhausen (5 min.) Also in the municipal district is the Sulzbach viaduct that leads the Autobahn over the eponymous river. The Stuttgart Airport can be reached in less than 15 minutes.

== Twinning ==
Denkendorf has been twinned with the city of Meximieux in France (near Lyon) since 1986. The twinning involves summer camps, annual festivals, tournaments and student exchanges.
