= Esslingen (district) =

Coordinates: 48.69°N 9.32°E

- District
- Flag Coat of arms
- Country: Germany
- State: Baden-Württemberg
- Adm. region: Stuttgart
- Capital: Esslingen am Neckar

Government
  - District admin.: Heinz Eininger (CDU)

Area
  - Total: 641.49 km^{2} (247.68 sq mi)

Population (31 December 2022)
  - Total: 540,226
  - Density: 840/km^{2} (2,200/sq mi)
- Time zone: UTC+01:00 (CET)
  - Summer (DST): UTC+02:00 (CEST)
- Vehicle registration: ES, NT
- Website: www.landkreis-esslingen.de

Esslingen is a Landkreis (district) in the centre of Baden-Württemberg, Germany. Neighboring districts are (from north clockwise) Rems-Murr, Göppingen, Reutlingen, Böblingen and the district-free city Stuttgart.

Until 15 October 1964, the district's name was officially written as Landkreis Eßlingen.

== History ==
The district dates back to the Oberamt Esslingen, which was created when the previously free imperial city of Esslingen am Neckar became part of Württemberg in 1803. It was changed several times in the course of history. From 1810 to 1818, it belonged to the Landvogtei Rothenberg and from 1818 until it was dissolved in 1924 to the Neckarkreis. In 1934 the Oberamt was renamed Kreis Eßlingen and the now termed Landkreis Eßlingen was enlarged by several municipalities of the dissolved Oberamt Stuttgart and the Kreise Schorndorf, Kirchheim unter Teck and Göppingen on 1 October 1938.

After several changes over the next century, it was converted into a district in 1938. Additionally, with the territorial Partition act on 24 April 1938, it was enlarged by adding several municipalities from the neighboring Amtsoberamt Stuttgart, Oberamt Schorndorf, Oberamt Kirchheim and Göppingen.

On 16 October 1964 the state government allowed the change from the previous spelling to the current Landkreis Esslingen.

In 1973, the district was merged with the district Nürtingen (without Grafenberg). In 1975, two municipalities (Leinfelden and Musberg) from the district Böblingen were added to give the district today's borders.

Since the completion of the municipality reform the Landkreis Esslingen yet consists of 44 municipalities, amongst them 13 towns and among those, in turn, six Major district towns (Esslingen am Neckar, Filderstadt, Kirchheim unter Teck, Leinfelden-Echterdingen, Nürtingen and Ostfildern). The districts largest town is Esslingen am Neckar, the smallest municipality Altdorf near Nürtingen. In 1980 German right-wing extremists of the Deutsche Aktionsgruppen committed a bomb attack on the administrative district office and the district administrators house.

== Geography ==
The district is cut into two halves by the river Neckar. The west part is part of the Filder plain, while the east is part of the mountains of the Swabian Alb (Schwäbische Alb) and the Schurwald (part of the Swabian-Franconian mountain range).

At Plochingen the Fils flows into the Neckar river which leaves the district near Esslingen-Mettingen heading towards Stuttgart. With 229 m above sea level the water level of the Neckar near Mettingen represents the districts lowest Point. The highest point is located 830 m above SL in the Brucker Hölzle near Bissingen-Ochsenwang.

=== Places ===
The list of localities in the district Esslingen consists of about 185 places (Cities, towns, villages, hamlets, smallholdings and dwelling places) as far as they are geographically separate.

=== Neighbouring districts ===
The Landkreis Esslingen borders in clockwise direction starting in the North the Landkreise (districts) Rems-Murr-Kreis, Göppingen, Reutlingen and Böblingen as well as the Stadtkreis (urban district) Stuttgart.

=== Natural reserves ===
The Landkreis Esslingen owns the following natural reserves. According to the reserves statistic of the Landesanstalt für Umwelt, Messungen und Naturschutz Baden Württemberg (LUBW), 2,320.57 hectares (5,734.3 acres) of the district's area is under nature protection (3.62 %).

1. Alter Neckar: 21.3 ha; Esslingen am Neckar and Altbach
2. Am Rank (Röhmsee): 13 ha; Unterensingen
3. Denkendorfer Erlachsee: 4.4 ha; Denkendorf
4. Eichhalde: 85 ha; Bissingen an der Teck
5. Erkenbergwasen: 15.7 ha; Neidlingen
6. Grienwiesen (Schülesee): 11.5 ha; Unterensingen
7. Häslachwald: 53.6 ha (thereof 8.6 ha in the district Esslingen); City Ostfildern - area Kemnat
8. Jusi/Auf dem Berg: 48.9 ha; Kohlberg and Kappishäusern
9. Krähenhäule: 5.3 ha; Esslingen am Neckar
10. Kurzer Wasen/Roter Wasen: 29.1 ha; Weilheim an der Teck
11. Limburg: 161.5 ha; Weilheim an der Teck
12. Musberger Eichberg: 14.4 ha; Leinfelden-Echterdingen
13. Nägelestal: 20.0 ha; Kirchheim unter Teck
14. Neckarwasen: 13.3 ha; Köngen and Wendlingen am Neckar
15. Neuffener Heide: 16.9 ha; Neuffen
16. Neuffener Hörnle-Jusenberg: 48.0 ha; Neuffen
17. Oberes Lenninger Tal including side valleys: 593 ha; municipality Lenningen - areas Gutenberg and Oberlenningen
18. Randecker Maar including Zipfelbachschlucht: 110.0 ha; Ochsenwang and Hepsisau
19. Schaichtal: 467.8 ha; Aich, Grötzingen and Neuenhaus, Altenriet and Schlaitdorf, Waldenbuch (Landkreis Böblingen), Walddorf and Häslach (Landkreis Reutlingen) and Dettenhausen (Landkreis Tübingen)
20. Schönrain: 7.1 ha; Neckartenzlingen
21. Schopflocher Moor (Torfgrube): 50.4 ha; municipality Lenningen - Schopfloch and Ochsenwang
22. Siebenmühlental: 98.5 ha; 52.6 ha on the Areas of Filderstadt and Leinfelden-Echterdingen in the Landkreis Esslingen and 45.8 ha on the area of Steinenbronn and Waldenbuch in the Landkreis Böblingen
23. Stettener Bach: 49.6 ha; Esslingen am Neckar and Schanbach
24. Teck: 386.0 ha; Bissingen an der Teck, Dettingen unter Teck, Unterlenningen and Owen
25. Tobeltal including Mittagsfels and Wielandstein: 151.4 ha; municipality Lenningen, area Oberlenningen
26. Unter dem Burz: 26.9 ha; Neidlingen
27. Wernauer Baggerseen: 32.1 ha; Köngen, Wendlingen am Neckar and Wernau (Neckar)
28. Wernauer Lehmgrube: 5.5 ha; Wernau (Neckar)
29. Wiestal mit Rauber: 136.5 ha; Jesingen, Holzmaden and Ohmden

== Demographics ==
The numbers of inhabitants are census results (¹) or official updates of the Statistischen Landesamts Baden-Württemberg (only main residence). The demographic development before 1973 includes the sums of the inhabitants of those municipalities which nowadays belong to the district Esslingen but prior belonged to other administrative units (Oberämtern, Landkreisen).

Date	Inhabitants
1. December 1871 ¹	102,977
1. December 1900 ¹	123,690
17. May 1939 ¹	177,405
31. August 1950 ¹	255,596
27. May 1970 ¹	424,611

Date	Inhabitants
31. December 1973	450,515
31. December 1975	450,232
31. December 1980	460,156
31. December 1985	456,362
25. May 1987 ¹	460,429

Date	Inhabitants
31. December 1990	480,436
31. December 1995	490,169
31. December 2000	500,666
31. December 2005	514,245
31. December 2010	514,830
31. December 2015	524,127

With almost 525,000 inhabitants the district Esslingen stands in 6th place in Germany, slightly behind the district Ludwigsburg which pushed him back from the 5th Position in the first quarter of 2007.

== Politics ==
The district is administered by the Kreistag (district council) and the Landrat (District Administrator).

=== Kreistag (district council) ===
The Kreistag is elected every 5 years by the districts eligible voters. The election on 25. Mai 2014 led to following provisional results. The official result was published by the statistical state Office towards the end of 2014.

Parties and free voters		%2014	seats 2014	%2009	seats 2009	%2004	seats 2004	%1999	seats 1999	%1994	seats 1994	%1989	seats 1989
FW	Freie Wähler im Landkreis Esslingen	28.87	30	27.3	29	-	-	-	-	-	-	-	-
WG	Wählervereinigungen	-	-	-	-	25.1	27	28.1	30	27.3	30	27.8	38
CDU	Christlich Demokratische Union Deutschlands	23.85	23	23.8	25	30.4	31	31.1	31	25.1	26	25.1	34
SPD	Sozialdemokratische Partei Deutschlands	21.03	19	21.5	20	22.3	21	23.9	21	25.5	24	25.5	32
GRÜNE	Bündnis 90/Die Grünen	15.3	14	14.5	14	12.7	12	9.4	9	12.8	12	10.7	14
FDP	Freie Demokratische Partei	4.78	5	7.1	7	4.9	5	3.1	3	3.9	4	4.9	5
LINKE	Die Linke	3.77	3	2.1	1	-	-	-	-	-	-	-	-
REP	Die Republikaner	1.98	2	2.8	3	4.7	4	4.4	4	5.4	5	5.8	6
L.E.Bürger	Liste engagierter Bürger	0.42	-	–	–	-	-	-	-	-	-	-	-
UFB	Unabhängige Freie Bürger	–	–	0.8	1	-	-	-	-	-	-	-	-
Others	Others	–	–	-	-	-	-	-	-	0.1	-	0.3	-
total		100.0	96	100.0	100	100.0	100	100.0	98	100.0	101	100.0	129
turnout		49.71 %		52.8 %		53.8 %		54.3 %		68.2 %			

- WG: free voters, as the results from 1989 until 2004 are not dividable into individual free voter groups.

=== Landrat (district administrator) ===
The Kreistag elects the Landrat for a period of 8 years. The Landrat is the legal representative of the district as well as head of the Kreistag and its committees, but is not eligible to vote in those bodies. He leads the Landratsamt (courthouse) and is public servant of the district.

Among his responsibilities belongs the preparation of the district councils and ist committees sessions. He convokes the sessions, leads them and administers the decisions made there. His Proxy is the Erste Landesbeamte.

- 1933–1938: Ernst Mäulen
- 1938–1945: Hans Häcker
- 1945–1946: Fritz Landenberger
- 1946–1966: Georg Geist
- 1966–1972: Richard Schall
- 1973–2000: Hans Peter Braun
- since 2000: Heinz Eininger

== Coat of arms ==
The coat of arms shows the imperial eagle taken from the coat of arms of the city of Esslingen. The checkered diamonds in the bottom are the symbol of the Dukes of Teck, and the horn on the breast of the eagle is the symbol of the Counts of Urach. Both symbols were taken from the coat of arms of the district of Nürtingen, as the two families played a major role in the history of the area.

== Economy and infrastructure ==
In the "Zukunftsatlas 2016" the district Esslingen ranked 22nd out of 402 districts, municipal associations and district free cities in Germany and therefore belongs to the regions with "very high opportunities for the future".

=== Economy ===
The most labour-intensive sectors in the district Esslingen are according to the states statistical office:

- car manufacturing: 14,500 employees
- health, veterinary and social services: 13,100 employees
- Mechanical Engineering: 23,300 employees
- services close to companies: 14,100 employees

=== Transportation ===
==== Air ====
Stuttgart Airport lies on the eastern border of the city Leinfelden-Echterdingen. The runways are situated mostly on grounds belonging to Filderstadt-Bernhausen.

==== Public transport ====
Since 1845 the eventual Württembergische Staatsbahn runs from Stuttgart to the district City Esslingen, since 1846 as far as Plochingen and 1847 as Filsbahn towards the crossing of the Swabian Albs in the direction of Geislinger Steige–Ulm.

In 1859 the Neckar-Alb-Bahn was attached starting in Plochingen towards Nürtingen–Reutlingen an. From this railway the Teckbahn of the Kirchheimer Eisenbahn-Gesellschaft branched off in Wendlingen (back then Unterbohingen) in 1864 and extended as far as Oberlenningen by the Staatsbahn in 1899. Another meanwhile defunct local branch line was the railway line Kirchheim (Teck) Süd–Weilheim (Teck, opened in 1908.

The Tälesbahn Nürtingen–Neuffen belongs to the Württembergischen Eisenbahn-Gesellschaft since its opening in 1900.

Over the course of 100 years a diverse public transport network developed on Filder plains at the southern border of Stuttgart, the Filderbahn-Gesellschaft. In Leinfelden-Echterdingen the S-Bahn (S2 and S3) to Stuttgart Airport put into operation between 1989 and 1993 uses partly the alignment of the line Vaihingen–Echterdingen put in use by the Deutsche Reichsbahn in 1920, from which in 1928 in Leinfelden a line branched off heading to Waldenbuch. The S2 line was extended from the Airport to Filderstadt-Bernhausen in the autumn of 2001.

In Echterdingen they linked to the line Möhringen–Neuhausen, built by the Filderbahn-Gesellschaft in metre gauge in 1897 and changed to Standard gauge in 1902. The part Möhringen–Echterdingen was replaced by a connection Möhringen–Leinfelden, which was built as an electric cross-country railway in meter gauge in 1928 and had been – parallel to the standard gauge line to Neuhausen – extended up to Echterdingen Ort. Since 1990 a standard gauge light rail called Stadtbahn (Line U5) runs only up to Leinfelden Bahnhof instead from where the S-Bahn carries on.

In Esslingen the tram Straßenbahn Esslingen am Neckar was inaugurated in 1912, which from 1919 on provided a link to the tram network of the Stuttgarter Straßenbahnen (SSB). It was replaced in 1944 through the trolleybus Esslingen am Neckar. In 1926 the interurban tram Esslingen–Nellingen–Denkendorf (END) was added, which did run up to the Filder until 1978 as well. Unlike the Filderbahn lines not from the west but rather from the northern side. Since 1929 it had a branch line from Nellingen towards Neuhausen.

Regarding the railways only two smaller sections have been defunct:

- 1955: Leinfelden–Musberg–Waldenbuch (Siebenmühlentalbahn, 11.7 km)
- 1982: Kirchheim Süd–Holzmaden–Weilheim (7.7 km)

In the year 2000 the SSB opened the light rail Stuttgart–Nellingen.

Responsible for the public transport is the Verkehrs- und Tarifverbund Stuttgart (VVS).

==== Individual transport ====
From west to east the Bundesautobahn 8, connecting Stuttgart and Ulm, is running through the district area. The most important Bundesstraßen are the B 10 Stuttgart–Ulm, the B 27 Stuttgart–Tübingen, the B 312 Flughafen–Reutlingen and the B 313 Plochingen–Reutlingen.

=== District institutions ===
The district Esslingen is Provider of the following vocational schools: Friedrich-Ebert-Schule (industrial school) Esslingen, John-F.-Kennedy-Schule (commercial school) Esslingen, Käthe-Kollwitz-Schule (domestic Management school) Esslingen, Max-Eyth-Schule (industrial school) Kirchheim unter Teck, Jakob-Friedrich-Schöllkopf-Schule (commercial school) Kirchheim unter Teck, Philipp-Matthäus-Hahn-Schule (industrial school) Nürtingen, Otto-Umfrid-Schule (industrial school) Nürtingen, Albert-Schäffle-Schule (commercial school) Nürtingen and Fritz-Ruoff-Schule (domestic Management and agricultural school) Nürtingen, moreover the Rohräcker schools Esslingen (School for mentally disabled, physically disabled and speech impaired pupils and correspondingly with School kindergarten and also School for sick pupils with longer lasting Hospital treatment) and the Bodelschwinghschule for mentally impaired Nürtingenwith school kindergarten. In Dettingen unter Teck another school for mentally and speech impaired school with school kindergarten was constructed.

Additionally the district is shareholder of the medius KLINIKEN gGmbH. This association is carrier of the Paracelsus-hospital Ruit in Ostfildern-Ruit and the Hospital Kirchheim-Nürtingen with ist two sites Kirchheim unter Teck and Nürtingen. Both are academic teaching hospitals for the University of Tübingen.

== Towns and municipalities ==
Clickable map of towns and municipalities in the district

Vereinbarte Verwaltungsgemeinschaften / Gemeindeverwaltungsverbände (municipal administration unions):

1. Vereinbarte Verwaltungsgemeinschaft of the town Kirchheim unter Teck together with the municipalities of Dettingen unter Teck and Notzingen
2. Gemeindeverwaltungsverband Lenningen with office in Lenningen; Members: Municipalities of Lenningen and Erkenbrechtsweiler as well as the town Owen
3. Gemeindeverwaltungsverband Neckartenzlingen with office in Neckartenzlingen; Members: Altdorf, Altenriet, Bempflingen, Neckartailfingen, Neckartenzlingen and Schlaitdorf
4. Vereinbarte Verwaltungsgemeinschaft of the town Neuffen with the municipalities Beuren and Kohlberg
5. Vereinbarte Verwaltungsgemeinschaft of the town Nürtingen with the municipalities Frickenhausen, Großbettlingen, Oberboihingen, Unterensingen and Wolfschlugen
6. Gemeindeverwaltungsverband Plochingen with office in Plochingen; Members: Town Plochingen and the municipalities Altbach and Deizisau
7. Gemeindeverwaltungsverband Reichenbach an der Fils with office in Reichenbach an der Fils; Members: Baltmannsweiler, Hochdorf, Lichtenwald and Reichenbach an der Fils
8. Vereinbarte Verwaltungsgemeinschaft of the town Weilheim an der Teck with the municipalities Bissingen an der Teck, Holzmaden, Neidlingen and Ohmden
9. Gemeindeverwaltungsverband Wendlingen am Neckar with Office in Wendlingen am Neckar; Members: Town Wendlingen am Neckar and municipality Köngen

Towns
1. Aichtal
2. Esslingen am Neckar
3. Filderstadt
4. Kirchheim unter Teck
5. Leinfelden-Echterdingen
6. Neuffen
7. Nürtingen
8. Ostfildern
9. Owen
10. Plochingen
11. Weilheim an der Teck
12. Wendlingen
13. Wernau
Municipalities
1. Aichwald
2. Altbach
3. Altdorf
4. Altenriet
5. Baltmannsweiler
6. Bempflingen
7. Beuren
8. Bissingen an der Teck
9. Deizisau
10. Denkendorf
11. Dettingen unter Teck
12. Erkenbrechtsweiler
13. Frickenhausen
14. Großbettlingen
15. Hochdorf
16. Holzmaden

17. Kohlberg
18. Köngen
19. Lenningen
20. Lichtenwald
21. Neckartailfingen
22. Neckartenzlingen
23. Neidlingen
24. Neuhausen auf den Fildern
25. Notzingen
26. Oberboihingen
27. Ohmden
28. Reichenbach an der Fils
29. Schlaitdorf
30. Unterensingen
31. Wolfschlugen
Administrative districts
1. Kirchheim
2. Lenningen
3. Neckartenzlingen
4. Neuffen
5. Nürtingen
6. Plochingen
7. Reichenbach (Fils)
8. Weilheim (Teck)
9. Wendlingen (Neckar)
