= Bissingen an der Teck =

- Municipality
- Coat of arms

- Location of Bissingen an der Teck within Esslingen district
- Interactive map of Bissingen an der Teck
- Location within Germany Location within Baden-Württemberg
- Coordinates: 48°35′58″N 9°29′33″E
- Country: Germany
- State: Baden-Württemberg
- Admin. region: Stuttgart
- District: Esslingen

Government
  - Mayor (2019–27): Marcel Musolf

Area
  - Total: 17.06 km^{2} (6.59 sq mi)
- Elevation: 415 m (1,362 ft)

Population (2025-12-31)
  - Total: 3,377
  - Density: 197.9/km^{2} (512.7/sq mi)
- Time zone: UTC+01:00 (CET)
  - Summer (DST): UTC+02:00 (CEST)
- Postal codes: 73266
- Dialling codes: 07023
- Vehicle registration: ES
- Website: www.bissingen-teck.de

Bissingen (German pronunciation: [ˈbɪsɪŋən ʔan deːɐ̯ ˈtɛk], lit. 'Bissingen on the Teck'; Swabian: Bissenge) is a municipality in the district of Esslingen in Baden-Württemberg in southern Germany.

== Geographical location ==
Bissingen lies at the foot of the Swabian Jura, the district Ochsenwang on the Alb plateau. The municipality covers an altitude of 384 m on the border with Kirchheim unter Teck-Nabern to 830 m in "Brucker Hölzle", which is at the same time the highest point of Stuttgart (region).

Bissingen an der Teck in Esslingen district

== Outline ==
The municipality Bissingen an der Teck consists of the town core and the village Ochsenwang.

== Neighboring communities ==
Adjacent municipalities are Kirchheim unter Teck in the north, Weilheim an der Teck in the east, Neidlingen in the southeast, Lenningen in the south, Owen in the West and Dettingen unter Teck in the northwest (all Esslingen district).

== History ==
As one of the first places in the district of Esslingen, Bissingen is documented in the year 769. It is mentioned in the written tradition of the Lorsch Codex. From the 11th century to the mid-12th century, Bissingen belonged to the House of Zähringen, then to the Duckes of Teck. The place came to Württemberg in 1326. Bissingen belonged to Oberamt Kirchheim, this became in 1938 the district of Nürtingen. In the course of the district reform of 1973, Bissingen was adjoined to the district of Esslingen. On the eastern edge are the remains of the Wasserburg (water castle] Bissingen.

== Incorporations ==
On January 1, 1975, Ochsenwang was incorporated to Bissingen.

== Demographics ==
The number of inhabitants are obtained from census results (¹) or from official extrapolations by the statistical office of Stuttgart.

Date	Inhabitants
December 3, 1834 ¹	1,871
December 1, 1871 ¹	1,685
December 1, 1900 ¹	1,602
May 17, 1939 ¹	1,542
September 13, 1950 ¹	2,078
June 6, 1961 ¹	2,173
May 27, 1970 ¹	2,583
May 25, 1987 ¹	3,271
December 31, 1995	3,476
December 31, 2000	3,691
December 31, 2005	3,659
December 31, 2010	3,523

== Points of interest ==
=== Museums ===
In Ochsenwang is the Mörike House Ochsenwang, where Eduard Mörike lived in 1832.

== Music ==
Bissingen has a music club for brass bands, divided into youth and master chapel. Bissingen has adjacent to this a glee club. The MGV (Männergesangsverein) is divided into a children's choir (the "Kibize"), a mixed chorus ("Fresh Wind") and a men's choir.

== Orchards as formative landscape ==
Bissingen is surrounded by extensive orchards. In order to maintain these habitats, the Horticultural Association Bissingen takes care of old tree stocks to ensure that landscape and varieties are preserved for future generations. This is done through the support of community-owned orchards and the establishment of a mother garden with old varieties.

== Natural monuments ==
The "Randecker Maar" in the district Ochsenwang is a former volcanic vent of the Swabian volcano.

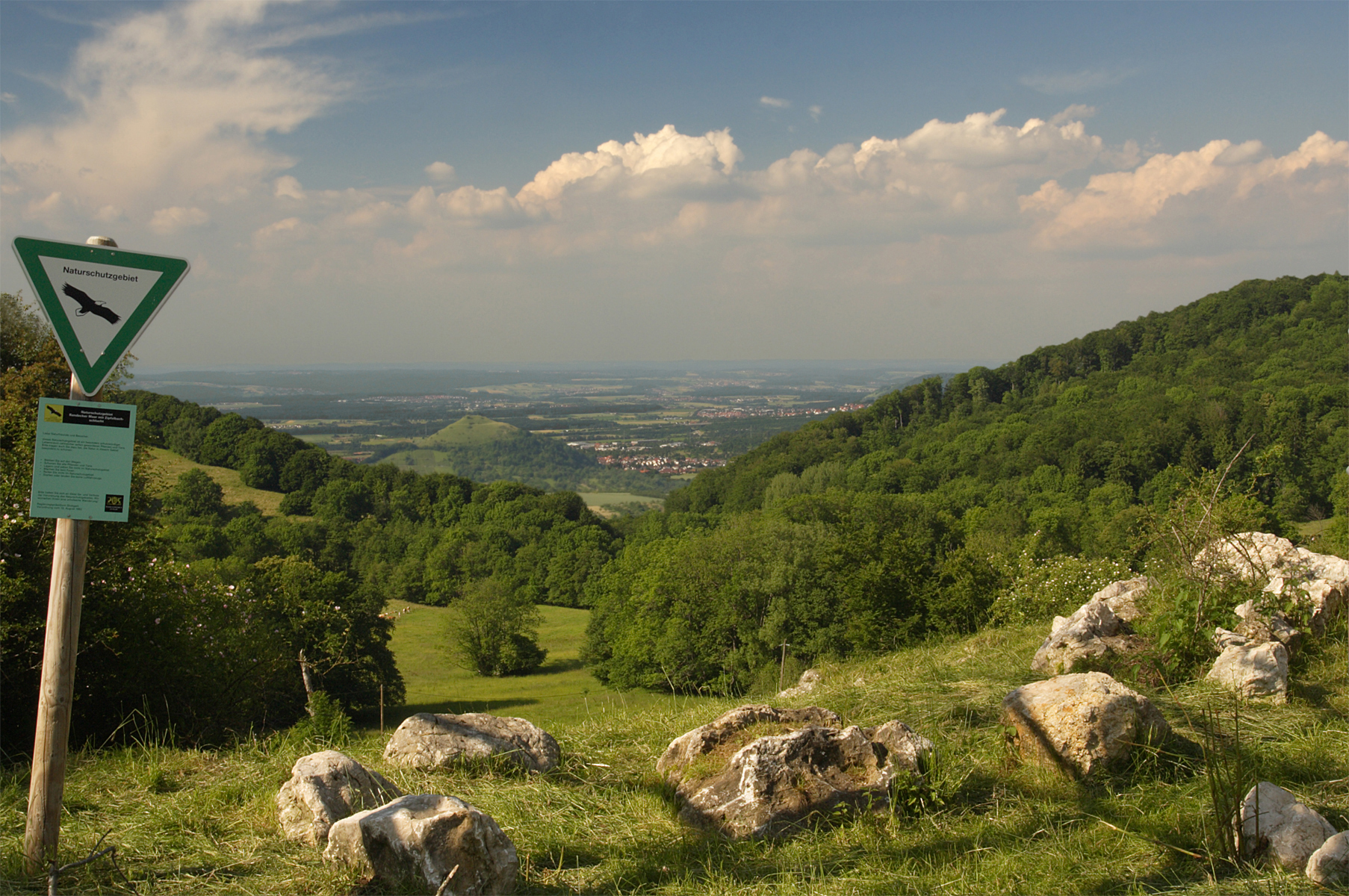
Randecker Maar, Nature conservation area, Swabian Jura

== Notable people from Bissingen an der Teck ==
- Johann Viktor Gruol the younger (?–1871), organ builder
- Georg Ehni (1828–1904), Member of Reichstag
- Robert von Gaupp, (1836–1908), state councilor, Member of Landtag
- Friedrich Goll, (1839–1911), organ builder
- Wilhelm Ederle, (1901–1966), doctor
