= Owen, Germany =

Owen
- Town
- Coat of arms

- Location of Owen within Esslingen district
- Interactive map of Owen
- Location within Germany Location within Baden-Württemberg
- Coordinates: 48°35′18″N 9°27′5″E
- Country: Germany
- State: Baden-Württemberg
- Admin. region: Stuttgart
- District: Esslingen

Government
  - Mayor (2016–24): Verena Grötzinger

Area
  - Total: 9.7 km^{2} (3.7 sq mi)
- Elevation: 391 m (1,283 ft)

Population (2025-12-31)
  - Total: 3,421
  - Density: 350/km^{2} (910/sq mi)
- Time zone: UTC+01:00 (CET)
  - Summer (DST): UTC+02:00 (CEST)
- Postal codes: 73277
- Dialling codes: 07021
- Vehicle registration: ES
- Website: www.owen.de

Owen (German pronunciation: [ˈaʊ.ən], see below) is a town in the district of Esslingen in Baden-Württemberg in southern Germany. It is located 40 kilometres (25 mi) southeast of Stuttgart and 7 kilometres (4.3 mi) south of Kirchheim unter Teck.

== Pronunciation ==
The name's pronunciation contradicts ordinary German orthographic rules; for this reason, the form Auen was sometimes appended parenthetically on older maps. The name derives from Middle High German ouwe, meaning floodplain, and kept its archaic spelling even as the pronunciation of the corresponding diphthong shifted.

== Traffic ==
Owen is connected to the railway system by the Teck Railway (Wendlingen–Oberlenningen). The Royal Württemberg State Railway built the station in 1899. There are bus connections to the neighbouring communities.

Through Owen leads Federal Road B 465 from Kirchheim unter Teck to Blaubeuren. Highway A 8 is three miles away, at junction Kirchheim-Ost.
