= Lenningen =

- Municipality
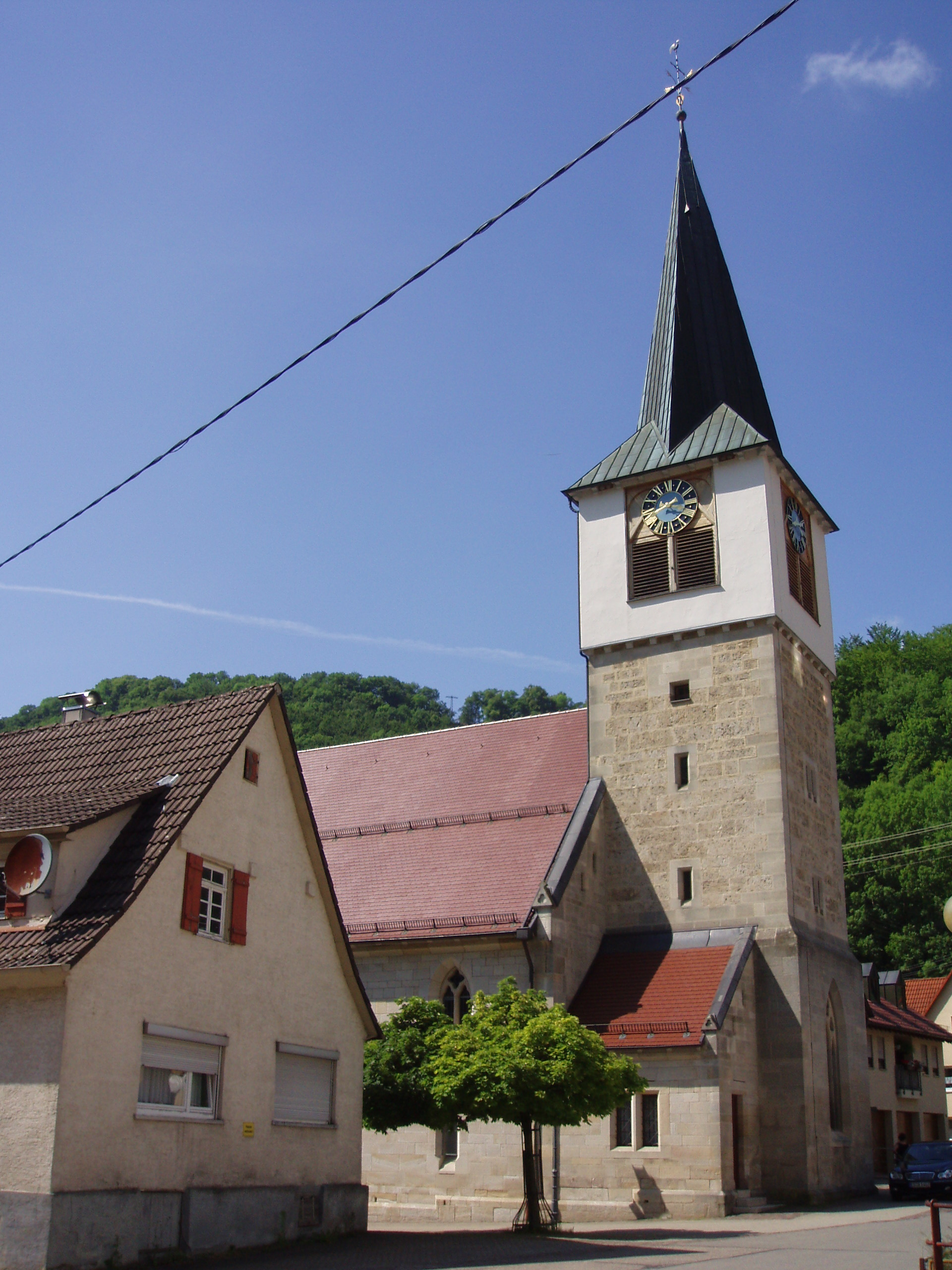

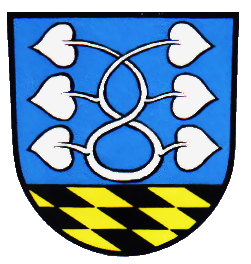
- Coat of arms

- Location of Lenningen within Esslingen district
- Interactive map of Lenningen
- Location within Germany Location within Baden-Württemberg
- Coordinates: 48°33′0″N 9°28′19″E
- Country: Germany
- State: Baden-Württemberg
- Admin. region: Stuttgart
- District: Esslingen

Government
  - Mayor (2023–31): Michael Schlecht

Area
  - Total: 41.44 km^{2} (16.00 sq mi)
- Elevation: 449 m (1,473 ft)

Population (2025-12-31)
  - Total: 7,884
  - Density: 190.3/km^{2} (492.7/sq mi)
- Time zone: UTC+01:00 (CET)
  - Summer (DST): UTC+02:00 (CEST)
- Postal codes: 73252
- Dialling codes: 07026
- Vehicle registration: ES
- Website: www.lenningen.de

Lenningen (German pronunciation: [ˈlɛnɪŋən]; Swabian: Lẽnnenge) is a municipality in the district of Esslingen in Baden-Württemberg in Germany.

== Neighbour communities ==
Those are in the east Wiesensteig (district of Göppingen), in the south Römerstein and Grabenstetten (both district of Reutlingen), in the west Erkenbrechtsweiler, in the northwest Owen and in the north Bissingen an der Teck and Neidlingen (all district of Esslingen).

== Transportation ==
Teckbahn from Wendlingen am Neckar via Kirchheim unter Teck ends in Oberlenningen. The Königlich Württembergischen Staats-Eisenbahnen built the stations in Unter- and Oberlenningen 1899 as unity stations. Nowadays the per hour circulating Regionalbahnen of DB Regio in the area of Lenningen stop at three stations: Oberlenningen, Unterlenningen and Brucken.

Parallel to Teckbahn in Lenningen runs A-road Bundesstraße 465 Biberach–Kirchheim. On this road you can reach five miles away junction Kircheim-east of A 8 Stuttgart–München.

== Notable people from Lenningen ==
- Adolf Scheufelen (1864–1941), engineer and entrepreneur
- Karl-Erhard Scheufelen (1903–1992), entrepreneur
- Klaus-Heinrich Scheufelen (1913–2008), engineer, entrepreneur and politician
- Klaus Eduard Scheufelen (b. 30 October 1913 – 26 January 2008), engineer, materials scientist with Operation Paperclip, corporate executive and CDU politician
- Karl Scheufelen (1823–1902), founder of paper factory Scheufelen
- Julius von Jan (1897–1964), parson and resistance fighter against nazism, became 1935 parson in Oberlenningen
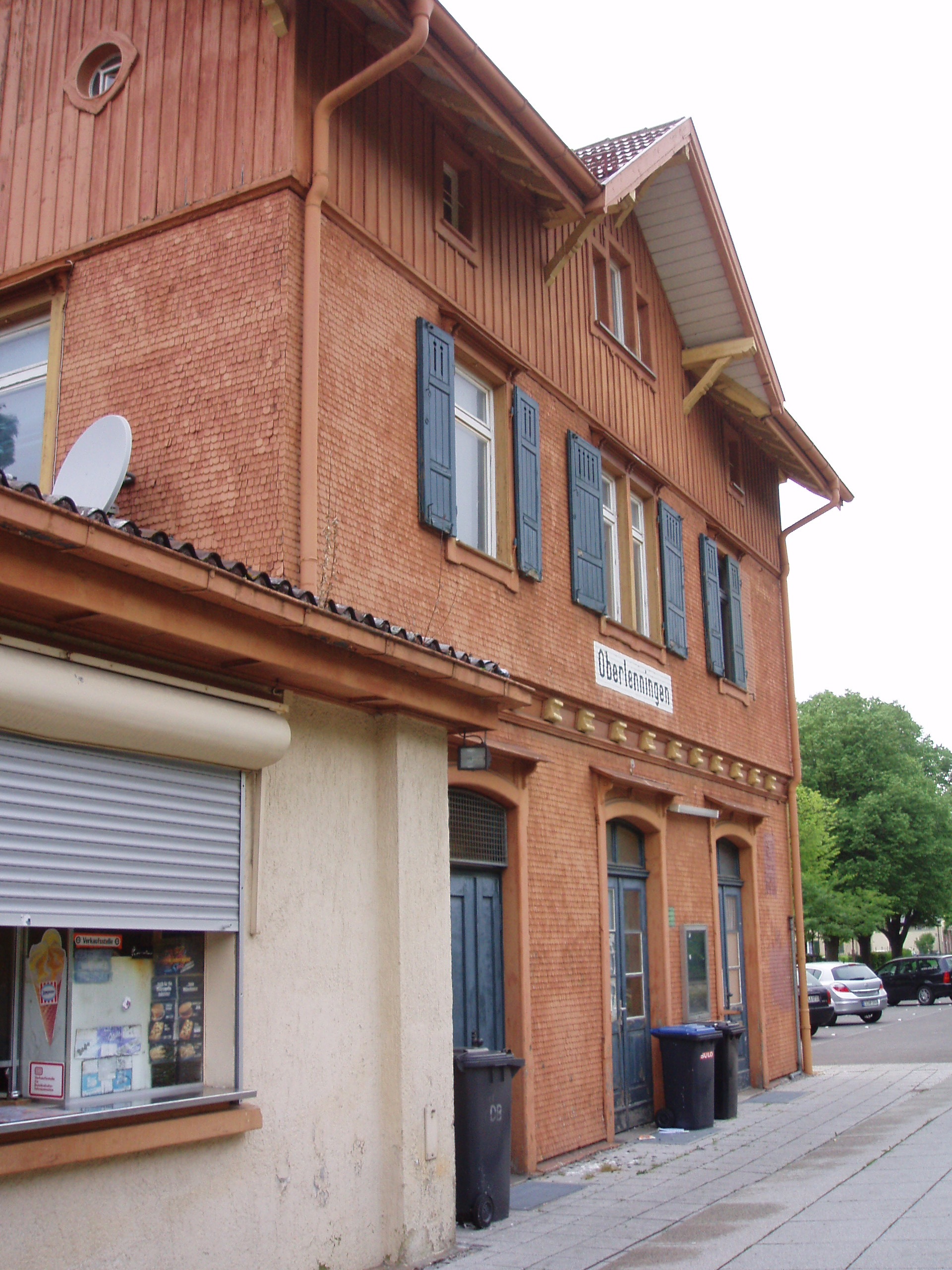
Oberlenningen, station

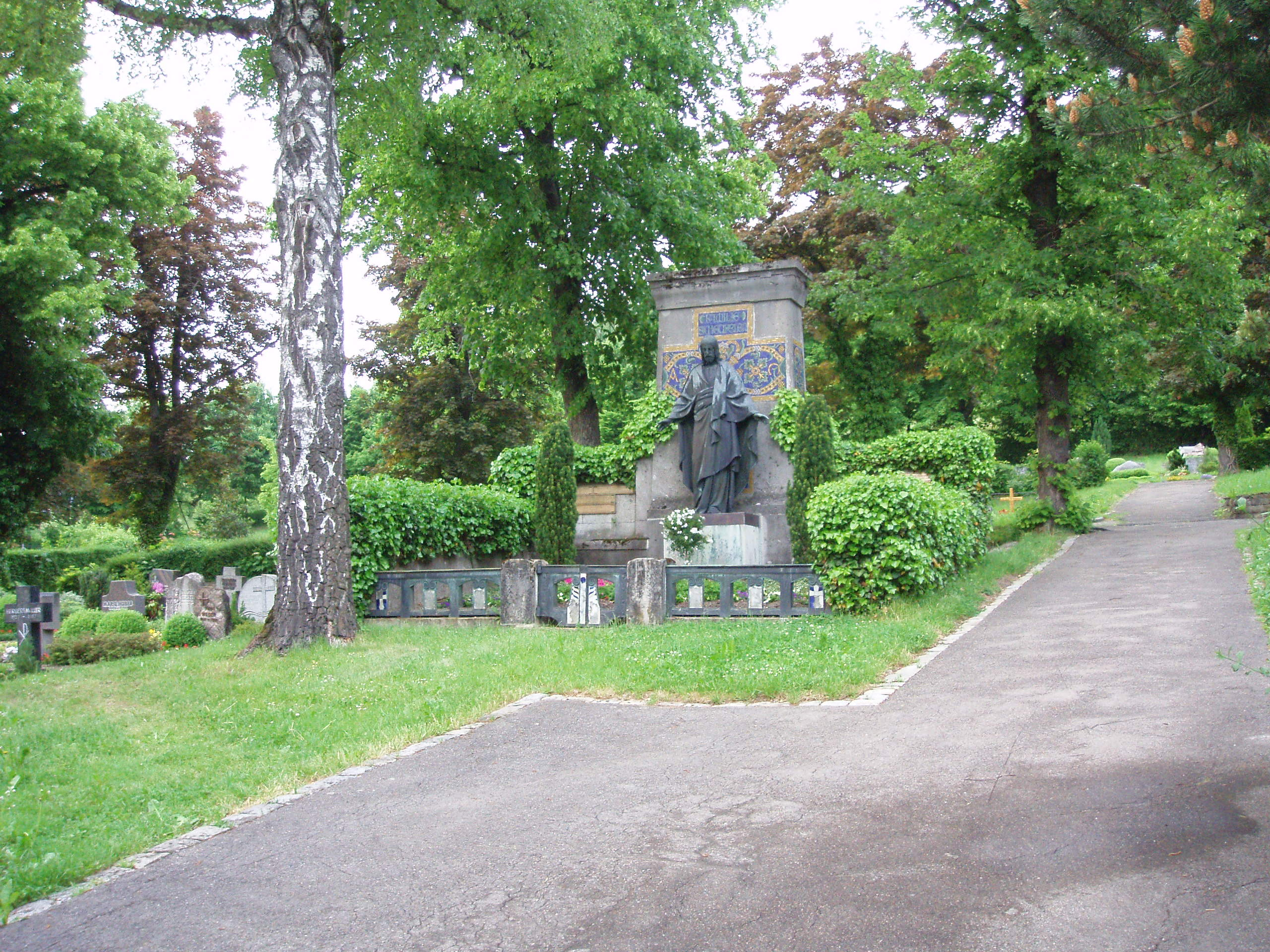
Oberlenningen, cemetery

== Demographics ==
Population development:

Year	Inhabitants
1970	7,667
1987	7,978
2011	8,015

== Districts ==
=== Brucken ===
Brucken was first mentioned 1123 and was incorporated into Unterlenningen 1939. Brucken has 1026 inhabitants (Stand 31. Dezember 2012).

=== Gutenberg ===
In 1285 Gutenberg was first mentioned. It received the rights of a town during Thirty Years' War the place lost so many people, they lost town rights. Gutenberg nowadays has 676 inhabitants (Stand 31. Dezember 2012).

=== Hochwang ===
After world War II many refugees came to the Lenningen valley from former Eastern German regions. First they came in houses of residents. Because ground is small in the valley, in 1951 the managers of papermill Scheufele thought we need buildings for these people and workers. So the idea was born to build houses on the Swabian Alb. Work started with building a road, more than 100 people worked for 30 months. The road was opened 1954. Building the houses started in September 1952, till 1971 184 houses with 312 apartments, 62 garages were built. The total cost was 9,2 Mio. DM (4,7 Mio€.). At this time the population of Hochwang was 1/3 residents and 2/3 refugees. Nowadays 681 people live in Hochwang (Stand 31. Dezember 2012).

=== Oberlenningen ===
Oberlenningen was first mentioned around 1100. Oberlenningen has 2,507 inhabitants (Stand 31. December 2012)

=== Schlattstall ===
Schlattstall was first mentioned 1384. Since 1. January 1971 it belongs to Oberlenningen. In Schlattstall live today 168 people (Stand 31. Dezember 2012).

=== Schopfloch ===
Schopfloch was first mentioned in 1152. In the Thirty Years' War, the place was so destroyed that the number of inhabitants fell from 100 to 40. As of 31 December 2012, Schopfloch has 683 inhabitants.

=== Unterlenningen ===
Unterlenningen was a unit with Oberlenningen. They separated 1353, reunion was 1975 in Unterlenningen live 2.223 Menschen (Stand 31. Dezember 2012).

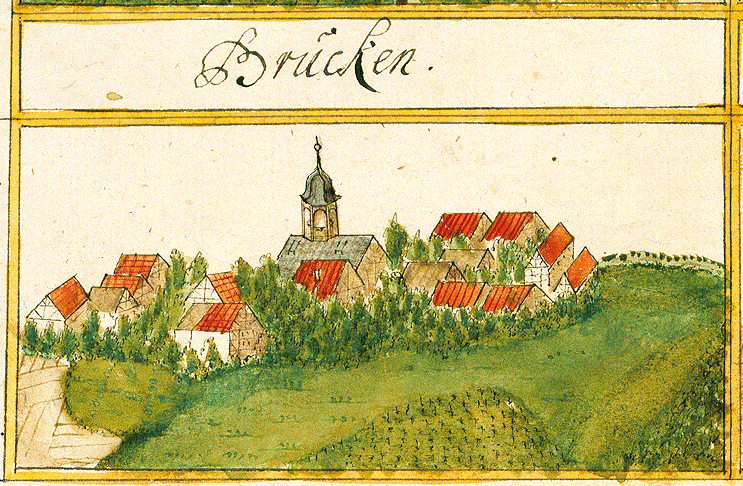
Brucken
