= Unterensingen =

- Municipality
- Coat of arms

- Location of Unterensingen within Esslingen district
- Interactive map of Unterensingen
- Location within Germany Location within Baden-Württemberg
- Coordinates: 48°39′21″N 9°21′20″E
- Country: Germany
- State: Baden-Württemberg
- Admin. region: Stuttgart
- District: Esslingen

Government
  - Mayor (2017–25): Sieghart Friz (CDU)

Area
  - Total: 7.56 km^{2} (2.92 sq mi)
- Elevation: 288 m (945 ft)

Population (2025-12-31)
  - Total: 4,938
  - Density: 653/km^{2} (1,690/sq mi)
- Time zone: UTC+01:00 (CET)
  - Summer (DST): UTC+02:00 (CEST)
- Postal codes: 72669
- Dialling codes: 07022
- Vehicle registration: ES
- Website: www.unterensingen.de

Unterensingen (Swabian: Ondorẽseng) is a municipality in the district of Esslingen in Baden-Württemberg in southern Germany.

== Geography ==
It is located 19 km southeast of Stuttgart.
