= Schlaitdorf =

- Municipality
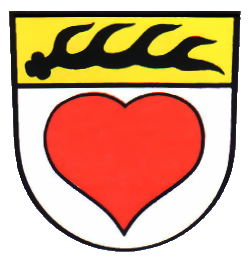
- Coat of arms

- Location of Schlaitdorf within Esslingen district
- Interactive map of Schlaitdorf
- Location within Germany Location within Baden-Württemberg
- Coordinates: 48°36′13″N 9°13′28″E
- Country: Germany
- State: Baden-Württemberg
- Admin. region: Stuttgart
- District: Esslingen

Government
  - Mayor (2019–27): Sascha Richter (Ind.)

Area
  - Total: 7.31 km^{2} (2.82 sq mi)
- Elevation: 401 m (1,316 ft)

Population (2025-12-31)
  - Total: 1,900
  - Density: 260/km^{2} (670/sq mi)
- Time zone: UTC+01:00 (CET)
  - Summer (DST): UTC+02:00 (CEST)
- Postal codes: 72667
- Dialling codes: 07127
- Vehicle registration: ES
- Website: www.schlaitdorf.de

Schlaitdorf (German pronunciation: [ˈʃlaɪtdɔʁf]) is a municipality in the district of Esslingen in Baden-Württemberg in southern Germany.
