= Weilheim an der Teck =

- Town
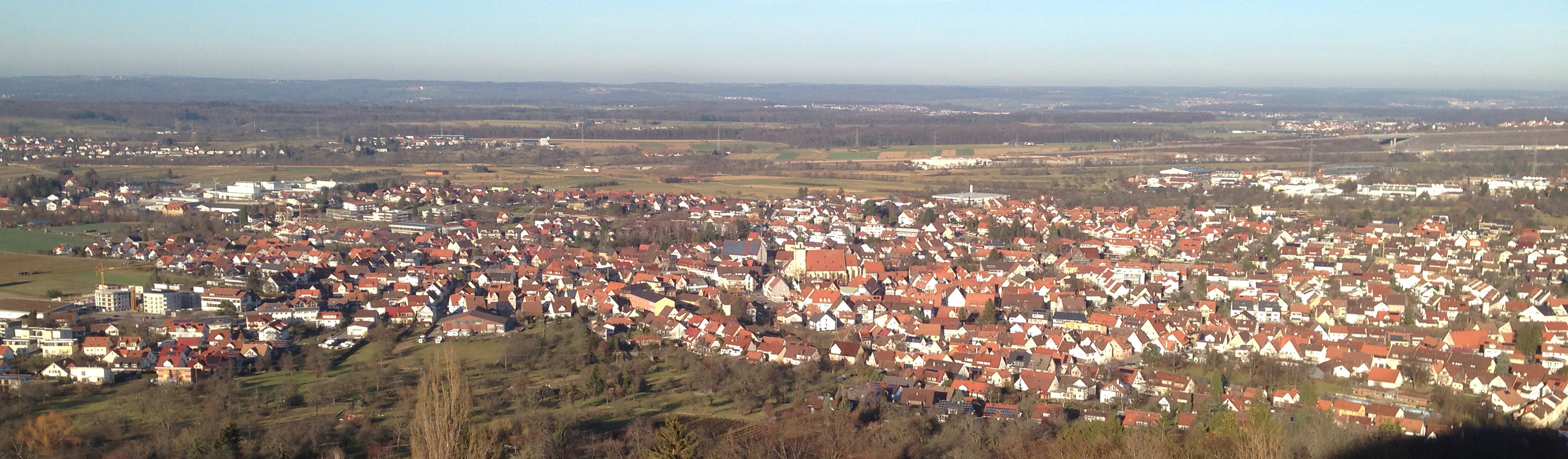
- Panorama of the town

- Coat of arms

- Location of Weilheim an der Teck within Esslingen district
- Interactive map of Weilheim an der Teck
- Location within Germany Location within Baden-Württemberg
- Coordinates: 48°36′54″N 9°32′19″E
- Country: Germany
- State: Baden-Württemberg
- Admin. region: Stuttgart
- District: Esslingen
- Subdivisions: 3

Government
  - Mayor (2017–25): Johannes Züfle (FW)

Area
  - Total: 26.51 km^{2} (10.24 sq mi)
- Elevation: 385 m (1,263 ft)

Population (2025-12-31)
  - Total: 10,007
  - Density: 377.5/km^{2} (977.7/sq mi)
- Time zone: UTC+01:00 (CET)
  - Summer (DST): UTC+02:00 (CEST)
- Postal codes: 73231–73235
- Dialling codes: 07023
- Vehicle registration: ES
- Website: www.weilheim-teck.de

Weilheim an der Teck (German pronunciation: [ˈvaɪlhaɪm ʔan deːɐ̯ ˈtɛk], lit. 'Weilheim on the Teck') is a town in the district of Esslingen in Baden-Württemberg in southern Germany. It is situated 7 km southeast of Kirchheim unter Teck, and 13 km southwest of Göppingen. Locals often refer to it as just "Weilheim", although there are in fact several "Weilheims" in Germany including one other in Baden-Württemberg.

== History ==
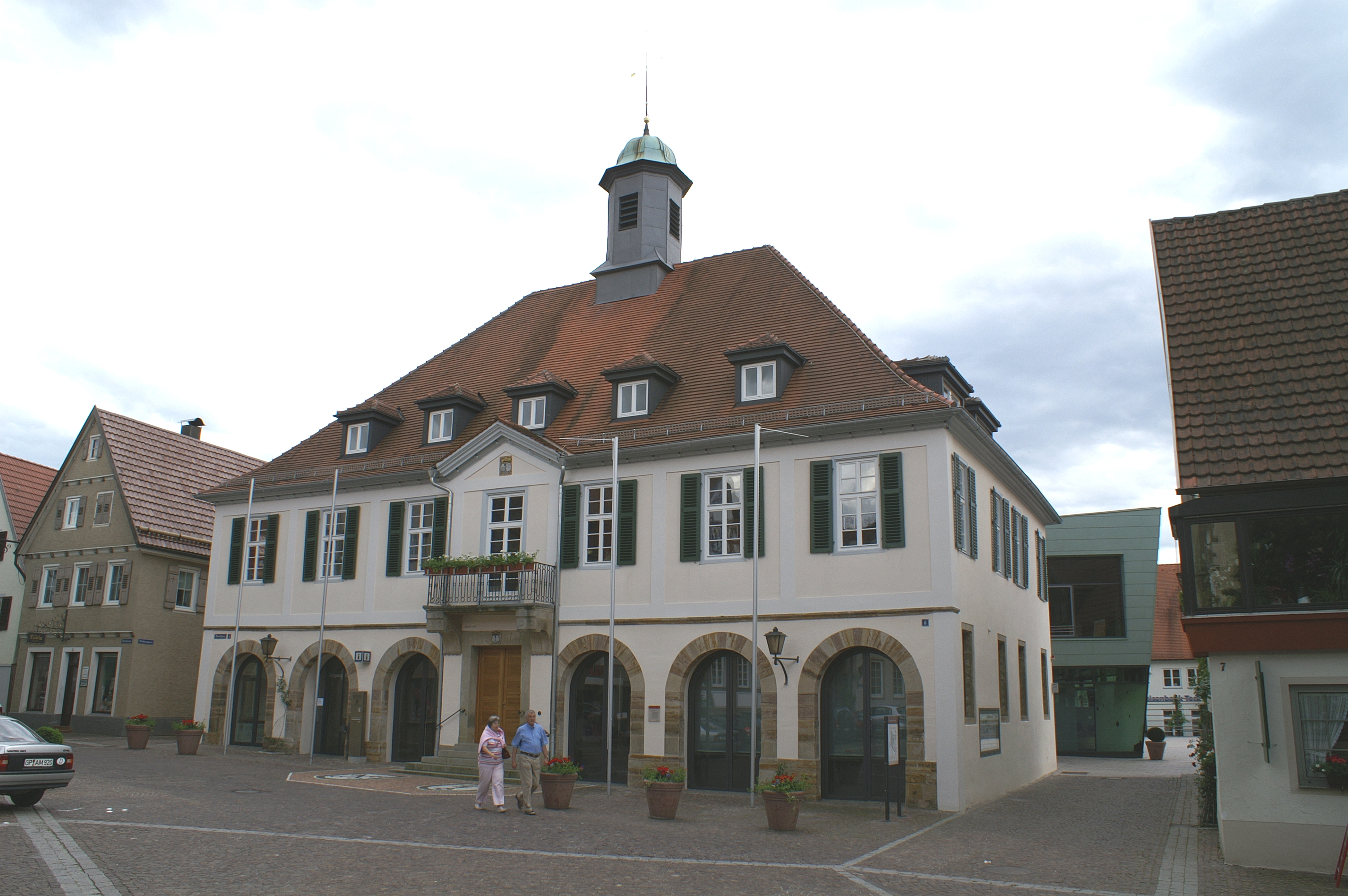
Weilheim, Old Town Hall

Weilheim an der Teck in Esslingen district

Finds from prehistoric and ancient times indicate a very early settlement of Weilheim space. The oldest written mention of the place can be found on 1 October 769 in a deed of Lorsch Abbey. In the years 1050 to 1070 founded Berthold II, Duke of Carinthia of the House of Zähringen the Limburg and a provost in Weilheim, which remained during 20 years the headquarter of the House of Zährigen.

In 1319 count Ulrich of Aichelberg rose Weilheim to a city, which was fortified and rapidly gained importance because of the market law. 1334 sold Graf Brun of Kirchberg the place for 7,500 guilders to the House of Württemberg. 1432 in turn sold Peter von Liebenstein and his son-in-law Kaspar Schlats the pledge shank to Hans of Wernau. In 1461 a fire destroyed the core city. 1489 the Peterskirche (Peter church) was built with its great variety of equipment in late Gothic style. From the Reformation, the town was the location of a Protestant church and was assigned to the administrative of Oberamt of Kirchheim until its abolition. In the years 1634-1638 the plague raged in the city, 1505 people died. During the Thirty Years' War Swedish troops looted the place in 1647.

The town hall was built on the marketplace in 1777. In 2009 a modern designed building with underground parking was erected.

The town was entirely a farming community until mid-19th century. At the end of the 19th century industrial development began hesitantly. In 1858 the post-Kirchheim Weilheim was set up. In 1884 a weaving plant was built, the first larger industrial company. In 1908 the railway Kirchheim (Teck) south-Weilheim (Teck) was put into operation. The passenger transport ended on September 25, 1982, the freight transport ended in 1986. From 1922 to 1924, the urban water supply was established through water pipes. From 1934 to 1937, the A 8 motorway was built, which runs through the district in the far north.

From 1938 to Weilheim was part of the Nürtingen oberamtage, since 1973 to that of Esslingen. Since 1975 exists an administration unit with the communities Bissingen, Holzmaden, Neidlingen and Ohmden. On the Boßler, a rock, crashed since 1940 several planes through impact with the abruptly rising mountain.

== Mayors ==
- 1889–1916: Stadtschultheiß Scheu
- 1916–1937: Karl Schmid
- 1937–1972: Georg Kandenwein
- 1972–2009: Hermann Bauer (Free voters)
- since April 2009: Johannes Züfle (independent)

None of the candidates could reach the majority (Elections January 29, 2017).

== Incorporations ==
On 1 January 1972, Hepsisau was incorporated into Weilheim. The coat of arms from 1952 shows in blue a golden oblique right beams, covered with a natural cherry twig. Hepsisau was located 4 kilometers from Weilheim located on the escarpment and had about 750 inhabitants.

== Transportation ==
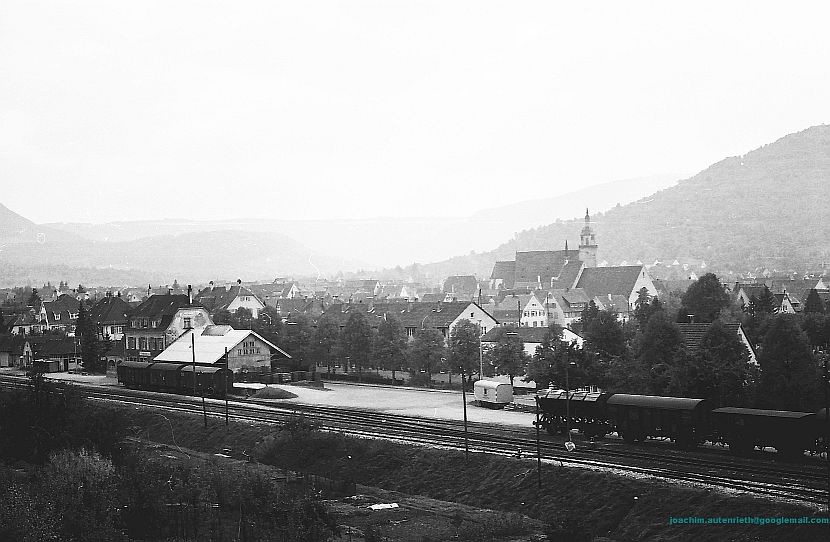
Weilheim station 1963

The road L 1200 comes from Neidlingen in the southeast and continues to Kirchheim unter Teck in the northwest. The L 1252 connects westward with Dettingen unter Teck. L 1214 towards Aichelberg leads to the A8. The road L 1213 leads to Gruibingen. From 1908 to 1995 was a railway branch line from Kirchheim (Teck) to Weilheim. Since 1982 Kirchheim (Teck) is the next railway station for passengers.

== Viticulture ==
Weilheim is the most south-eastern foothill of the wine-growing region Württemberg.

== Established businesses ==
- Karl Fischer, earthmoving, demolition, transport work
- Hans Fischer Transport, nationally active forwarding and logistics company
- Wilhelm Kächele, leading manufacturer of specialty rubbers and rubber-metal connections
- Kurt Hack (Euro Tramp trampolines), trampoline manufacturer

== Educational institutions ==
In addition to the Realschule and the elementary and secondary school with Werkrealschule there is with the Limburg school a primary school in the city. A special school completes the education offer. The high school students of the community relate to high schools in Kirchheim unter Teck. Furthermore, there are five local municipal kindergarten, the "free kindergarten Weilheim and the forest kindergarten Weilheim. The public library has a stock of about 28,000 media and had in 2012 142,000 loans. Since 1 July 2013, " eLibrary " with e-books was introduced.

== Leisure and sports facilities ==
- The Lindach Stadium, home of the Sports Club Weilheim with adjacent tennis- and football fields, a basketball court, a bike park and a skate park.
- Sports ground Egelsberg (football ground)
- Riding facility (Egelsberg)

== Points of interest ==
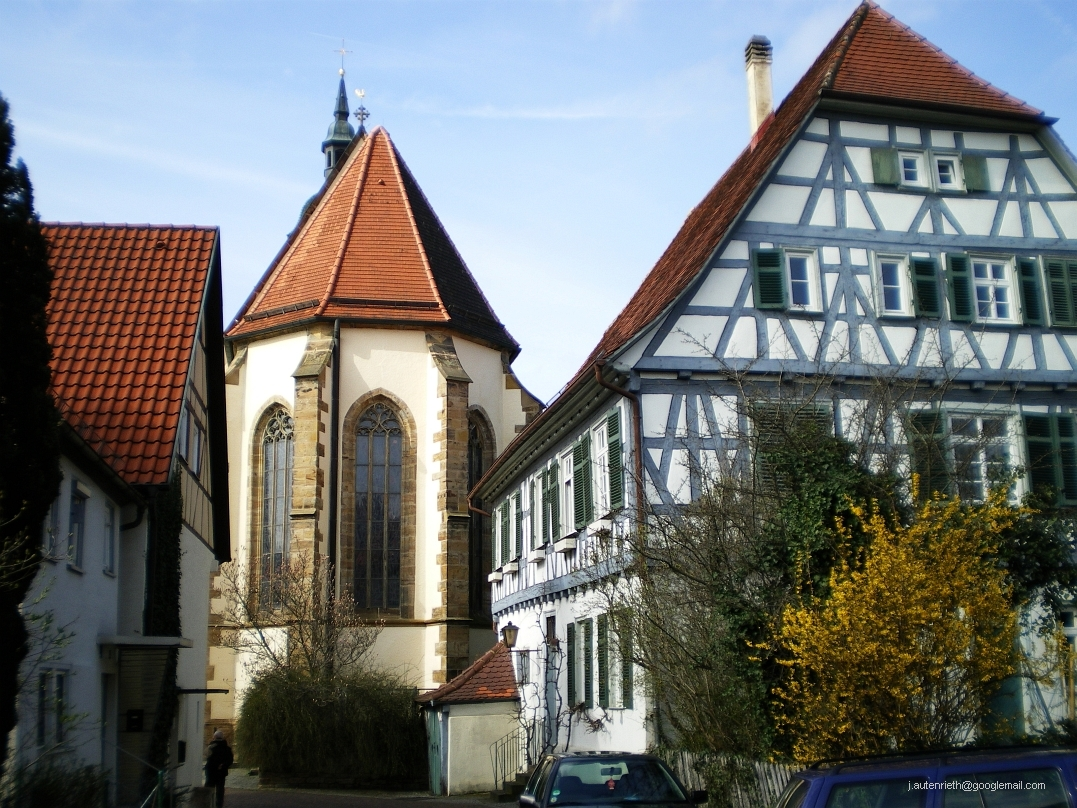
Parson House and Church

=== Buildings ===
- The St. Peter's with a lot of fittings was built in 1489 in late Gothic style and is now a cultural monument.
- Kapuzinerhaus
- Bürgerhaus
- The town hall on the market square was built in 1777

== Regular events ==
- Städtlesfest, every year on the first Sunday in July
- Village festival in Hepsisau, every year on the first Sunday in September
- Cherry blossom festival in April
- Advent market, every year on the 2nd Sunday of Advent

== Personality ==
- Painter Johann Moritz Rugendas, died here in 1858
- Freeman Christian Mali (1832-1906), professor and painter
- Emil Paillard (1859-1945), doctor
- Georg Kandenwein, mayor from 1937 to 1972
- Karl Gottlob Dreher (1886-1979), teacher, author of the books Weilheim/Teck, then and now, Volume I + II

== Sons and daughters of the city ==
- The Schieffelin family has ancestors in Weilheim an der Teck.
- Friedrich von Gerok (1786-1865), theologian, General Superintendent of Ludwigsburg, Member of Parliament
- Richard Döcker (1864-1968), architect
- Jannik Steimle (April 4, 1996), a German cyclist

== Personalities who have worked locally ==
- Joseph Schwarz (1910-1985), displaced politician (CDU), Member of Parliament, lived in Weilheim and was also council
- Gerhard Dreher (1924-2008), a freelance visual artist, lived for a long time in Weilheim

== Literature ==
- Christoph Bizer: Hepsisau – aus der Geschichte eines Dorfes am Fuße der Alb. Hrsg. von der Stadt Weilheim a. d. Teck, 1987, ISBN 3-9800255-2-7.
- Karl Dreher: Weilheim an der Teck einst und jetzt. A. Gottliebs & J. Oßwalds Buchdruckereien, Kirchheim unter Teck 1939
- Hans Schwenkel: Heimatbuch des Kreises Nürtingen. Band 2, Würzburg 1953, S. 1173–1217.
- Ulrich Marstaller: Die Peterskirche in Weilheim. Konrad Theiss Verlag, Stuttgart 1985, ISBN 3-8062-0436-5.
- Der Landkreis Esslingen (Band 2). Hrsg. vom Landesarchiv Baden-Württemberg i. V. mit dem Landkreis Esslingen, Jan Thorbecke Verlag, Ostfildern 2009, ISBN 978-3-7995-0842-1, Seite 437.
- Manfred Waßner u. a.: Die Geschichte der Stadt an der Limburg. Weilheim an der Teck 2007, ISBN 978-3-00-021110-2.
