= Teck Railway =

Railway line in Germany

Overview
- Native name: Teckbahn
- Line number: 4610 Wendlingen–Oberlenningen; 4611 Kirchheim–Weilheim
- Locale: Baden-Württemberg, Germany

Service
- Route number: 761

Technical
- Line length: 17.422 km (10.826 mi)
- Track gauge: 1,435 mm (4 ft 8 1/2 in) standard gauge
- Electrification: 15 kV/16.7 Hz AC overhead catenary

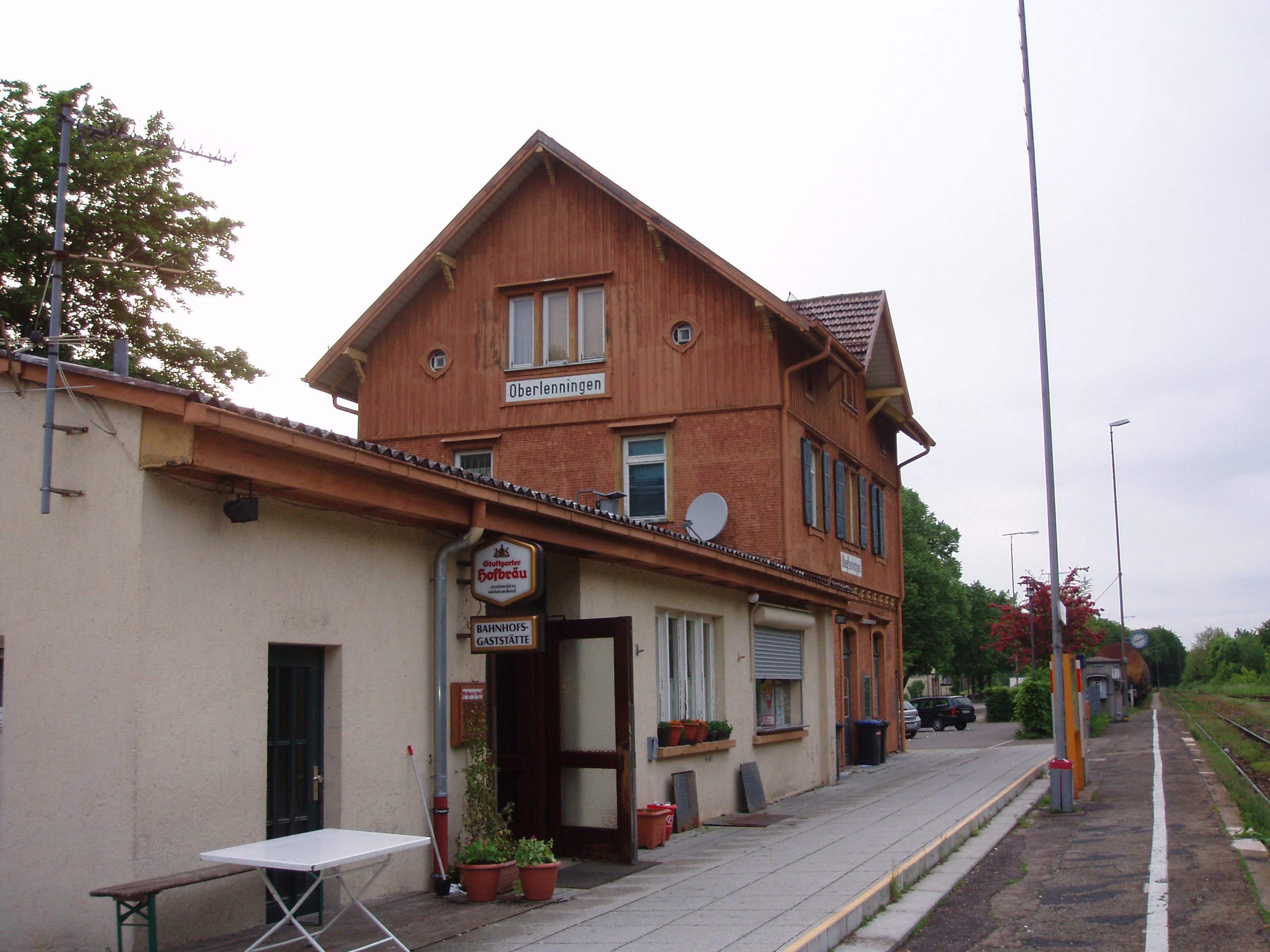
Oberlenningen station (railhead)

The Teck Railway (German: Teckbahn) is a branch line in the German state of Baden-Württemberg, connecting Wendlingen am Neckar with Kirchheim unter Teck and Oberlenningen. In Deutsche Bahn’s timetable it has route number 761. A branch line once ran from Kirchheim to Weilheim an der Teck, but it is now closed.

== History ==
The section from Wendlingen (then called Unterboihingen) to Kirchheim opened on 21 September 1864. Its original operator was the Kirchheim Railway Company (Kirchheimer Eisenbahn-Gesellschaft), which was the first private railway company in Württemberg. It was later taken over by the Royal Württemberg State Railways. On 1 October 1899, the first train ran to Oberlenningen after the line had been extended there.

In 1975, a large section of the line was moved in Kirchheim, the old station near to the centre of the town was abandoned and a new station was built on the southern outskirts. A shopping centre (the Teck-Center), was built on the site of the old station and the old track, which partly ran through the local streets, was abandoned.

Until December 2009, the line was a single track, non-electrified line operated by DB Regio, with services from Wendlingen to Kirchheim twice an hour and from there to Oberlenningen once an hour. Some morning and evening trains ran to and from Plochingen. The service was operated with class 650 diesel multiple units and locomotive-hauled trains (consisting of a class 218 diesel locomotive and three Silberling carriages). The vehicles were operated by DB ZugBus Regionalverkehr Alb-Bodensee (RAB), a subsidiary of DB Regio.

There had long been a proposal to connect the Teck Railway to the Stuttgart S-Bahn network and thus prolong the S-Bahn line S1 from Plochingen Wendlingen to Kirchheim. In early 2008, after several years of planning, the Verband Region Stuttgart (Stuttgart Region Organisation), which coordinates public transport in the Stuttgart Region, concluded a contract for rail services with Deutsche Bahn for the construction and financing of the line. Then from July 2008 until the start of the December 2009 timetable, the line between Wendlingen and Kirchheim was electrified and modernised, with line closures during the two intervening summer holiday seasons. In Wendlingen, the lead at the junction with the Neckar-Alb Railway was doubled to allow the S-Bahn trains to use the platforms appropriate to their direction of operation. A new train storage area was created in Kirchheim for terminating trains.

== Branch line ==
The 7.74-kilometre-long branch line from Kirchheim (Teck) South over Jesingen and Holzmaden to Weilheim an der Teck was opened in 1908. The last scheduled passenger train ran on this section on September 25, 1982. On March 31, 1988, the Holzmaden–Weilheim section was also closed for freight. The Kirchheim–Holzmaden section was served by freight services until September 25, 1994. The section after the 5.5 km mark (just past Holzmaden station) has been dismantled and is partly converted to a foot or bike path. The Kirchheim–Holzmaden section is still usable but it is not used.

The five-kilometre section from Kirchheim unter Teck South station to Holzmaden station will eventually be reactivated for work trains for the new Wendlingen–Ulm high-speed railway. Excavated material from the new line (including the tunnels) will be carried on the A 8 to Holzmaden via a highway exit dedicated to this traffic. There the excavated material will be loaded on to rail wagons to continue its journey. Kirchheim station has a set of points that would allow the extension of the S-Bahn along the line to Holzmaden.

== Current operations ==
Services on the extension of the S1 from Plochingen to Kirchheim unter Teck commenced on December 13, 2009. Since then Wernau, Wendlingen, Ötlingen and Kirchheim have been served every half-hour by class 423 electric multiple units. Up to this point the line is electrified and is built for a top speed of 100 km/h. Passengers have to transfer at Kirchheim station to continue towards Oberlenningen. Between Kirchheim and Oberlenningen hourly services are formed of class 650 diesel multiple units operated by DB ZugBus Regionalverkehr Alb-Bodensee. On this section the speed is limited to 60 km/h.

The transport authority for regional and S-Bahn traffic on the Teck Railway is the Verband Region Stuttgart (VRS). The section from Kirchheim to Oberlenningen is one of three regional lines that VRS is responsible for; the others are the Schuster Railway and the Backnang–Ludwigsburg line. Until a few years ago the line was the responsibility of Nahverkehrsgesellschaft Baden-Württemberg (Regional Transport Company of Baden-Württemberg, NVBW).

Between Wendlingen and Kirchheim, the line has colour light signals and is controlled from two interlockings in Wendlingen and Kirchheim. Safe working on the Kirchheim–Oberlenningen section operates under the system known as Zugleitbetrieb ("train control"), which is used in Germany on simple routes.

Freight also plays an important role on the Teck Railway. Trains run several times a day to the Papierfabrik Scheufelen (Scheufelen paper mill) in Oberlenningen and several times a week to a scrap dealer in Dettingen unter Teck. The freight yard at Oberlenningen station is relatively large for a secondary line and has its own Class V 60 diesel shunter.

Freight is now operated exclusively with class 294 diesel locomotives. The class 218 locomotives formerly used have not been in systematic use since 11 December 2009.

== Planning ==
Modernising the section from Kirchheim to Oberlenningen by increasing speeds and upgrading the technical safety of railway crossings would improve connections with the S-Bahn in Kirchheim. There are no concrete plans at this time.

The Regional Transportation Plan for the Stuttgart region of 2001 identified a rail link between Göppingen and Kirchheim unter Teck, connecting the abandoned tracks of the Voralb Railway (Voralbbahn) with the Teck Railway, and classified it as of "high urgency".
