= Holzmaden =

- Municipality
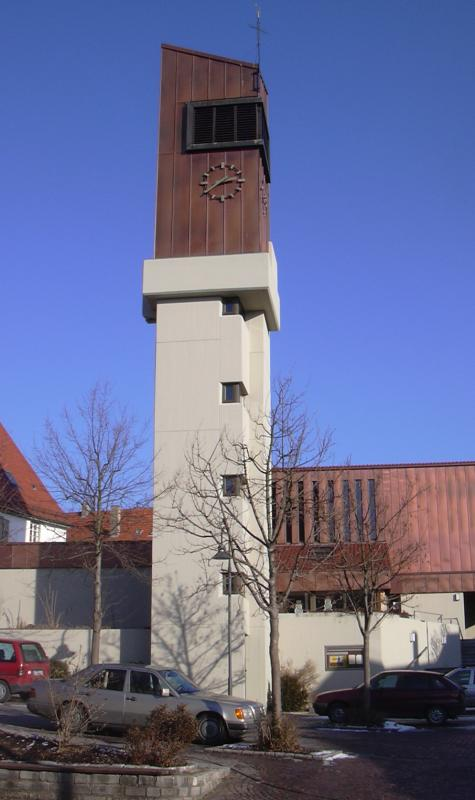

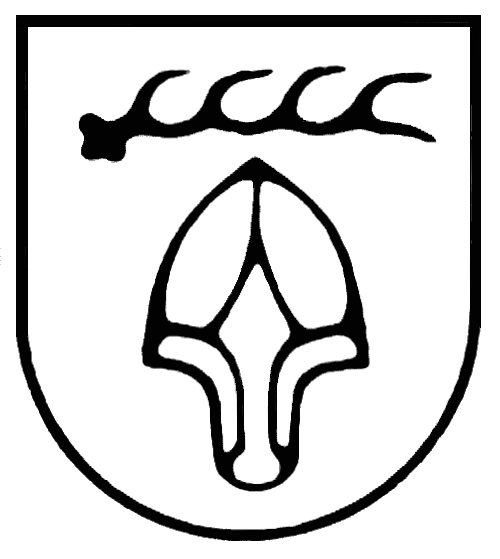
- Coat of arms

- Location of Holzmaden within Esslingen district
- Interactive map of Holzmaden
- Location within Germany Location within Baden-Württemberg
- Coordinates: 48°38′1″N 9°31′2″E
- Country: Germany
- State: Baden-Württemberg
- Admin. region: Stuttgart
- District: Esslingen

Government
  - Mayor (2021–29): Florian Schepp

Area
  - Total: 3.09 km^{2} (1.19 sq mi)
- Elevation: 356 m (1,168 ft)

Population (2025-12-31)
  - Total: 2,249
  - Density: 728/km^{2} (1,890/sq mi)
- Time zone: UTC+01:00 (CET)
  - Summer (DST): UTC+02:00 (CEST)
- Postal codes: 73271
- Dialling codes: 07023
- Vehicle registration: ES
- Website: www.holzmaden.de

Holzmaden is a town in Baden-Württemberg, Germany that lies between Stuttgart and Ulm. Holzmaden is 4 km south-east from Kirchheim unter Teck and 19 km south-east of Esslingen am Neckar. The A 8 runs south from Holzmaden. The town and surrounding area are well known as the source of exceptionally well-preserved fossils from the Jurassic period.

== Demographics ==
Date	Population
1671	43
1750	219
3 December 1834¹	488
3 December 1861¹	557
1 December 1900¹	564
17 May 1939¹	697
29 October 1946¹	988
13 September 1950¹	1,063

Date	Population
6 June 1961¹	1,290
27 May 1970¹	1,520
25 May 1987¹	1,646
31 December 1990	1,765
31 December 1995	1,909
31 December 2000	2,068
31 December 2005	2,145
31 December 2010	2,131

1=census results

=== Mayors ===
- Christian Burkhardt (1945–1952)
- Otto Vogt (1952–1982)
- Jürgen Berner (1982–1998)
- Jürgen Riehle (1998–2014)
- Susanne Jakob (2014–2021)
- Florian Schepp (since 2021)

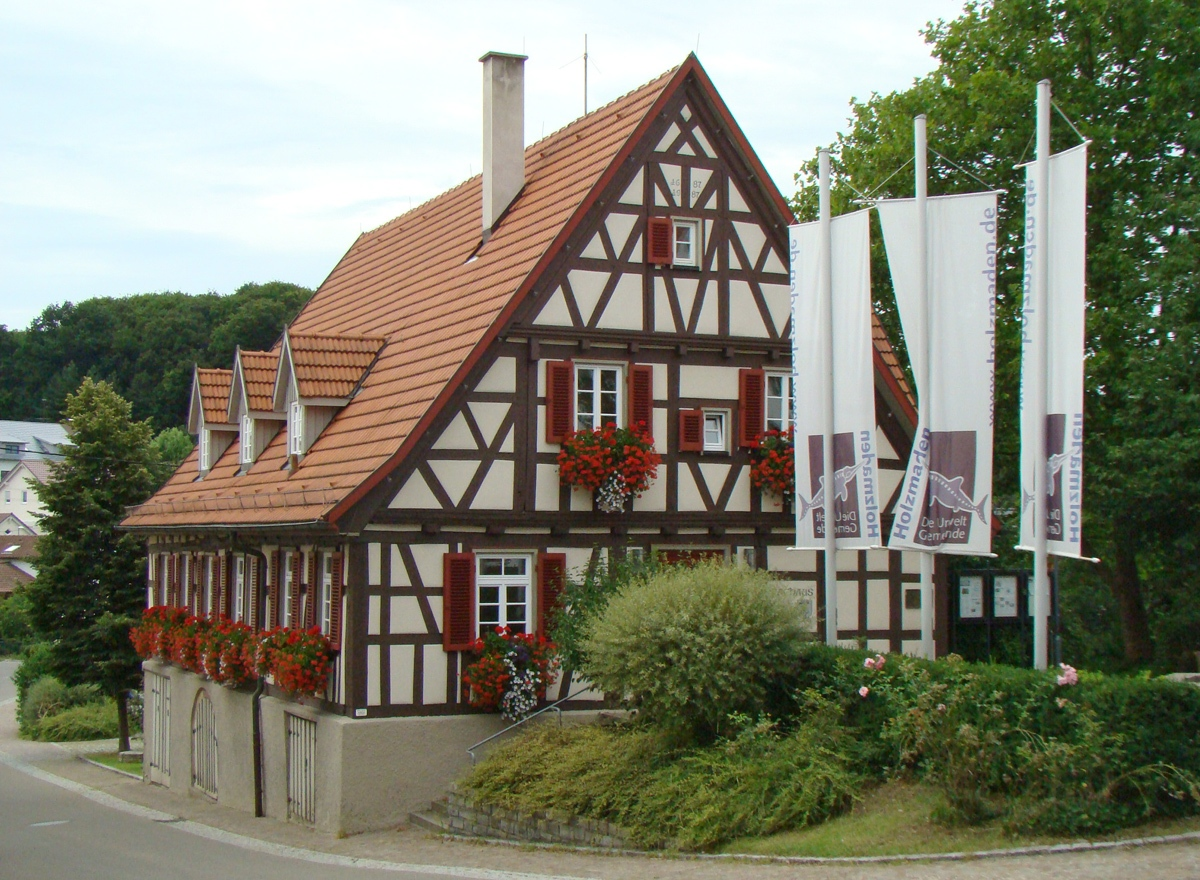
Holzmaden-Town hall

== Infrastructure and facilities ==
The community is located north of the Bundesautobahn 8, halfway between Ulm and Stuttgart; the next junction is Aichelberg.

The railway Kirchheim (Teck) Süd-Weilheim (Teck) connected Holzmaden to the railway network. Passenger traffic was discontinued in 1982 and freight in 1995. Holzmaden also has a primary school, two kindergartens, a community hall with integrally joined forming gym and a sports and leisure facility.

=== Associations and Organizations ===
The association's work is an essential factor in the social life in Holzmaden.

== Notable people from Holzmaden ==
- Bernhard Hauff (1866–1950), founder of museum Hauff
- Heinz Kälberer (born 1942), former Lord mayor of Vaihingen an der Enz

== Fossils ==
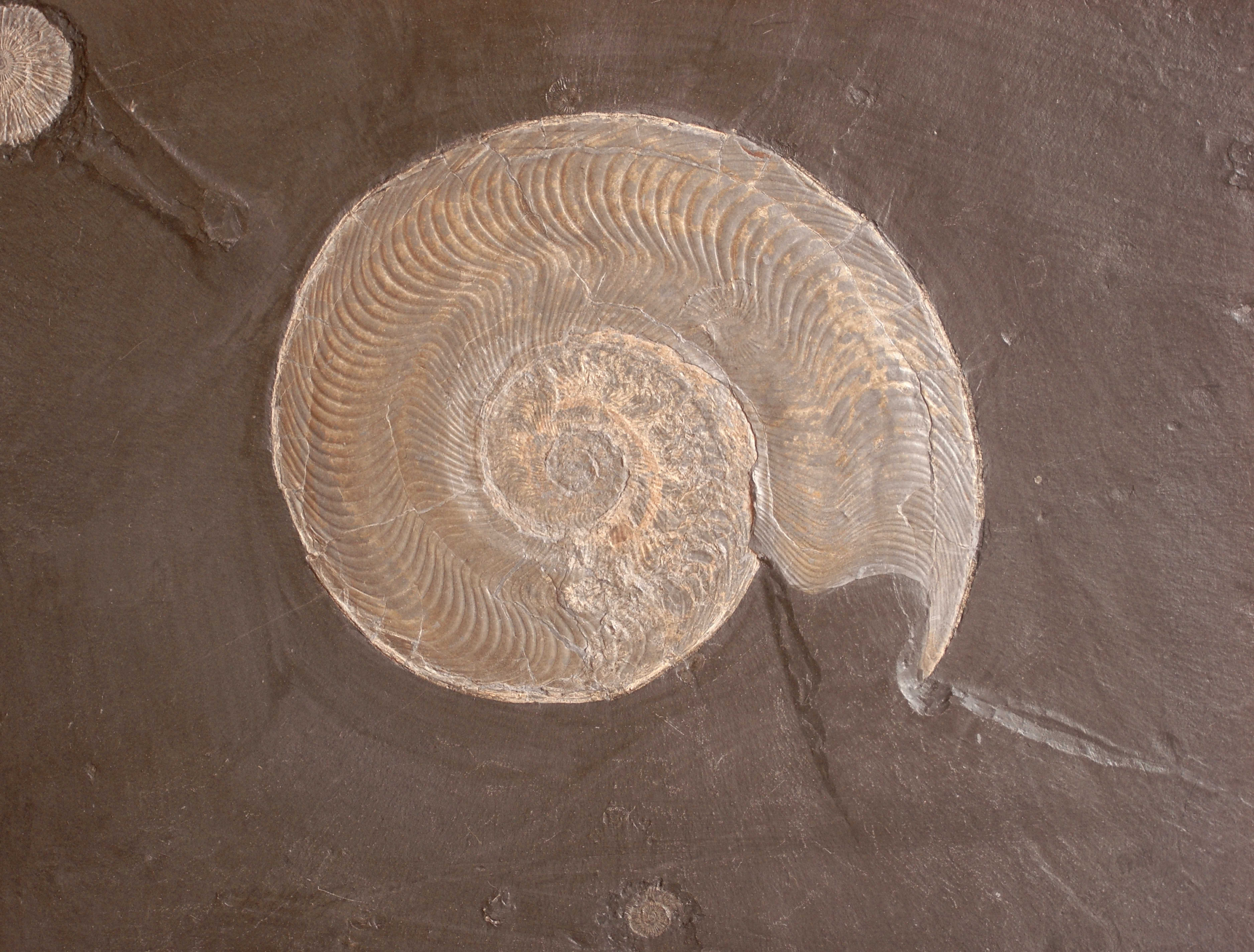
Harpoceras falcifer from the Holzmaden Lagerstätte

The ground in and around the city contains rich layers of well-preserved fossils (or Lagerstätten) of the Jurassic period. The fossils are found in the 180-million-year-old Posidonia Shale and displayed in the local Museum Hauff as well as museums around the world. This locale is important for its frequent preservation of soft tissue, a rarity in fossils.

Examples from this site include:

- Ichthyosaurs
- Plesiosaurs
- Steneosaurus
- Platysuchus
- Lepidotus
- Dapedius
- Ammonite
- Pentacrinus colony (Sea Lily)
