= Wendlingen =

- Town
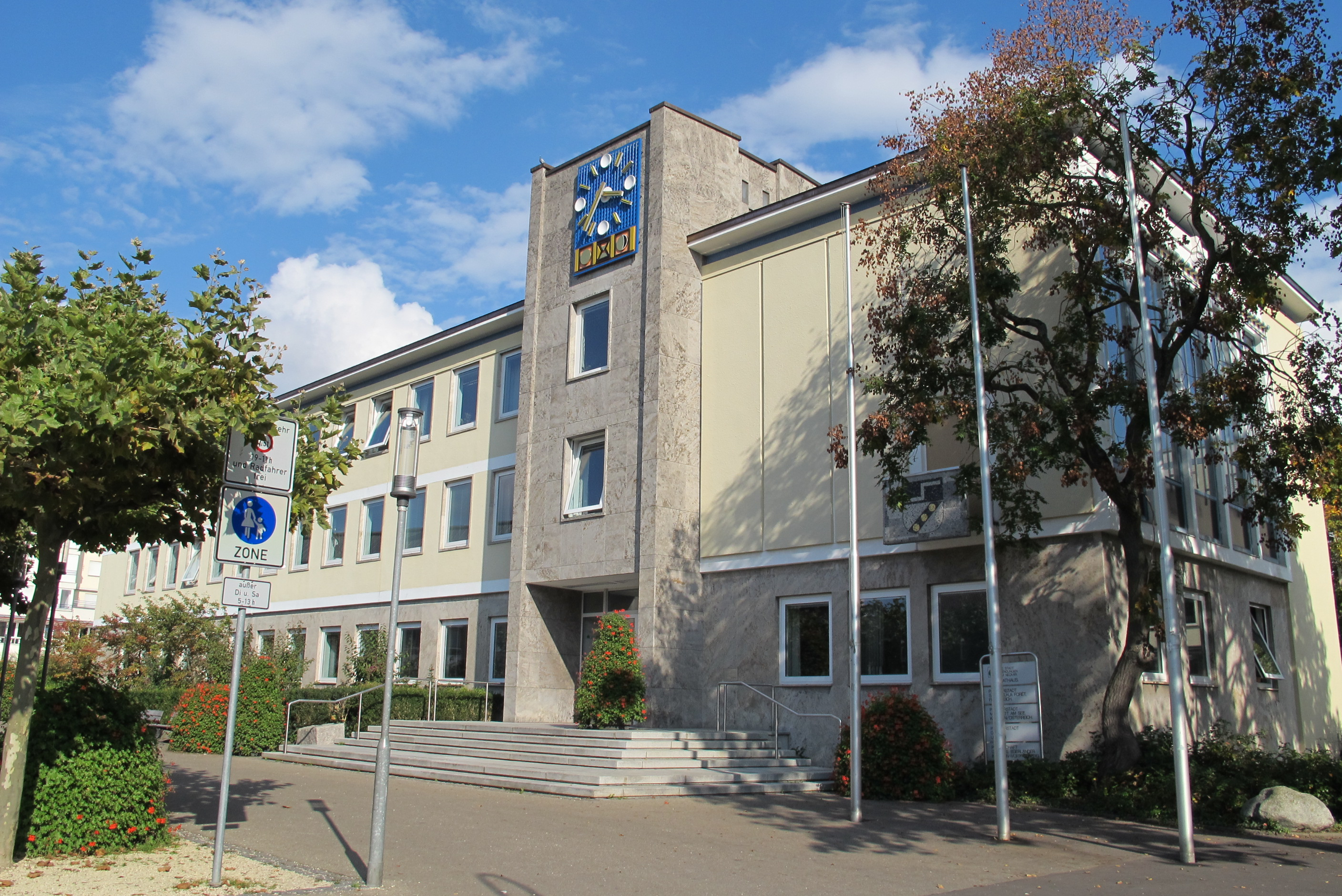
- Town hall

- Coat of arms

- Location of Wendlingen within Esslingen district
- Interactive map of Wendlingen
- Location within Germany Location within Baden-Württemberg
- Coordinates: 48°40′29″N 9°22′54″E
- Country: Germany
- State: Baden-Württemberg
- Admin. region: Stuttgart
- District: Esslingen
- Subdivisions: 3

Government
  - Mayor (2019–27): Steffen Weigel (SPD)

Area
  - Total: 12.15 km^{2} (4.69 sq mi)
- Elevation: 294 m (965 ft)

Population (2025-12-31)
  - Total: 16,002
  - Density: 1,317/km^{2} (3,411/sq mi)
- Time zone: UTC+01:00 (CET)
  - Summer (DST): UTC+02:00 (CEST)
- Postal codes: 73240
- Dialling codes: 07024
- Vehicle registration: ES
- Website: www.wendlingen.de

Wendlingen am Neckar (German pronunciation: [ˈvɛndlɪŋən ʔam ˈnɛkaʁ], lit. 'Wendlingen on the Neckar') is a town in the district of Esslingen in Baden-Württemberg in southern Germany. It is situated on the Neckar and Lauter rivers, 27 km southeast of Stuttgart.

The town grew in size, officially, on 1 April 1940, when three separate communities of Wendlingen, Unterboihingen and Bodelshofen merged.

The town also is the headquarters of the tool company Festool.

== Mayors ==
- 1940–1944: Andreas Bauer
- 1944–1945: Emil Hartung
- 1945–1945: Karl Strohmaier (commissarial)
- 1945–1946: Rudolf Bisterfeld (commissarial)
- 1946–1978: Helmut Kaiser
- 1978–1992: Hans Köhler
- 1992–2003: Andreas Hesky
- 2003–2011: Frank Ziegler
- 2011-2019: Steffen Weigel
- Since 2019: Steffen Weigel

== Local council ==
The local council in Wendlingen has 22 members. The mayor is the president of the local council and has one vote. Communal elections in Baden-Württemberg 2014 had the following official results.

Political parties and community voters		% 2014	Sitze 2014	% 2009	Sitze 2009
CDU	Christian Democratic Union of Germany	34,75	8	29,0	6
Greens	Alliance '90/The Greens	23,39	5	23,2	5
FW	Free voters Baden-Württemberg	22,83	5	25,5	6
SPD	Social Democratic Party of Germany	19,03	4	22,3	5
Total		100,0	22	100,0	22
Voter turnout		47,16%		49,3%	

== Notable people ==
- Marianne Erdrich-Sommer (born 1952), German politician (Bündnis 90/Die Grünen), former member of Landtag, Kreistagsabgeordnete, lives in Wendlingen
- Matthias Landfried (born 1975), German national table-tennis trainer
- Andrea Barth (born 1972), World champion, Europe champion, German champion in one wheel art cycling
- Werner Utter (1921–2006), chef-pilot of Lufthansa
- Erwin Behr (1857–1931), entrepreneur for furniture, first producer of wall units
- Robert Otto, manager of Heinrich Otto & Söhne company in Unterboihingen, first cotton spinning in Württemberg
- Alfred Kleefeldt, (born 1933), German athlete, competing in 5000 meters

== International relations ==
Wendlingen is twinned with:

- – Dorog, Hungary
- – Saint-Leu-la-Forêt, France
- – Millstatt, Austria
