= Teck =

Teck may refer to:

- Teck Castle (Burg Teck) in Württemberg, Germany
- Teckberg, mountain on which Teck Castle is located
- Duke of Teck, a title of nobility, associated with Teck Castle
- Teck Railway, Germany
- Teck Resources, a Canadian mining company formerly known as Teck Cominco
- CCL25, a cytokine also known as "Teck"
- Katherine Teck, an American author and composer
- Lai Teck, a Malayan communist leader
- Lim Koon Teck, a Singaporean politician
