= Federbach =

Federbach may refer to:

- Federbach (Alb), a river of Baden-Württemberg, Germany, tributary of the Alb
- Federbach (Lindach), a river of Baden-Württemberg, Germany, tributary of the Lindach
