= Reussenstein Castle =

Ruined medieval fortress in Germany

Coordinates: 48°33′41″N 9°34′02″E

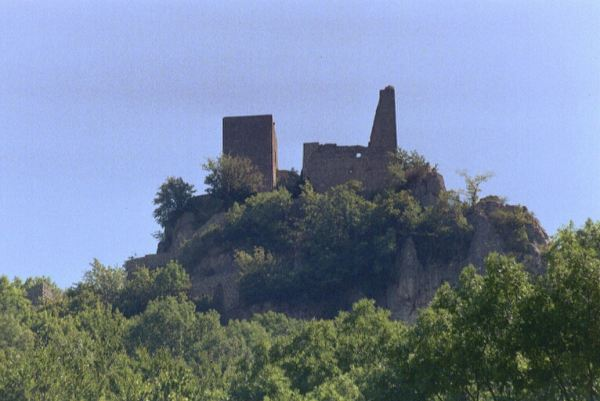
Reussenstein Castle

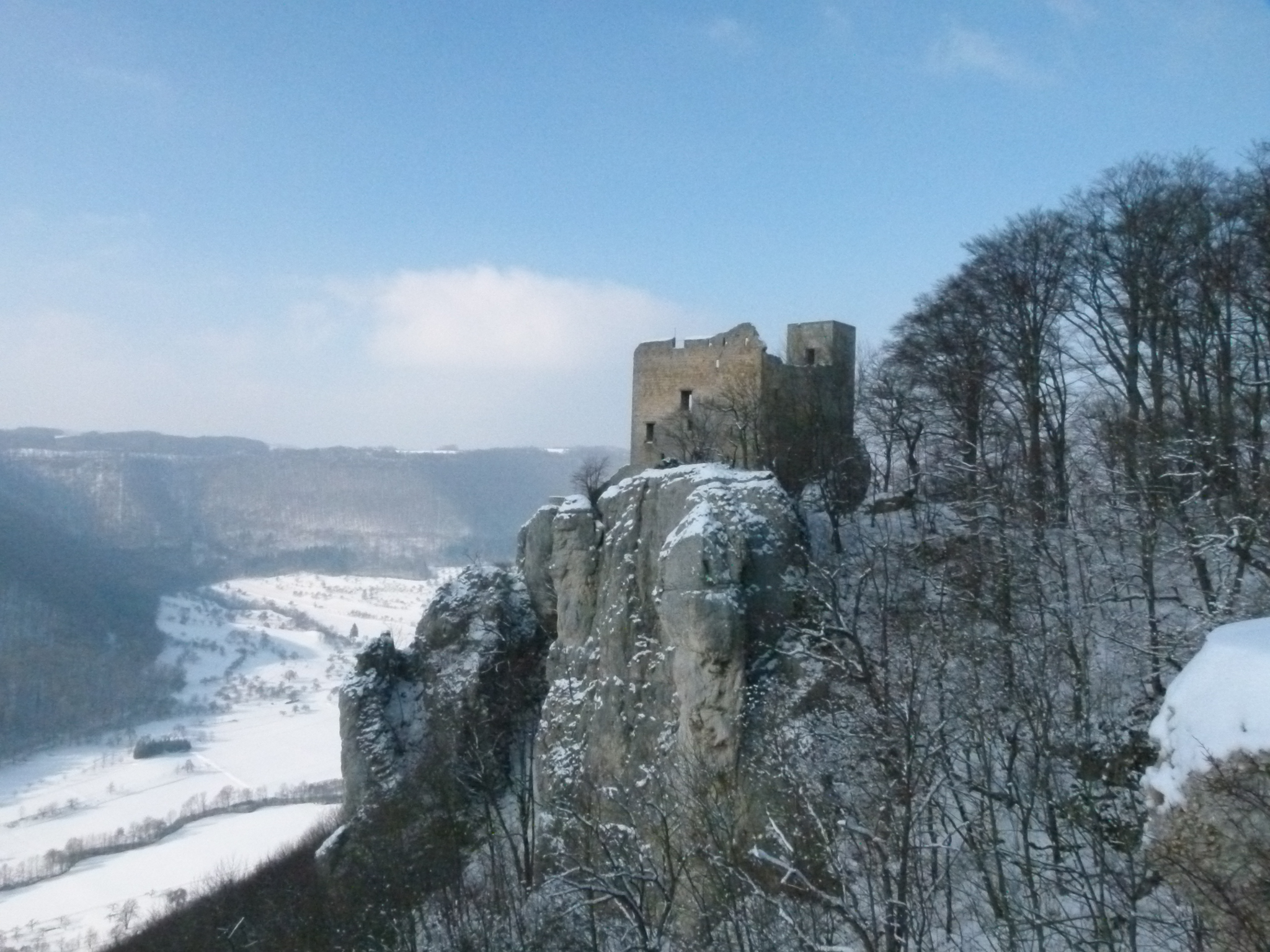
Reussenstein Castle in winter

Reussenstein Castle (Ruine Reußenstein: the Reussenstein Ruin) is ruins of a medieval fortress in Germany. It is situated 760 metres (2,490 ft) above sea level overlooking Neidlingen in Baden-Württemberg, Germany.

== History ==
The castle was built in 1270 as a ministerial castle of the Dukes of Teck in order to watch the only pass into the Swabian Alb from the Neidlingen valley. The knight Diethoh of Kirchheim-Stein was the first known castellan, from approximately 1301. His son sold it to his cousins, Konrad and Heinrich Reuss. The castle was named Reussenstein after this family in 1371.

In the following 50 years, the castle passed through 11 different owners, including the Dukes of Württemberg in 1381. In 1441, the Counts of Helfenstein took possession. The last to live in the castle was Ludwig Helferich of Reussenstein. With the end of the Helfensteins in 1550, the castle became uninhabited and fell into disrepair.

In 1752, it was acquired by the Bavarian Court, but in 1806 became the property of the State of Württemberg. In 1835 King William I of Württemberg gave the castle to his adjutant Colonel von Fleischmann.

In 1846, the last lynx in Germany was hunted in these ruins.

In 1862, the Württemberg royal estates office took over the administration of the castle, which remained in the possession of the former royal family of Württemberg until 1964.

Throughout 1965–1966 the castle was restored by the district of Nürtingen, now included in the district of Esslingen, under the supervision of the Baden-Württemberg Historical Monuments Department.

== Legend ==
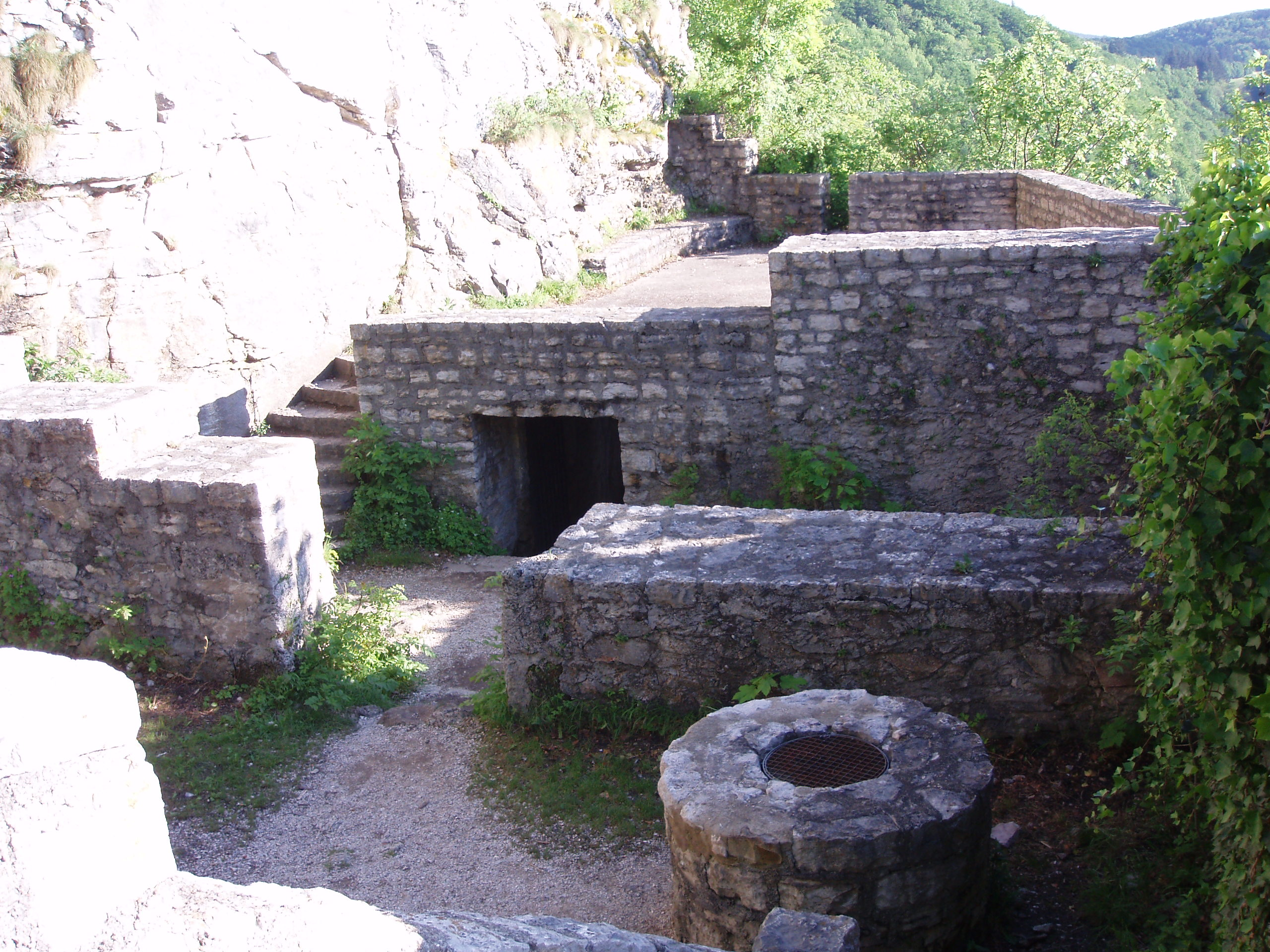
detail of castle ruins

A legend about the origins of the castle was written by Wilhelm Hauff. The legend states that the castle was founded by a giant who had lived in a cave on the opposite side of the valley. In order to arrive at the building site, the giant only had to cross the valley with one large step. However, he did not step far enough and was left with a foot stuck in the marshy valley floor. When he pulled his foot out again, a spring rose from the footprint, which created the Lindach river.

Later, the castle was finished, except for one last nail. However, none of the craftsman dared to hammer in this final nail at such a height. There was only one young craftsman from the Neidlingen valley who dared to try. The giant held the young man to the window over the abyss, until he had finished the work. The craftsman was rewarded with riches and with the hand of the master builder's daughter in marriage.
