= Zipfelbach (Lindach) =

River in Germany

- Mouth of Zipfelbach

Location
- Country: Germany
- State: Baden-Württemberg

Physical characteristics
- Mouth
  - location: Lindach
  - coordinates: 48.6018°N 9.5458°E

Basin features
- Progression: Lindach→ Lauter→ Neckar→ Rhine→ North Sea

Zipfelbach is a river of Baden-Württemberg, Germany. It is a left tributary of the Lindach near Weilheim an der Teck.

== See also ==
- List of rivers of Baden-Württemberg
