= Lautertal Limes =

Roman limes section of the early 2nd century

The Lautertal Limes (in German also: Sibyllenspur or Sybillenspur) is a Roman limes section of the early 2nd century which is located between the River Neckar and the Swabian Jura. It extends for a distance of 23 kilometres (14 mi), running, straight as a die, from the present-day municipality of Köngen on the Neckar (Lat: Grinario) in the northwest to Donnstetten (Lat: Clarenna) in the Swabian Jura to the southeast.

== Research history ==
The 600-metre long crop mark in the form of a long strip, known in German as the Sibyllenspur, in the Lauter valley between Dettingen and Owen under Teck has been known about for a long time. It was interpreted differently in the past, and there is even a legend according to which it was the track of a cart belonging to a sibyl. Soil scientists and geologists thought the strip of land might be a geological discontinuity or an old processional way or a road. The first investigations were carried out in 1976 by soil scientist and geologist, Siegfried Müller, in collaboration with the Schwäbischer Albverein. The results of this study revealed an archaeological site consisting of a straight ditch system, which was classified as Roman as the result of the discover of sherds. The Kirchheim local historian, Eugen Schweitzer, brought to the table the thesis that the Sibyllenspur was a limes and thus part of the great European network of Roman centuriation.

In the dry summer of July 1976, aerial archaeology by Walter Sölter discovered the fortlet on the hill of Hasenhäuslesberg near Donnstetten. This find reinforced the theory of a Roman limes between Köngen and Donnstetten. This was finally confirmed that same year by the then archaeological monument conservationist of the administrative region of Stuttgart, Dieter Planck, who also evaluated the 1976 aerial photographs by Alfred Brugger. However, the thesis of the centuriation network was not able to be proven archaeologically. In 1978 the Sibyllenspur was first named by Eugen Schweitzer as the Limes in the Lautertal, connecting the Neckar Limes from the Roman fort of Köngen to the Alb Limes at Donnstetten Roman Fort. Subsequent studies showed that the "Lautertal Limes" consisted of a palisade and three parallel ditches. Unlike the Upper Germanic-Rhaetian Limes, which was protected by two ditches, the ditches here run on the outside of the palisade.

Aerial photographs by Alfred Brugger uncovered another Roman fort behind the limes at Dettingen unter Teck. Subsequent archaeological finds by the Landesdenkmalamt Baden-Württemberg in 1982 showed that the archaeological find was a Roman military camp intended for the direct protection of the Lautertal Limes.

== Limes ==
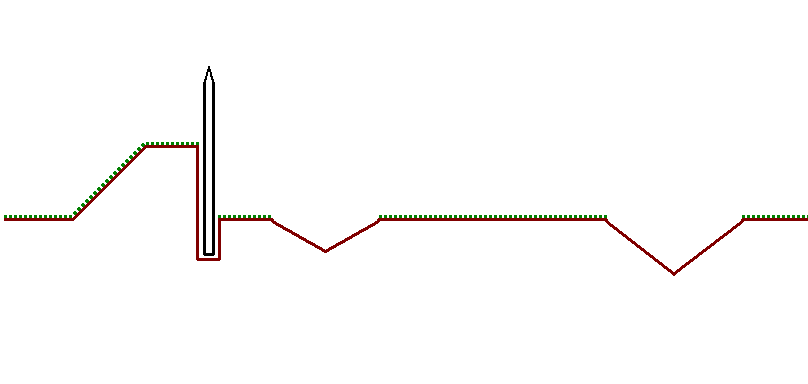
Scale drawing representing an artist's impression of the limes defences in the Lautertal

An excavation by the Landesdenkmalamt Baden-Württemberg in 1982 uncovered the following: the Sibyllenspur comprises three parallel ditches, the outer one in the northeast being a 3.20-metre-wide and 1.60-metre-deep V-shaped ditch. To the southwest, at a distance of 6 metres, is a 2.60-metre-wide and 1.4-metre-deep V-shaped ditch (2) and, behind it, 1.5 metres away, is a 70-cm-wide and 1.10-metre-deep U-shaped ditch (3), into which the wooden posts of a palisade were driven. This presented a wooden obstacle on the enemy side; against which on the inside was probably an earthen bank (vallum). The excavation confirmed the presence of the Roman fortlet, seen on the aerial photograph taken by Dieter Planck, behind the ditches.

During these excavations, two fragments of terra sigillata vessels were found in the ditch. The sigillata were able to be dated to around 120 to 130 AD, based on the manufacturer's seal by the potter, Satto, who worked at the terra sigillata pottery in Chémery-lès-Faulquemont (historically German: Schemmerich) near Faulquemont (German: Falkenberg) in Gallia Belgica. These artefacts classify the Sibyllenspur with its V-shaped ditches and the wood and earth rampart as the long-sought connection between the Domitian Neckar Limes and the Alb Limes.

== Literature ==
Monographies

- Rolf Götz: Die Sibylle von der Teck, Die Sage und ihre Wurzeln im Sibyllenmythos. (Series of papers in the town archives of Kirchheim unter Teck, Vol. 25). Gottlieb und Osswald, Kirchheim unter Teck, 1999. ISBN 3-925589-23-6

Articles

- Philipp Filtzinger: Limesmuseum Aalen. (Papers by theLimes Museum at Aalen, 26). Gesellschaft für Vor- u. Frühgeschichte in Württemberg und Hohenzollern e. V., Stuttgart, 1971.
- Walter A. Koch: Der Sagenkranz um Sibylle von der Teck. In: Sonderdruck aus der Teck-Rundschau Jahrgang 1951, Nos. 293, 297 und 300. Gottlieb & Oswald, Kirchheim/Teck, 1951.
- Walter A. Koch: Der Sagenkranz um Sibylle von der Teck. 4th edition, Spieth, Stuttgart, 1986. ISBN 3-88093-001-5
- Ernst Meier: Deutsche Sagen, Sitten und Gebräuche aus Schwaben. pp. 22f. Metzler, Stuttgart, 1852.
- Siegfried Müller: Altes und Neues von der Sibyllenspur. In: Blätter des Schwäbischen Albvereins, 83. pp. 180ff. Schwäbischer Albverein, Stuttgart und Tübingen, 1977.
- Dieter Planck: Ein neuer römischer Limes in Württemberg. In: Landesdenkmalamt Baden-Württemberg u.a. (ed.): Archäologische Ausgrabungen Baden-Württemberg 1982. pp. 97ff. Theiss, Stuttgart, 1983.
- Dieter Planck: Dettingen unter Teck. Lautertallimes. In: Dieter Planck (ed.): Die Römer in Baden-Württemberg. pp. 61–63 Theiss, Stuttgart, 2005. ISBN 3-8062-1555-3
- Dieter Planck: Dettingen unter Teck. Lautertallimes. In: Philipp Filtzinger, Dieter Planck, Bernhard Cämmerer (ed.): Die Römer in Baden-Württemberg. 3rd edn., pp. 268–270. Theiss, Stuttgart, 1986. ISBN 3-8062-0287-7
- Eugen Schweitzer: Beiträge zur Erforschung römischer Limitationsspuren in Südwestdeutschland. S. 24ff. Dissertation, Faculty of Architecture and Town Planning of the University of Stuttgart, Stuttgart, 1983.
- Eugen Schweitzer: Vermutungen über die Sibyllenspur in: Schwäbische Heimat. Zeitschrift des Schwäbische Heimatbundes. Jg. 29, Heft 1, p. 42. TC Druck, Stuttgart, 1978.
