= Tuffite =

Tuff containing both pyroclastic and detrital materials

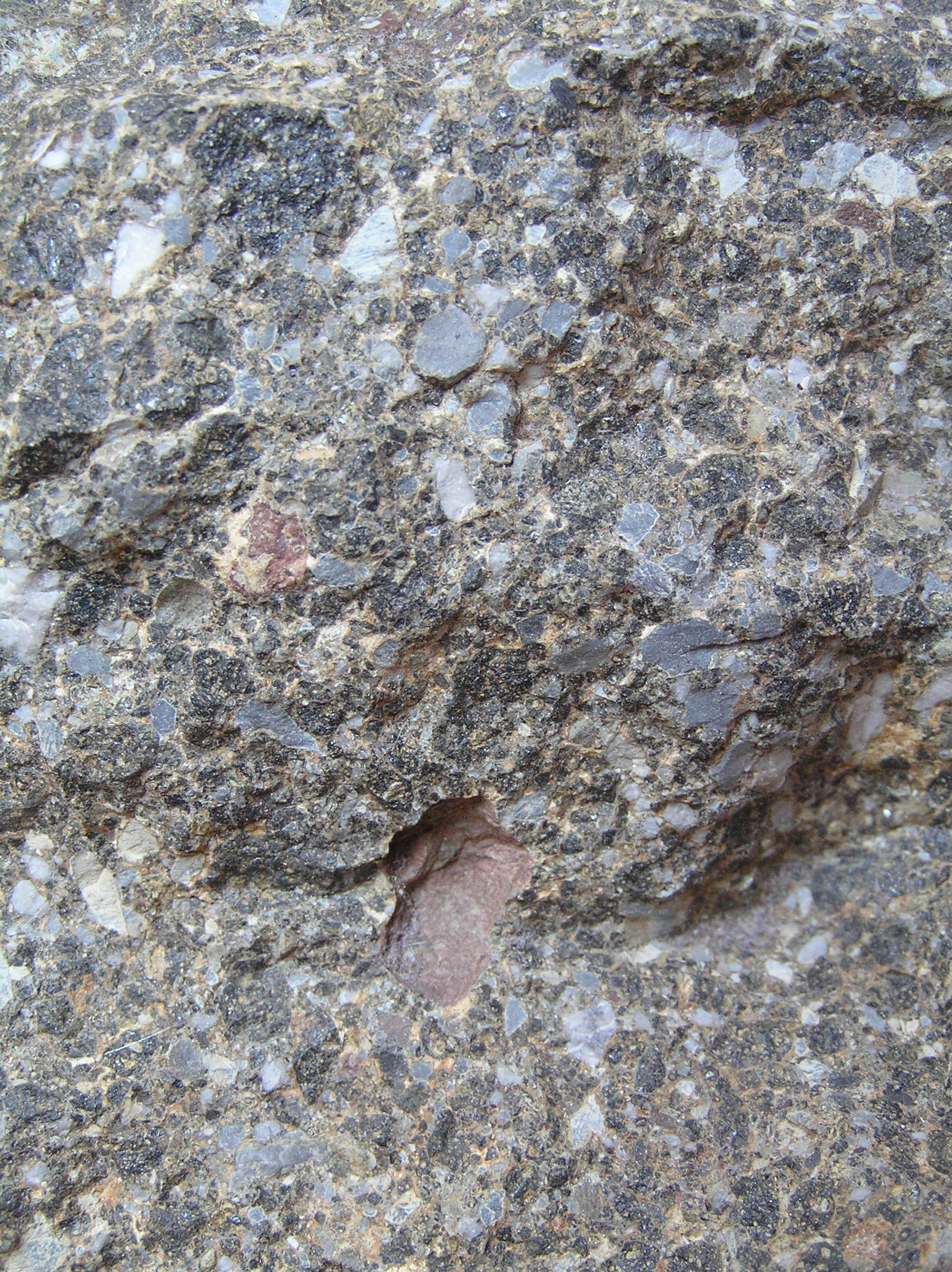
Tuffit from Hohenbol, Germany

Tuffite is a tuff containing both pyroclastic and detrital materials, but predominantly pyroclasts.

According to the IUGS definition, tuffite contains 75% to 25% volcanic (epiclastic) material.

There are several classifications that define tuffite. The classification in the IUGS recommendation is based on the definition established by Schmid (1981). Shvetsov defined tuffites as rocks containing 50% to 90% volcanic fragments. Tuffite should therefore contain more than half volcanic material. If rock contains more than 75% to 90% pyroclastic material, it is referred to as tuff. Some other, mostly older, sources state that tuffite may contain 10% to 50% volcanic material.

The adjective tuffitic is used for sediments containing less than 25% volcanic fragments.

A tuffite consists of angular and/or rounded fragments of effusive rocks and their minerals, and may also contain volcanic ash, pumice, and clay minerals. Nonvolcanic material may consist of terrigenous, chemical precipitates, or organogenic components. Quartz or mica and an admixture of carbonates, siliceous rock fragments, or organic remains may be common.
