= Black Lauter =

River in Germany

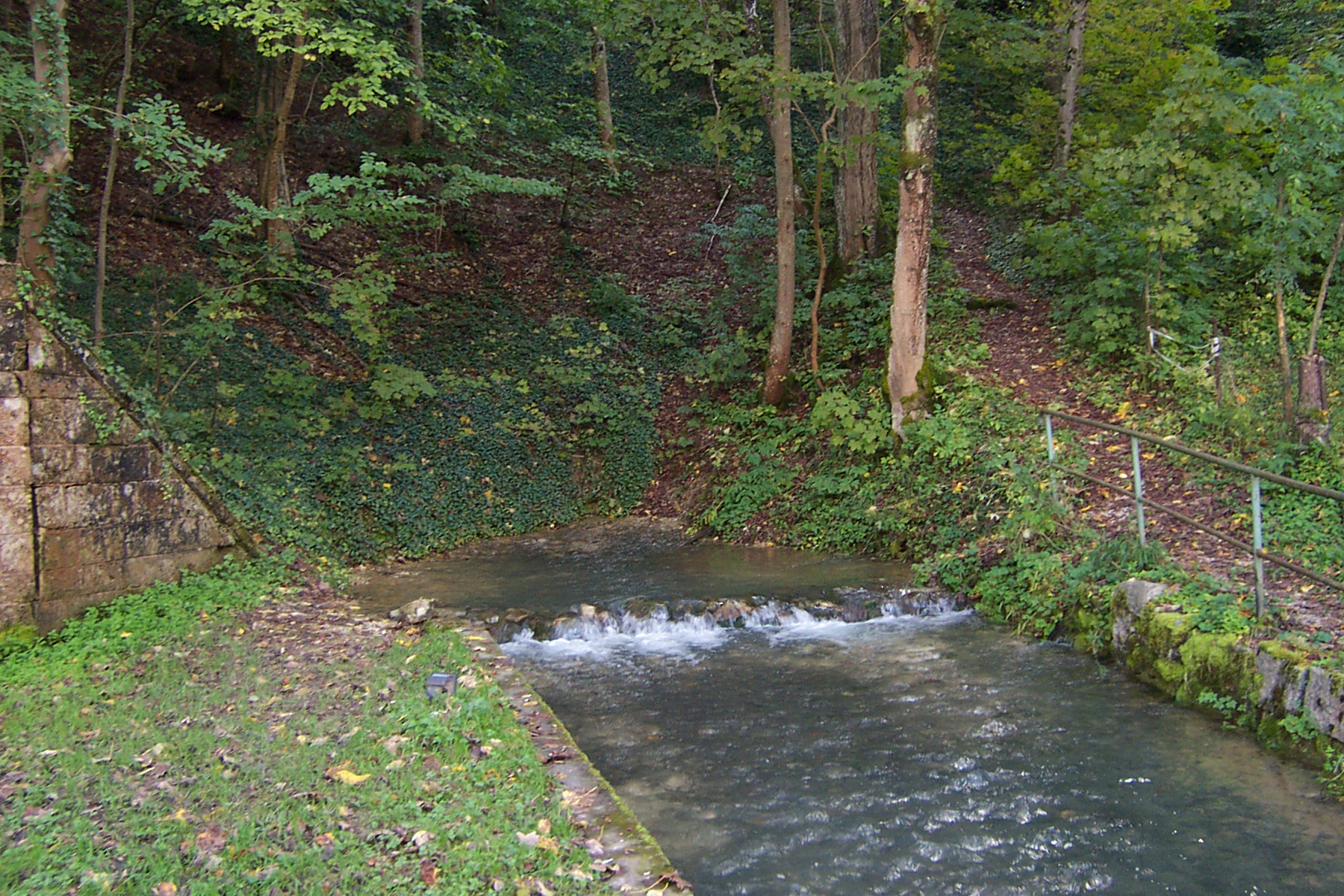
- Source of the Black Lauter in the autumn of 2002

Location
- Country: Germany
- State: Baden-Württemberg
- District: Esslingen

Physical characteristics
- Source
  - location: in Schlatstall, a part of Lenningen
  - elevation: 535 m (1,755 ft)
- Mouth
  - location: confluence with White Lauter, forming the Lauter
  - coordinates: 48°32′19″N 9°29′28″E
  - elevation: 470 m (1,540 ft)
- Length: 2 km (1.2 mi)

Basin features
- Progression: Lauter→ Neckar→ Rhine→ North Sea
- Tributaries
  - left: Seltenbach

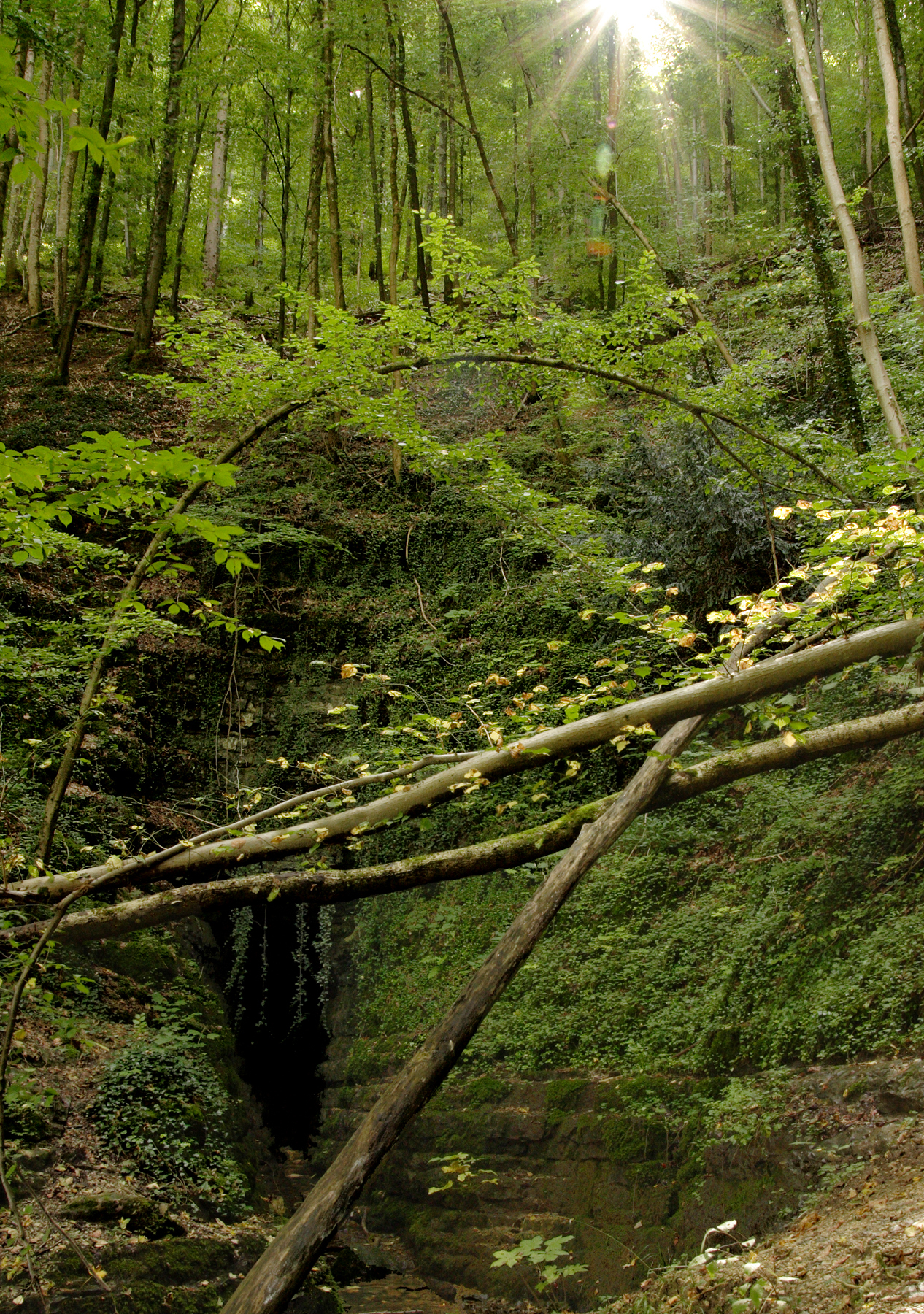
Golden hole in Schlattstall

The Black Lauter (German: Schwarze Lauter) is a river of Baden-Württemberg, Germany; the left hand source of the river Lauter. It rises in Schlatstall from the Lauterquelle well and the Golden hole. Near Lenningen it joins the White Lauter, forming the Lauter.

== Wells ==
At the mouth of the Kohlhau Valley, where it joins the Lenningen valley, lies the village of Schlatstall, which is now a part of the municipality of Lenningen. Near this village, there are a total of six karst wells. The sources, the narrow valley and the village are a popular hiking destination. The sources are part of a nature reserve. The two most important wells in terms of volume, are the Lauterquelle and the Goldloch.

=== Lauterquelle ===
The Lauterquelle, or Lauter Well, (48.52403°N 9.48971°E) is 20 metres (66 ft) ahead of the Lauter Mill, where the water-impermeable valley floor emerges. This source is so strong and rich that it could drive an overshot mill, the Lauter Mill.

=== Goldloch ===
The Goldloch, or Golden Hole, is only periodically active. This cave (48.52352°N 9.49098°E) is about 100 metres (330 ft) east of the other sources. The discharge varies between 200 and 3,000 litres per second (53 and 793 USgal/s). The mouth of the cave was extended to its present size by miners in 1824–25. No gold was found.

== Trout ==
Trout are bred in the clean, oxygen-rich karst spring water. Water from all six wells flows into fish ponds on the eastern edge of the village of Schlattstall.

== Tributaries ==
- Seltenbach, on the left side

== See also ==
- List of rivers of Baden-Württemberg
