= Lindach =

River in Germany

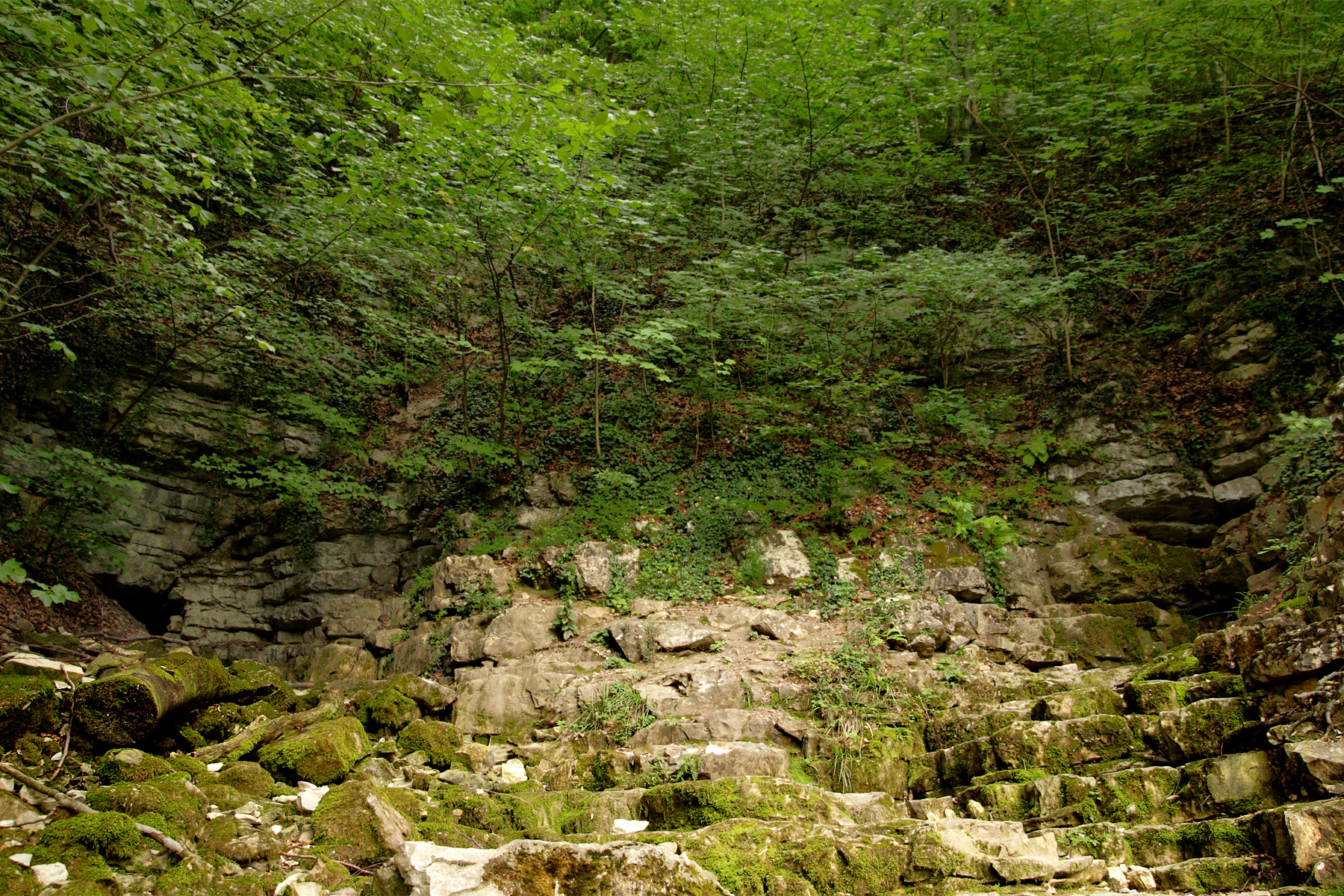
- This well is the source of the Lindach; the Karst water flows beneath the tufa overhang of the Neidlingen waterfall

Location
- Country: Germany
- State: Baden-Württemberg

Physical characteristics
- Source
  - location: below the Reussenstein Castle in the Neidlingen valley
  - coordinates: 48°33′39″N 9°33′54″E
  - elevation: 630 m (2,070 ft)
- Mouth
  - location: confluence with Lauter in Kirchheim unter Teck
  - coordinates: 48°39′11″N 9°27′7″E
  - elevation: 303 m (994 ft)
- Length: 16.7 km (10.4 mi)

Basin features
- Progression: Lauter→ Neckar→ Rhine→ North Sea

The Lindach is a small river in the central foothills of the Swabian Alb, which rises below the Reussenstein Castle in the Neidlingen valley and flows into the Lauter in Kirchheim unter Teck. It runs through the towns of Neidlingen, Weilheim an der Teck and the Jesingen district of Kirchheim unter Teck.

The source chambers are located at the top of the ridge. The karst water flows mainly from the eastern bay and after a few metres above the tuff overhang of the Neidlingen waterfall. A legend recorded by Wilhelm Hauff maintains that the source was formed when a giant tried to leap from one side of the valley to the other and slipped. The Lindach then gushed from the hole he made in the rock.

The upper Lindach valley (also known as Neidlinger valley) is a popular tourist area. The ruins of Reussenstein Castle are well-known, as is the waterfall near the source of the Lindach. In the vicinity of the river, we find the Randecker Maar crater and the Limburg mountain. A bit further afield, we find the source of the Fils river, the Teck castle and Lenningen valley. The landscape of the lower Lindach valley is less attractive, but the old town of Kirchheim is picturesque, especially the nearby town of Holzmaden with its well-known Primeval World Museum Hauff, which contains one of the most important collections of fossils in southern Germany.
