= Randecker Maar =

Volcanic crater and nature reserve in Germany

- Maar
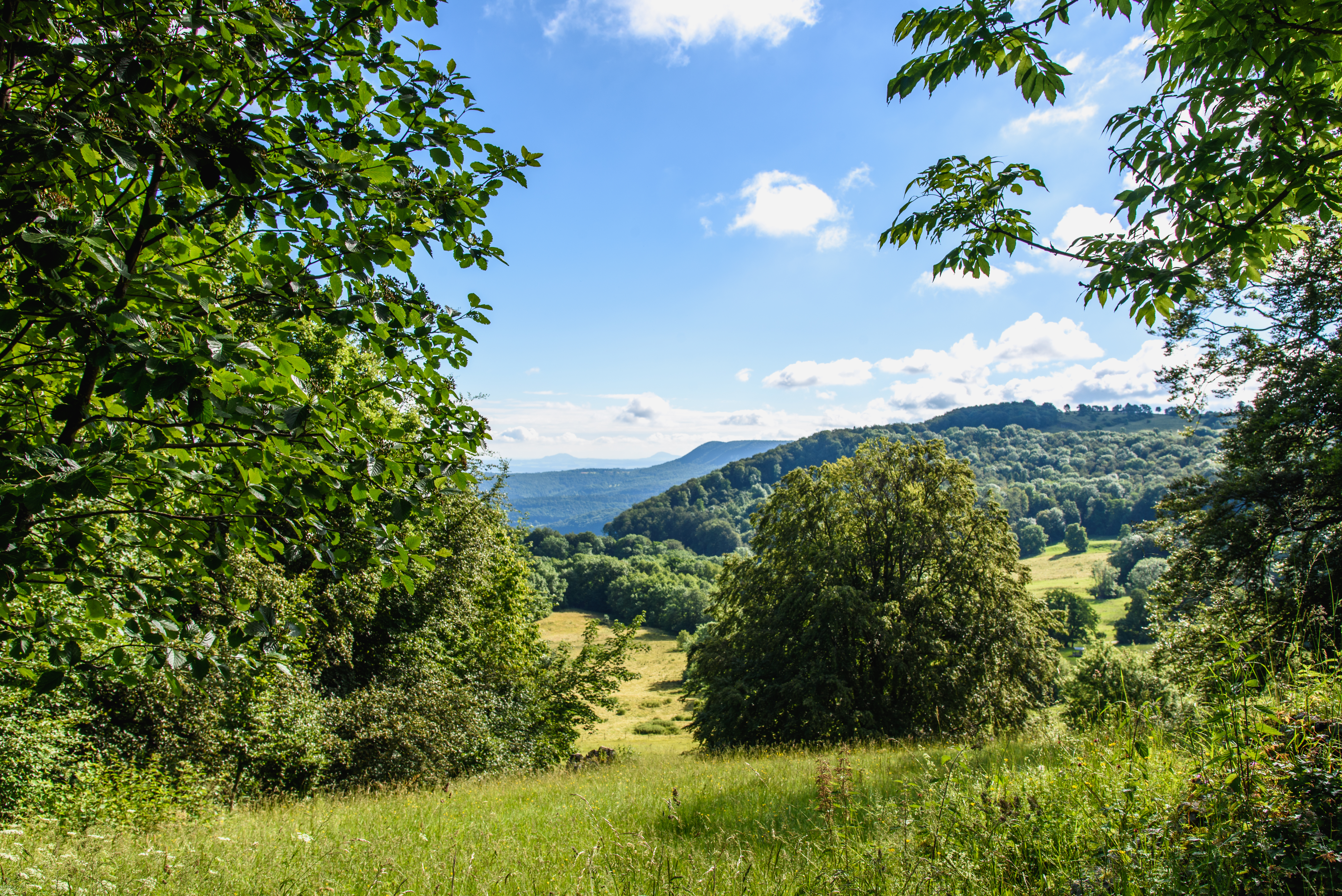

- Coordinates: 48°34′27″N 9°31′23″E
- Location: Swabian Jura
- Range: Alps
- Age: early Miocene

Dimensions
  - Width: 1.2 kilometres (0.75 mi)

The Randecker Maar is a maar – a volcanic crater about 1.2 kilometres (0.75 miles) wide. It is in the Swabian Jura mountains, in the municipality Bissingen an der Teck near Stuttgart and was formed around 17 million years ago. A lake formed in the crater and its bed is now a layer of the early Miocene in which many fossils have been found. Nowadays, the crater is drained by the Zipfelbach brook and so there is no longer a lake.

The northeastern wall of the crater has eroded and opens to lower ground. This forms a natural pass for the seasonal migration of birds and insects as they fly up and over the alps. This makes it a good point for observing these creatures and so an observatory was established there in 1969 by ornithologist Wulf Gatter – Forschungsstation Randecker Maar e.V..

The maar and gorge of the Zipfelbach were designated as a nature reserve by local ordinances in 1971 and 1990 to preserve the landscape and its fauna and flora for science and popular enjoyment. The area conserved is now 110 hectares (0.42 square miles).

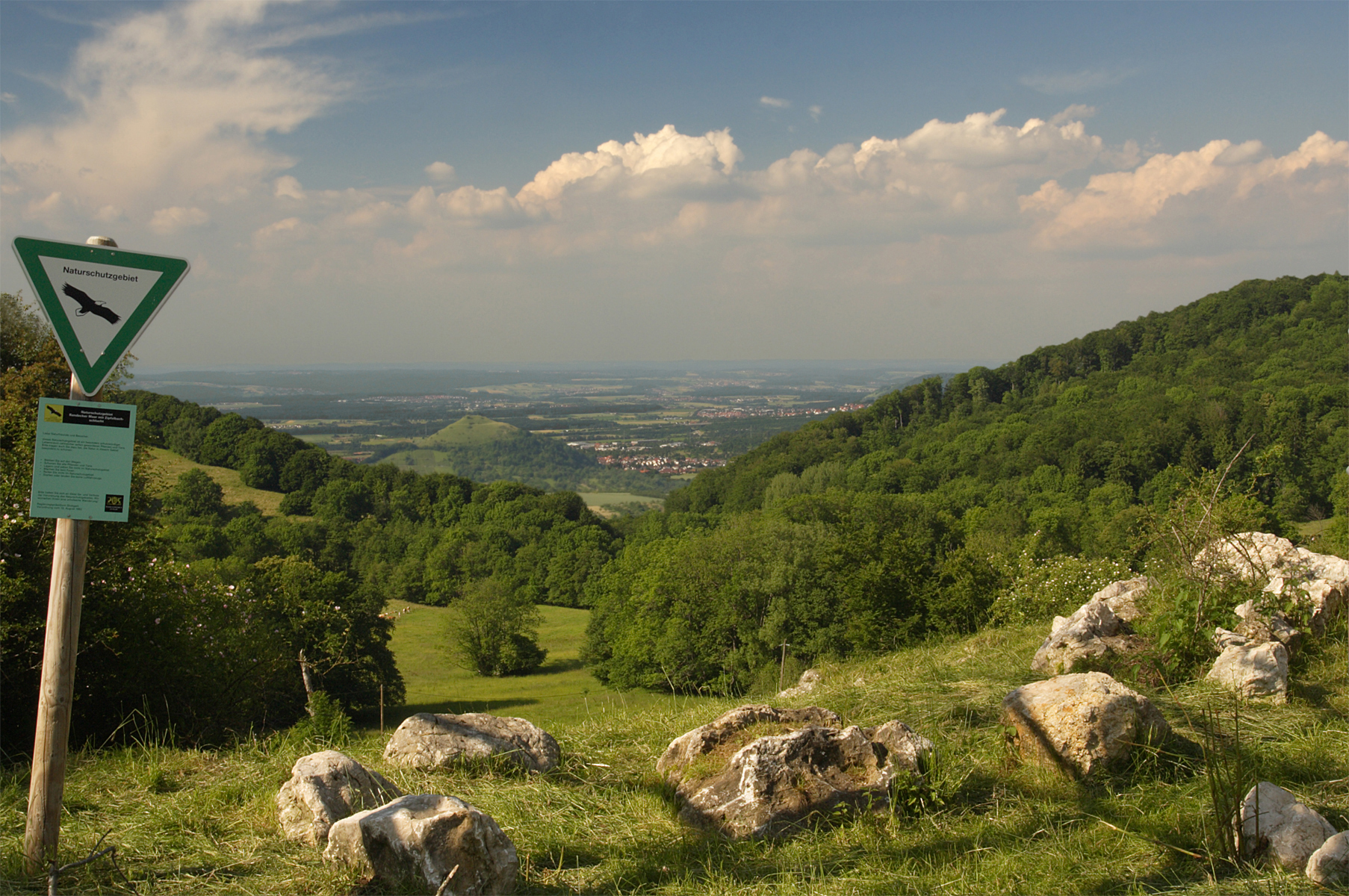
A view to the NNE showing the pass and the Limburg beyond

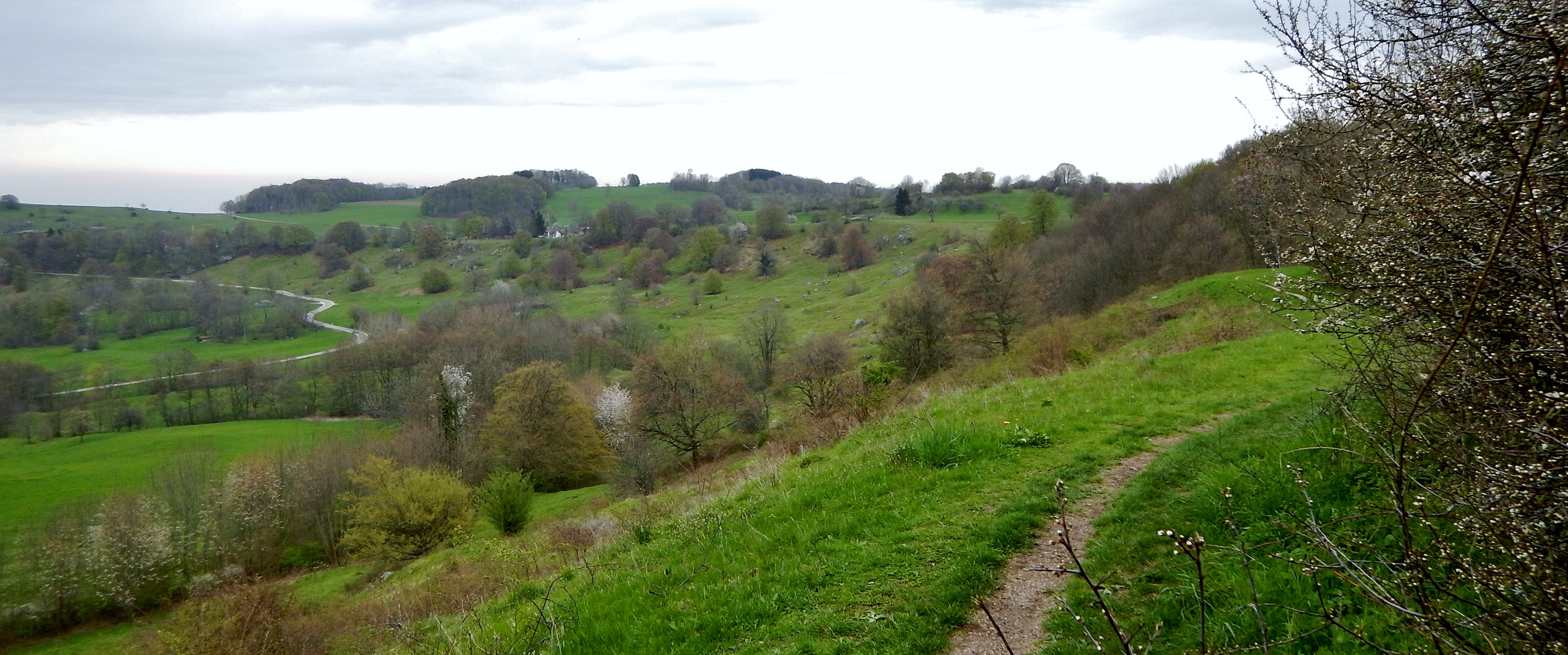
