= White Lauter =

River in Germany

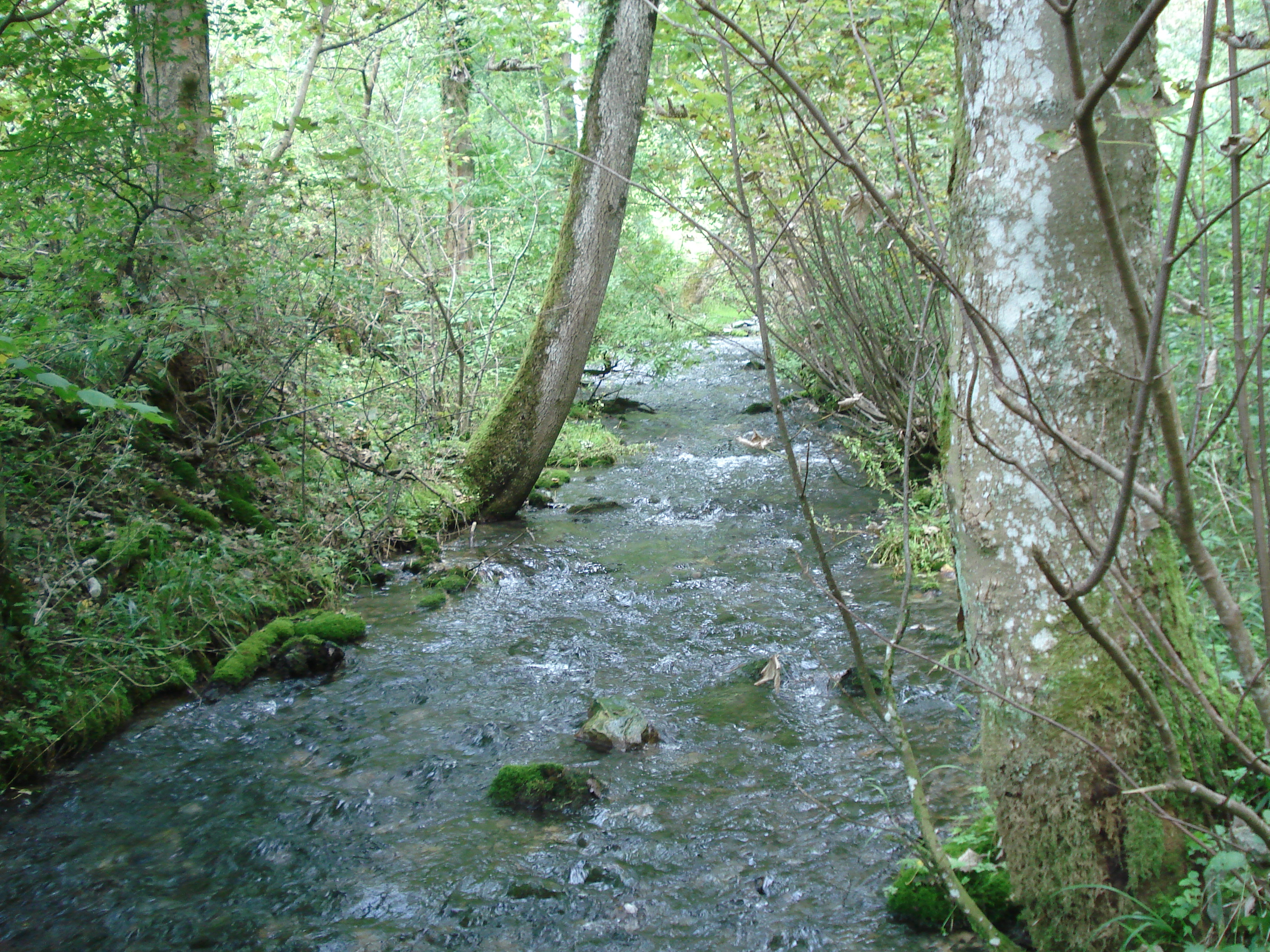
- White Lauter below the source

Location
- Country: Germany
- State: Baden-Württemberg
- District: Esslingen

Physical characteristics
- Source
  - location: well southeast of Lenningen
  - coordinates: 48°31′57″N 9°31′42″E
  - elevation: 570 m (1,870 ft)
- Mouth
  - location: Confluence with Black Lauter, forming the Lauter
  - coordinates: 48°32′7″N 9°29′45″E
- Length: 3.5 km (2.2 mi)

Basin features
- Progression: Lauter→ Neckar→ Rhine→ North Sea

The White Lauter (German: Weiße Lauter) is the right hand source of the river Lauter. It rises southeast of Lenningen below the state road B465. Near Lenningen it joins the Black Lauter, forming the Lauter.

== Source of the White Lauter ==
The source of the White Lauter is located southeast of Gutenberg in Lenningen, below the B465 and is designated as a nature reserve. It consists of several rows of wells on the valley floor, which appear a few metres apart, as Karst wells. Some of the sources are used for the supply of drinking water. The average discharge is about 300 litres per second. The catchment area is part of the adjacent Schwabian Alps plateau, but the exact extent is unknown.

== Course ==
The White Lauter flows west through Gutenberg. It the end of the village. it receives the creek of the Donn valley and bends to the north. At the treatment plant it joins the Black Lauter, forming the Lauter.

== Gallery ==
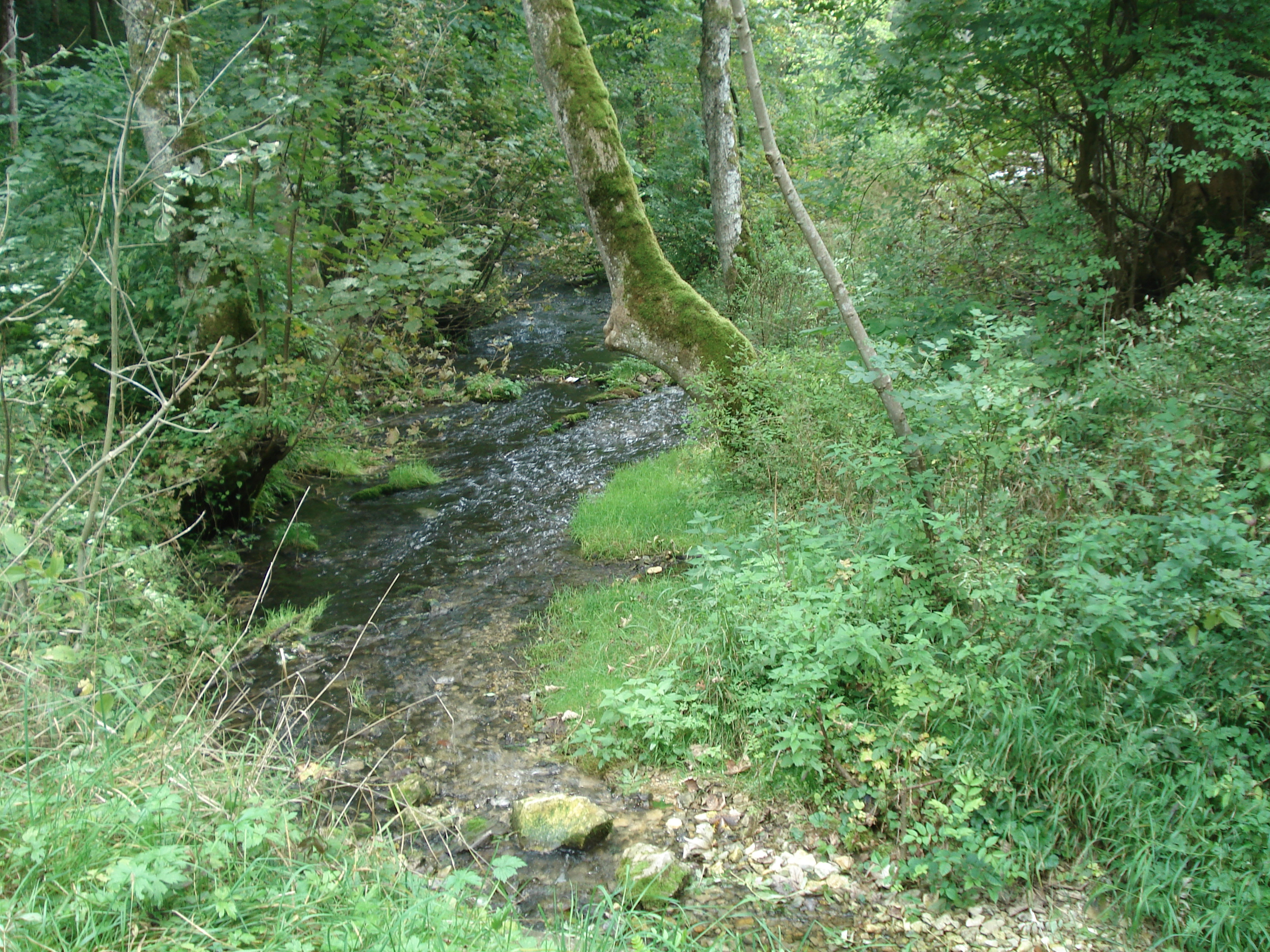
Source of the Lauter

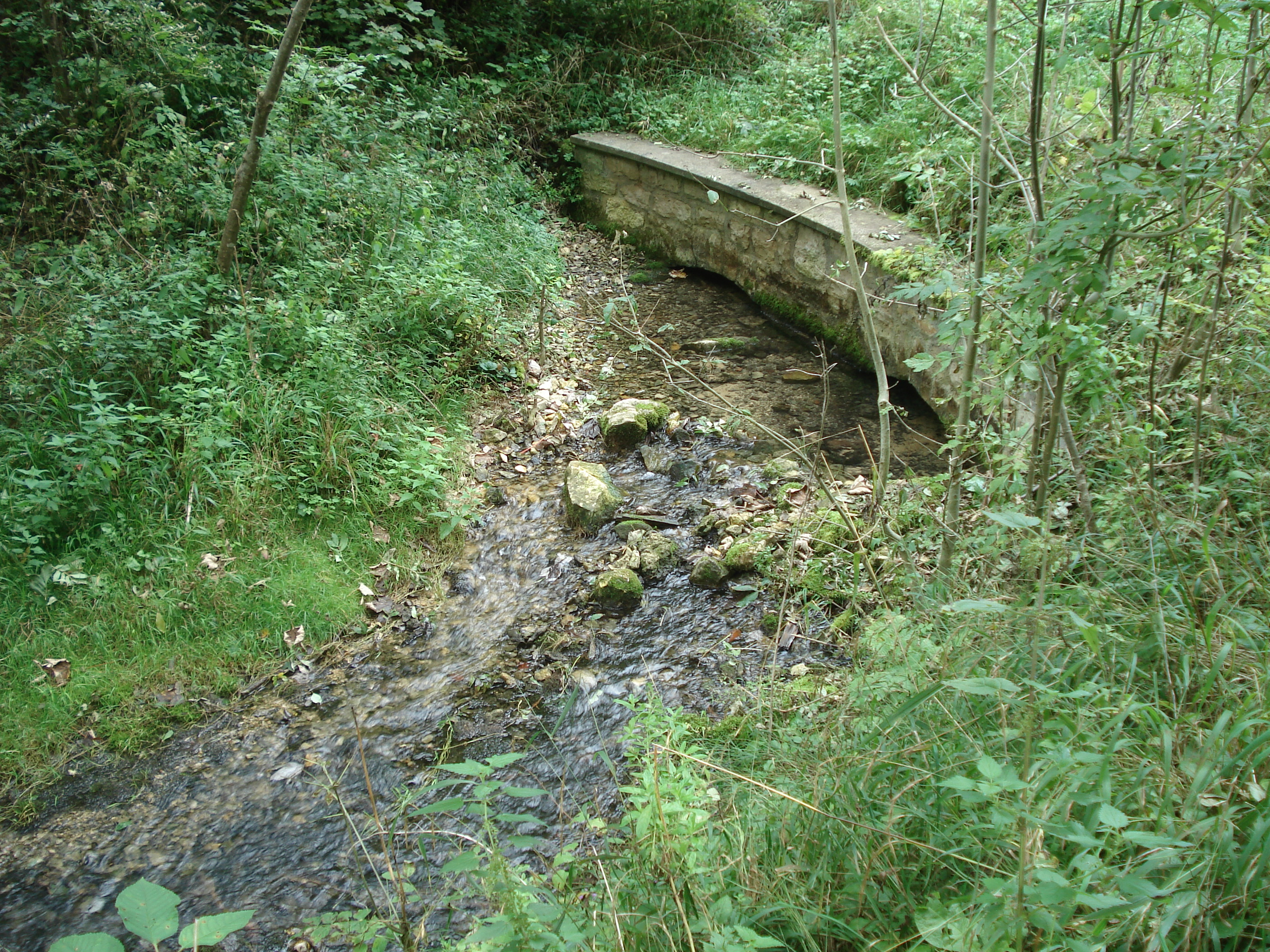
The main source
