= Randecker Maar Research Station =

Animal research station

Coordinates: 48°56′N 9°52′E

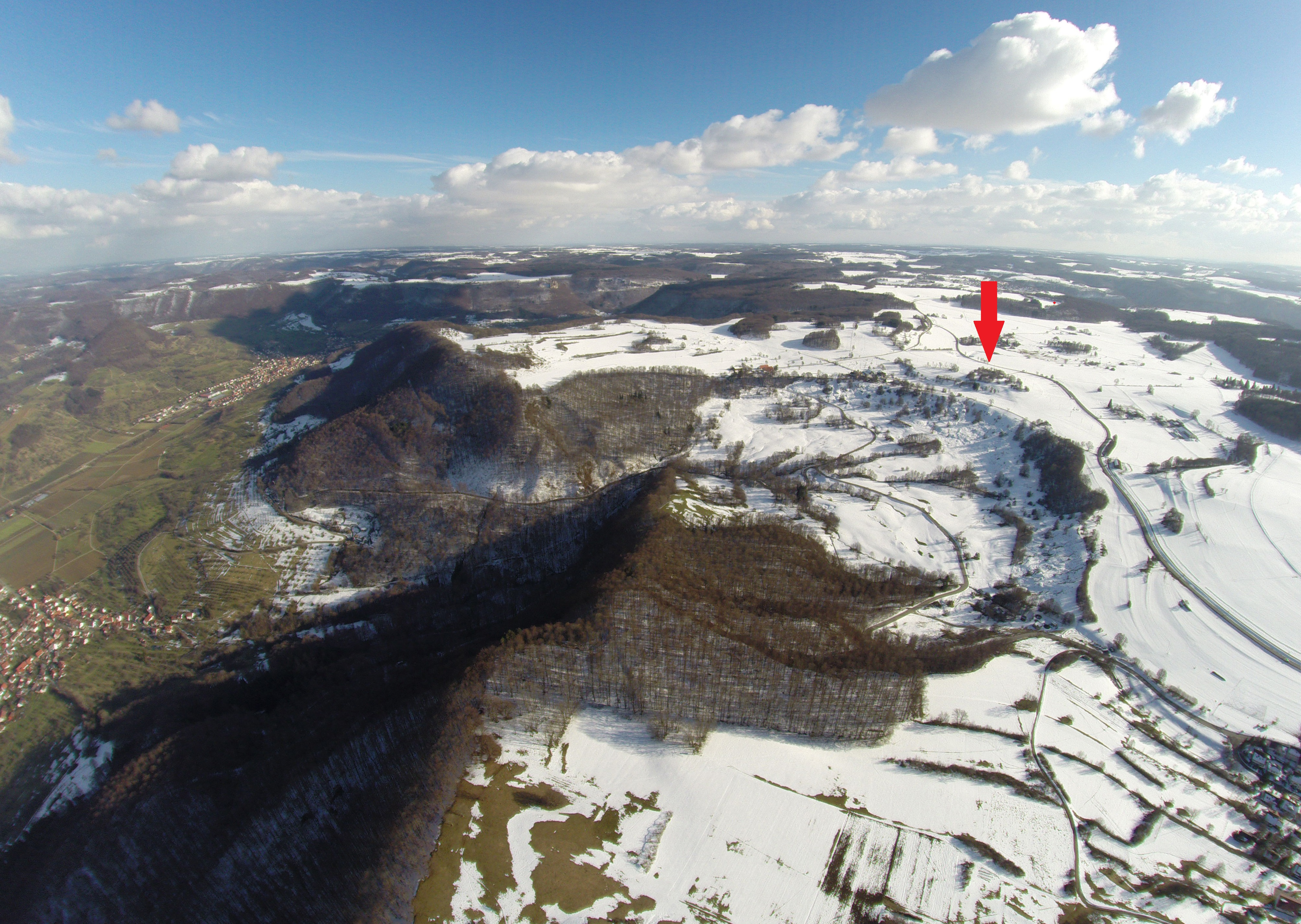
The crater of the Randecker Maar volcano, cut open by erosion on its northern side. Through this gap in the Swabian Jura mountains, birds and insects migrate south. The arrow indicates the location of the Randecker Maar Research Observatory for Bird and Insect Migration.

The Randecker Maar Research Station (German: Forschungsstation Randecker Maar e.V.) is a bird observatory which was founded in 1969 by the ornithologist Wulf Gatter. It studies birds, insects and other migratory creatures which tend to concentrate in the pass through the crater of the Randecker Maar as they fly over the Swabian Jura.

The research station is located at an elevation of 773 meters above sea level on the northern precipice of the Swabian Jura of Baden-Württemberg in southern Germany. Insects and birds cross this mountain range on their southward autumn migration in great numbers. At the site of an extinct volcano, the Randecker Maar, migration of insects and birds is concentrated both horizontally and vertically. This funnel effect is due to the erosion that has cut open the volcanic crater on its northern edge. Both insects and birds prefer this gap to cross the elevated ground.

== History ==
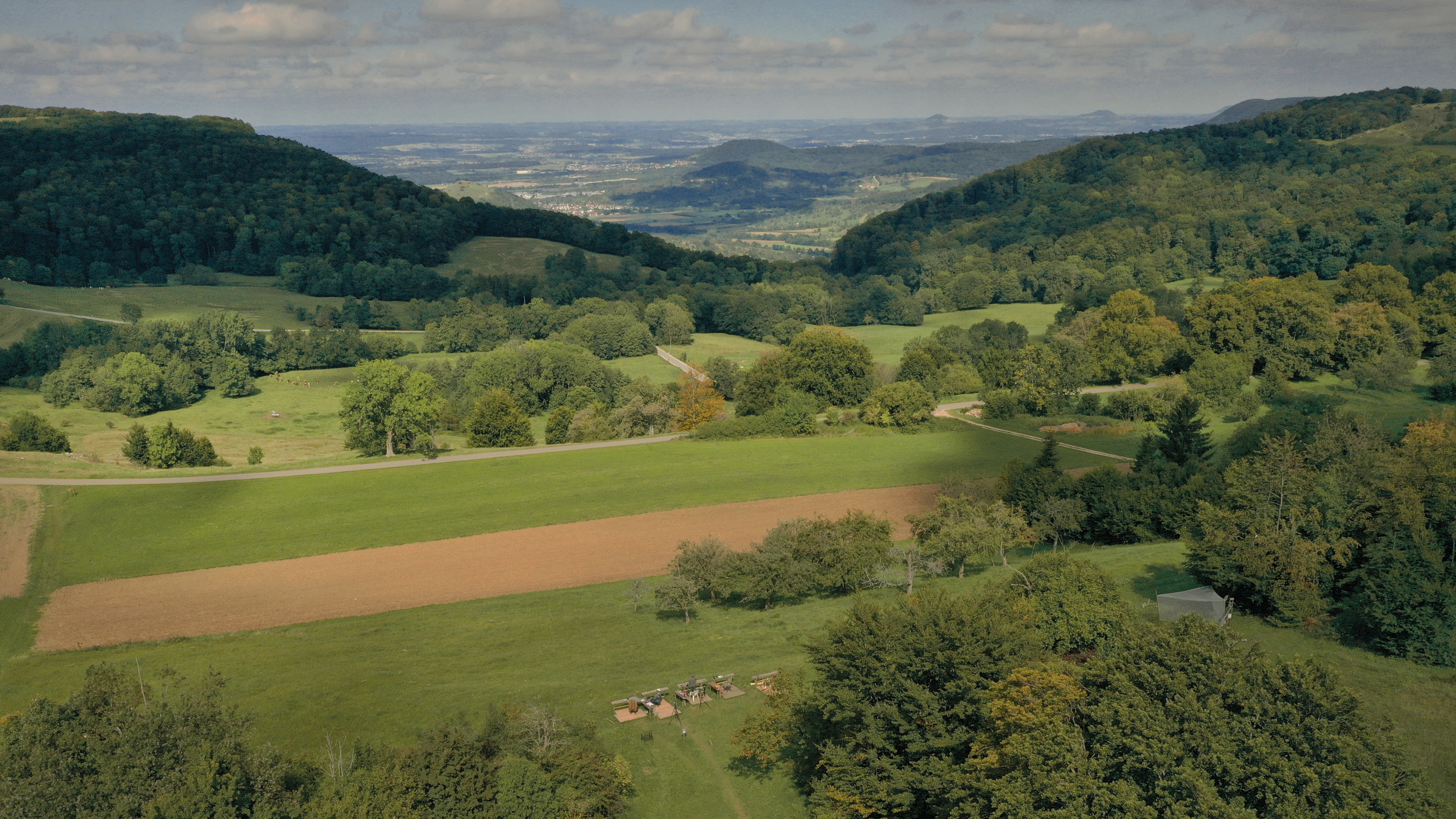
Bird watchers on the hilltop of the Randecker Maar Observatory overlooking the volcano with its northern gap, used by birds and insects used when crossing the Swabian Jura mountains on their southward migration. On the lower right the insect funnel trap is visible.

The Randecker Maar has been a site for animal migrations since at least the Neolithic. In the crater of the volcano and along the creek flowing out of it, remnants of camps of hunters and gatherers were found, who are believed to have hunted migrating animals here.

== Research ==
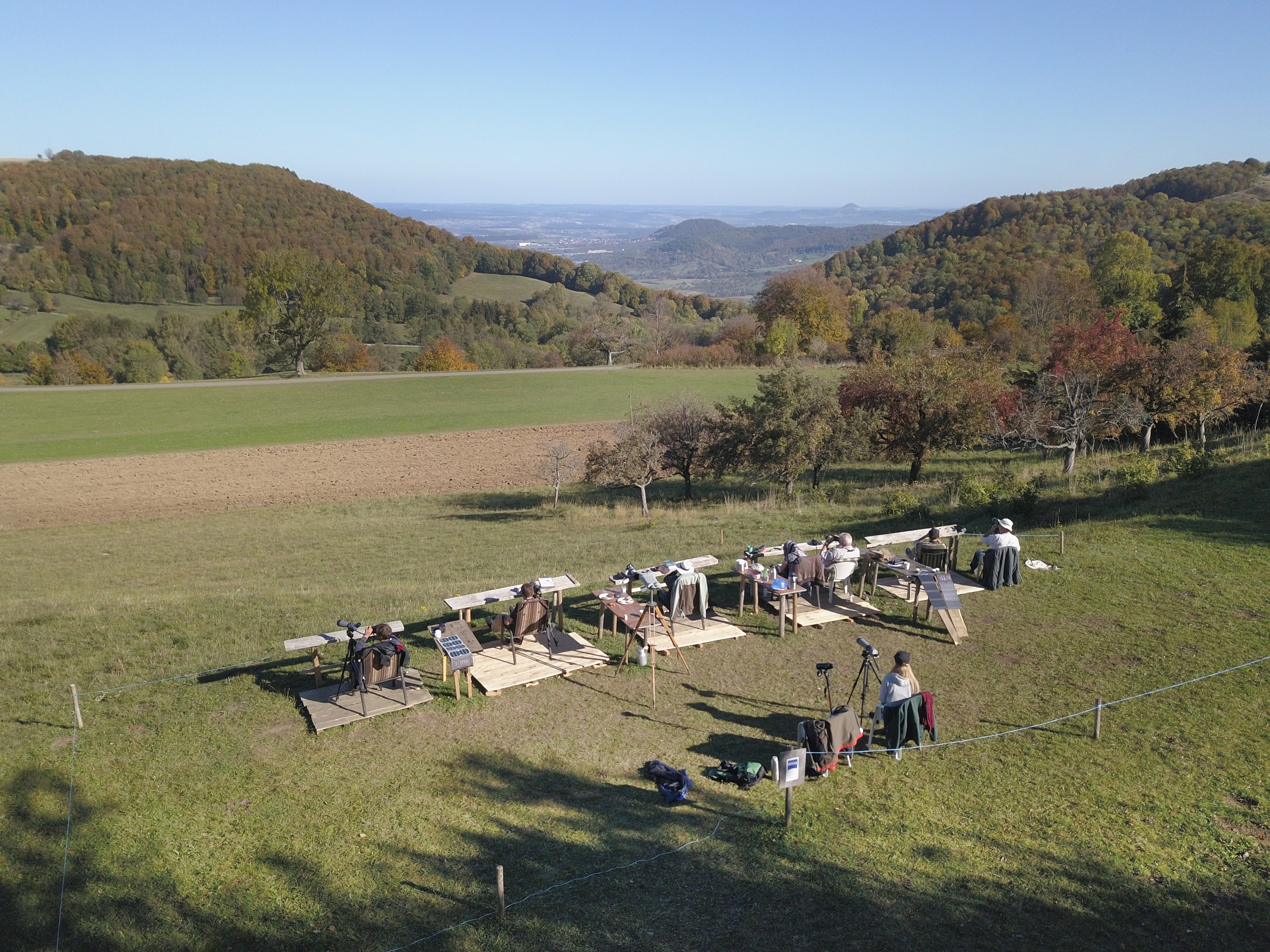
Bird watchers at the Randecker Maar Observatory look towards the north at migrating birds and insects.

The observatory conducts research on bird migration routes and migration strategies of birds between Europe and West Africa at the Randecker Maar, related management of agricultural lands and forests in Europe, and as the changes in the habitat in the African wintering areas of European migrant birds.

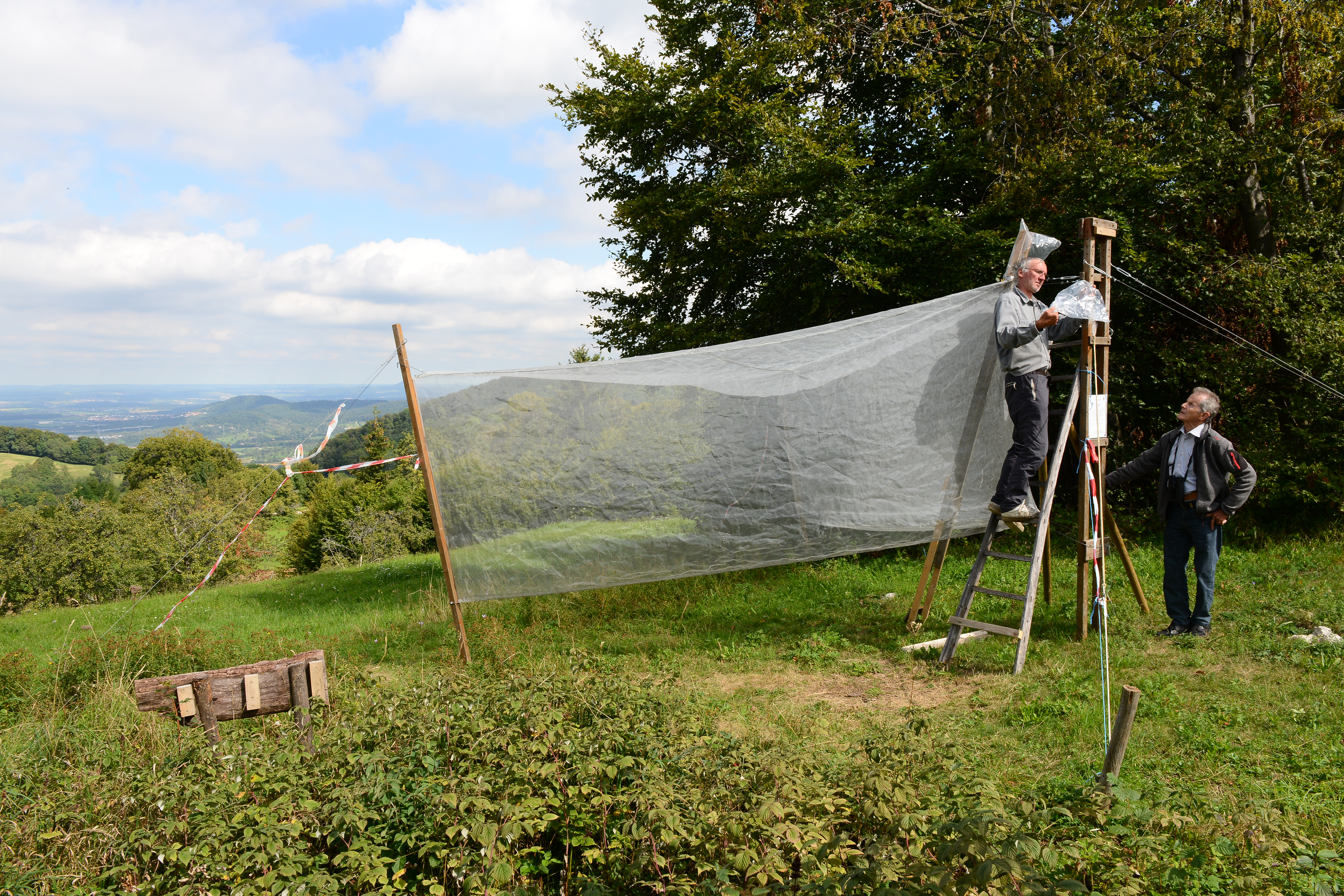
Funnel trap for insects on their southern migration across the Swabian Jura mountains at the Randecker Maar Observatory, 2019

Besides birds, flying insects also cross the Swabian Jura mountain range on their southward autumn migrations. At the Randecker Maar Observatory data are collected on migrating moths and on moths in nearby protected zones.

In 2020, data on insect migration at the Randecker Maar showed a decrease in migration at the location for insect groups such as hoverflies (Syrphidae), parasitic Ichneumon wasps (Ichneumonidae), and soldier-flies (Stratiomyidae) in 2015-2019 compared to data in 1985-1987 and 1978–1982.For hoverflies with aphidophagous larval development and migrating in July to August had steeper declines since the 1970s than hoverflies that migrate later in the year with a mainly aquatic saprophagic larval development.
