= Neidlingen =

German municipality

- Municipality
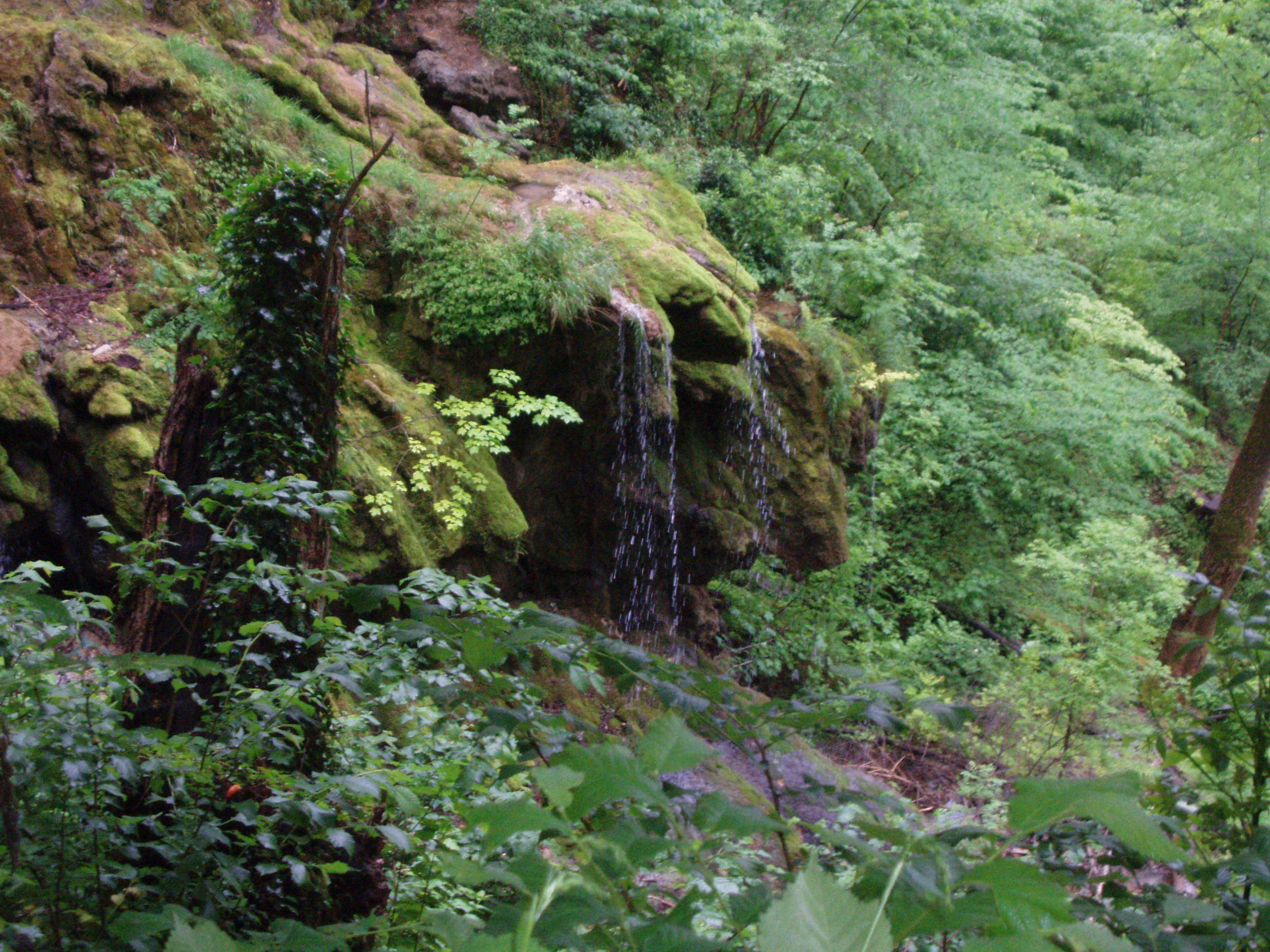
- The Lindach near Neidlingen

- Coat of arms

- Location of Neidlingen within Esslingen district
- Interactive map of Neidlingen
- Location within Germany Location within Baden-Württemberg
- Coordinates: 48°34′45″N 9°33′54″E
- Country: Germany
- State: Baden-Württemberg
- Admin. region: Stuttgart
- District: Esslingen

Government
  - Mayor (2021–29): Jürgen Ebler

Area
  - Total: 12.63 km^{2} (4.88 sq mi)
- Elevation: 456 m (1,496 ft)

Population (2025-12-31)
  - Total: 1,692
  - Density: 134.0/km^{2} (347.0/sq mi)
- Time zone: UTC+01:00 (CET)
  - Summer (DST): UTC+02:00 (CEST)
- Postal codes: 73272
- Dialling codes: 07023
- Vehicle registration: ES
- Website: www.neidlingen.de

Neidlingen (German pronunciation: [ˈnaɪdlɪŋən]; Swabian: Neidlenge) is a municipality in the district of Esslingen, in Baden-Württemberg, Germany.

== History ==
In 1807, Neidlingen, formerly a possession of the Kingdom of Bavaria, was assigned to the district of Wiesensteig in the Kingdom of Württemberg. The town was reassigned in 1810 to Oberamt Kirchheim.

=== Nazi Germany and World War II ===
The Nazi Party was a political non-entity in Neidlingen until the federal elections of 1930, but only secured local plurality in the 1932 state election. A local Nazi Party affiliate was formed that year under Wilhelm Aysslinger, the party district manager. In the March 1933 German federal election, the Nazis received 80.6% of the vote in Nedilingen, and that May three Nazis were elected to the six-member municipal council. Oberamt Kirchheim was dissolved in 1938 and Neidlingen was assigned to Landkreis Nürtingen.

29 forced laborers from Poland, Russia, and Ukraine arrived at Neidlingen in 1941 to work on local farms. The US Army occupied the town on 21 April 1945 after a short fight with units of the German Army and German-aligned Russian Liberation Army.

=== After World War II ===
Neidlingen experienced a period of industrial growth in the 1950s. In 1973, following that year's reform of the districts of Baden-Württemberg, the town was assigned to the district of Esslingen.

== Geography ==
The municipality (Gemeinde) of Neidlingen covers 12.60 square kilometers (4.86 sq mi) of the Esslingen district of Baden-Württemberg, a state of the Federal Republic of Germany. It is located 26 kilometers (16 mi) from the district capital, Esslingen am Neckar, on the district's south-east tip and along the border with the district of Göppingen. Inside Esslingen's district, Neidlingen shares a border with Weilheim an der Teck, Bissingen an der Teck and Lenningen. The municipality is physically located along the northern edge of the central foothills of the Swabian Jura, and stretches form the heights of the upper valley of the Lindach to the albtrauf of the Fils. 46% of the municipal area is covered in forest. Another 45% is used for agriculture, primarily for orchards. Its boundaries generally decided by the lay of the albtrauf, which sits atop the Brown and White Jurassic formations.

Neidlingen itself is sits upon the confluence of the Lindach and the Seebach, above the Eisensandstein Formation. The Lindach and its valley begins to the southwest of the town in a plateau of the Jura that averages an elevation above sea level of 760 meters (2,490 ft) Normalnull (NN). The highest elevation in the municipality, 800 meters (2,600 ft) NN, is found here in the Drittelwald. The Lindach valley continues through Neidlingen to the northwest, widening until being narrowed by the Erkenberg and the Burz. Upon these limestone bluffs are juniper groves and sheep pastures that have been placed under Federal protection as the Unter dem Burz and Erkenbergwasen nature reserves. Beyond this, the Lindach continues and marks the lowest elevation above sea level in the municipal area, 423 meters (1,388 ft) NN. The slopes of the valley are formed by the Opalinuston Formation. Near the Erkenberg and the Burz are springs that turn the edges of the Linbach's basin into marshland that have been named a protected body of water and was connected to the Baden-Württemberg State Water Supply in 2002.

Neidlingen is east of the Randecker Maar (a former volcanic vent) and is part of the Swabian Alps Biosphere Reserve.

== Demographics ==
Population development:

| Year | Inhabitants |
|---|---|
| 1990 | 1.722 |
| 2001 | 1.916 |
| 2011 | 1.800 |
| 2021 | 1.799 |

== Politics ==
Neidlingen has one borough (Ortsteil), Neidlingen. There are five abandoned villages in its municipal area: Heimenstein, Lichtenstein, Merkenberg, Reußenstein, and Windeck.

Klaus Däschler has been mayor of Neidlingen since 2014. In 2021 Jürgen Ebler was elected mayor.

=== Coat of arms ===
Neidlingen's municipal coat of arms has its field divided party per fess into an upper, white section containing a green oak branch and a lower, green section with a large, white "N". This pattern dates to 1669, though the "N" first appeared in an earlier coat of arms from 1616. The oak branch was, from 1930 to 1953, replaced with a tree flanked by two saplings. The tincture was decided in 1953, and on 15 June 1953, the coat of arms was approved for official use by the provisional Württemberg-Baden government. The Federal Ministry of the Interior reapproved the coat of arms on 16 August 1973.

== Transportation ==
The L1200 runs through the center of Neidlingen.
