= Teckberg =

Mountain in Germany

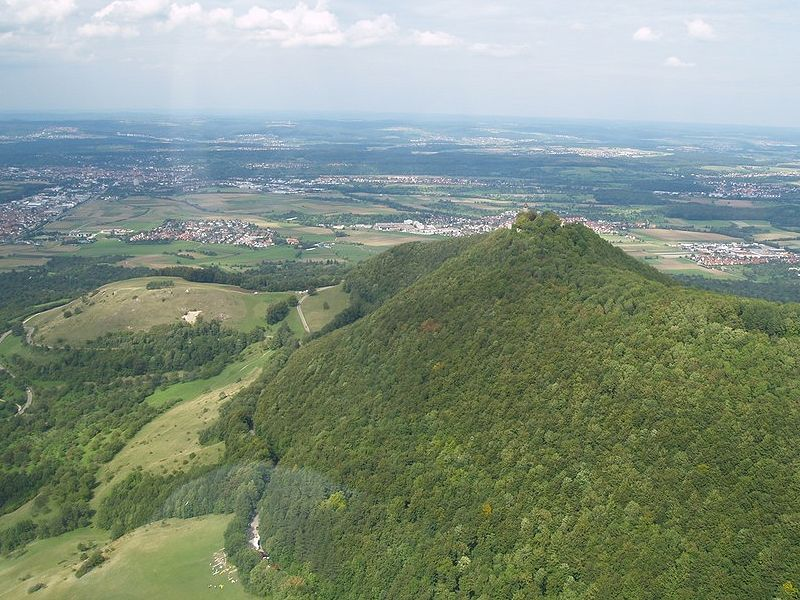
- A view of Teckberg mountain

Highest point
- Elevation: 775 m (2,543 ft)
- Coordinates: 48°35′19″N 9°28′13″E

Geography
- Location within Baden-Württemberg
- Location: Baden-Württemberg, Germany

Teckberg (German pronunciation: [ˈtɛkbɛʁk]; also Teck) is a mountain located in Landkreis Esslingen, Baden-Württemberg, Germany. It stands at an elevation of 775 m above sea level (NHN) (2,543 ft) and is crowned by the castle Teck.

== Geography ==
Teckberg protrudes approximately 3 km (1.9 mi) northward from the edge of the Swabian Jura, towering over the Albvorland by 350 m (1,150 ft) and overlooking the Lauter (Neckar) valley by 400 m (1,300 ft). Flanked by the mid-high 602 metres (1,975 ft) foothills Hörnle and Hohenbol to the north and northwest, both of which encompass chimneys of the Swabian volcano, it serves as a notable landmark. To the north beneath the Hörnle lies the glider area Teck, situated between Dettingen unter Teck and Bissingen an der Teck.

The mountain's slope is characterized by the Yellow Rock, a bright limestone sponge reef from the Jura Sea. Positioned under the "Gelber Fels" are the 602 m long (1,975 ft) and 45-metre high (148 ft) Veronikahöhle and Verena-Beutlins-Loch, interconnected by columns. Eastward of the Gelber Fels, three grave mounds from the Hallstatt period (800-400 BC) signify early human settlement of Teckberg. Under the castle Teck is the 35 m long (115 ft) and 9 m high (30 ft) high-fabled Sibyllenloch, on the other side the 22 m long (72 ft) Sibyllenhöhle. The Sibyllenhöhle was discovered inadvertently during construction work in 1937 and was further explored in 1977, revealing its geological and perhaps historical significance. During excavations in the Sibyllenloch in 1898/99, over 2,000 skeletal remains of various species such as cave bear, cave lion, cave hyena, and wild horse were found, enabling researchers to derive critical insights into the glacial fauna that once inhabited the region.

== Nature reserve ==
The entire Teckberg, spanning 386.0 hectares (954 acres), was designated as a nature reserve by the Regierungspräsidium Stuttgart on November 9, 1999. The intention behind this designation was to safeguard and foster a diversely rich cultural landscape that includes wet and dry meadows, orchards, hedges, forest edges, alleys, groves, solitary trees, rocks, caves, springs, and rare natural forest communities. These environments provide quality habitats for a myriad of plant and animal species, some of which are endangered. Within this multifaceted natural area, botanists have identified 464 different plant species.

== Literature ==
(in German)

- Wolfgang Roser, Jürgen Mauch: Der Schwäbische Vulkan. GO Druck-Media-Verlag, Kirchheim unter Teck 2003, ISBN 3-925589-29-5.
- Konrad Theiss: Der Kreis Esslingen. Theiss, Stuttgart 1978, ISBN 3-8062-0171-4.
- Naturschutzgebiet Teck, hrsg. von der Landesanstalt für Umweltschutz Baden-Württemberg (LfU). Verlag Regionalkultur, Ubstadt-Weiher 2000. ISBN 978-3-89735-142-4.
- Reinhard Wolf, Ulrike Kreh (Hrsg.): Die Naturschutzgebiete im Regierungsbezirk Stuttgart. Thorbecke, Ostfildern 2007, ISBN 978-3-7995-5176-2, S. 492–495
