= Hohenbol =

Coordinates: 48°36′N 9°28′E

Highest point
- Elevation: 602 m (1,975 ft)

Geography
- Location: Baden-Württemberg, Germany

The Hohenbol (German pronunciation: [ˈhoːənˌboːl]) is a mountain of Baden-Württemberg, Germany.

- Hohenbol (Baden-Württemberg)
- Type Witnesses Mountain of volcanic origin

The Hohenbol is a 602.1 m above sea level (NHN) high mountain 2 kilometers from the town of Owen in the district of Esslingen in Baden-Württemberg.

The Hohenbol is a foothill of the Teckberg and upstrimes this northwest. The Teckberg and the summit of Hohenbol (above the orchard slope) are a nature reserve protected area.

The Hohenbol is a witness mountain of volcanic origin. He is one of the 355 volcanoes that are known from the "Urach volcanic area".

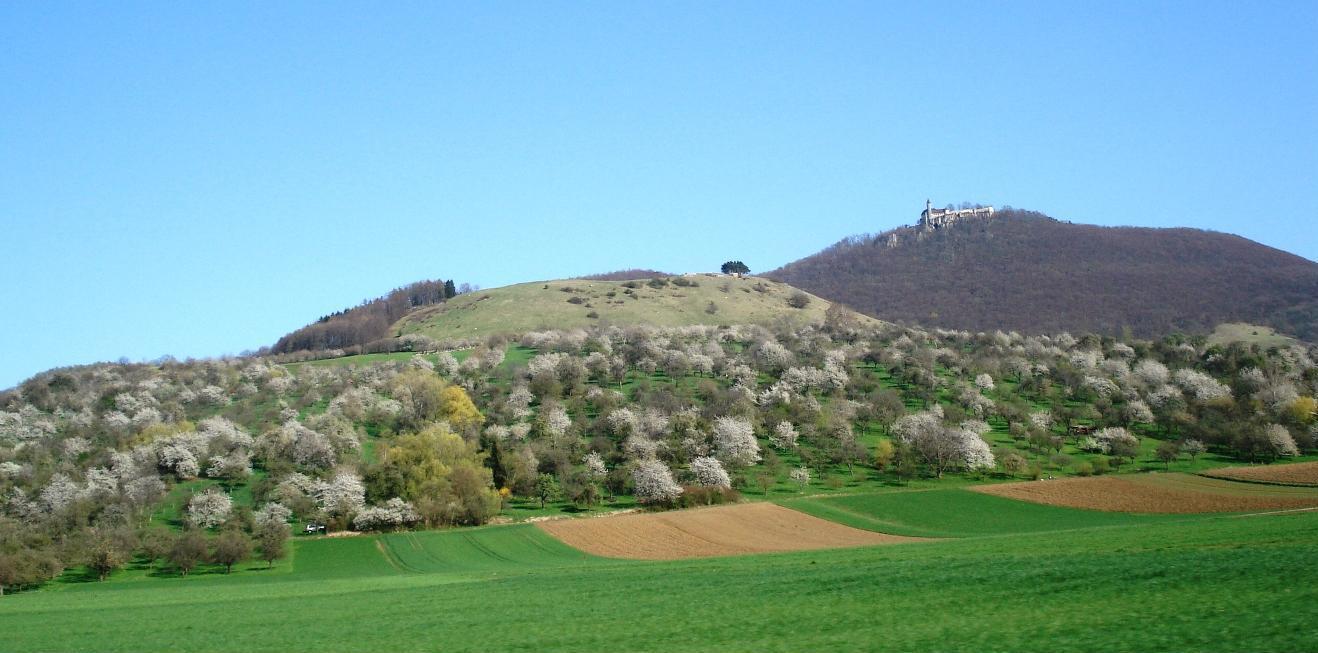
Hohenbol (left) and Teckberg (right)

== Geology ==
It is originated in the Miocene, when one of the volcanic vents of the Swabian volcano forced its way through the surrounding rock. Through erosion of Hohenbol was (especially in the west and north) exposed the softer surrounding material.

== Other ==
With a distinctive group of black pines on its summit, the Hohenbol is clearly visible. The area of the Hohenbol belongs to the nature reserve Teck.

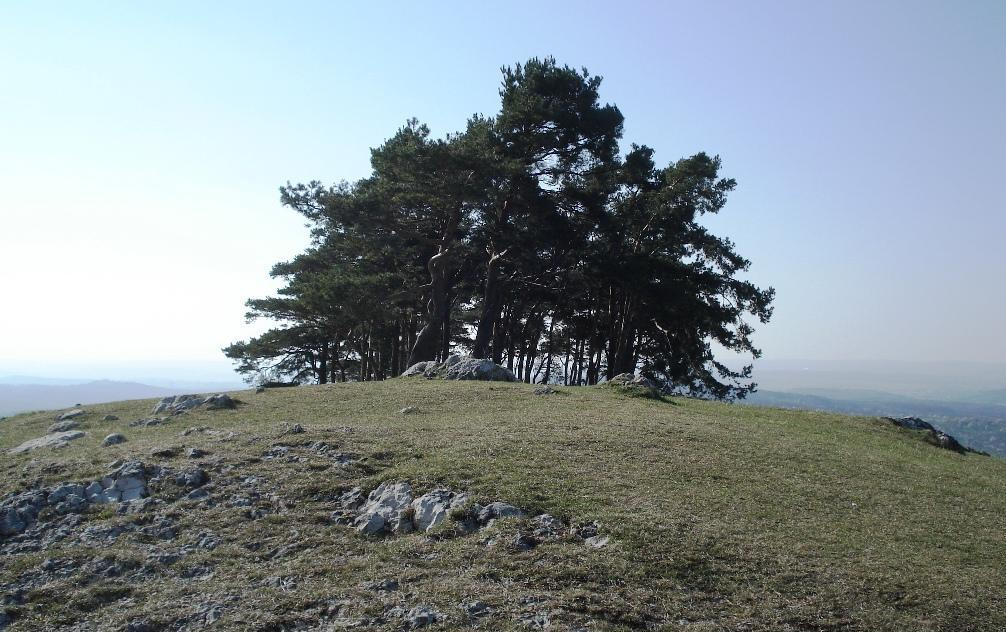
Hohenbol Summit
