= Dettingen unter Teck =

- Municipality
- Coat of arms

- Location of Dettingen unter Teck within Esslingen district
- Interactive map of Dettingen unter Teck
- Location within Germany Location within Baden-Württemberg
- Coordinates: 48°36′58″N 9°27′6″E
- Country: Germany
- State: Baden-Württemberg
- Admin. region: Stuttgart
- District: Esslingen

Government
  - Mayor (2020–28): Rainer Haußmann

Area
  - Total: 15.13 km^{2} (5.84 sq mi)
- Elevation: 352 m (1,155 ft)

Population (2025-12-31)
  - Total: 6,150
  - Density: 406/km^{2} (1,050/sq mi)
- Time zone: UTC+01:00 (CET)
  - Summer (DST): UTC+02:00 (CEST)
- Postal codes: 73265
- Dialling codes: 07021
- Vehicle registration: ES
- Website: www.dettingen-teck.de

Dettingen unter Teck (German pronunciation: [ˈdɛtɪŋən ʔʊntɐ ˈtɛk], lit. 'Dettingen under Teck') is a municipality in the district of Esslingen in Baden-Württemberg in southern Germany.

== Geography ==
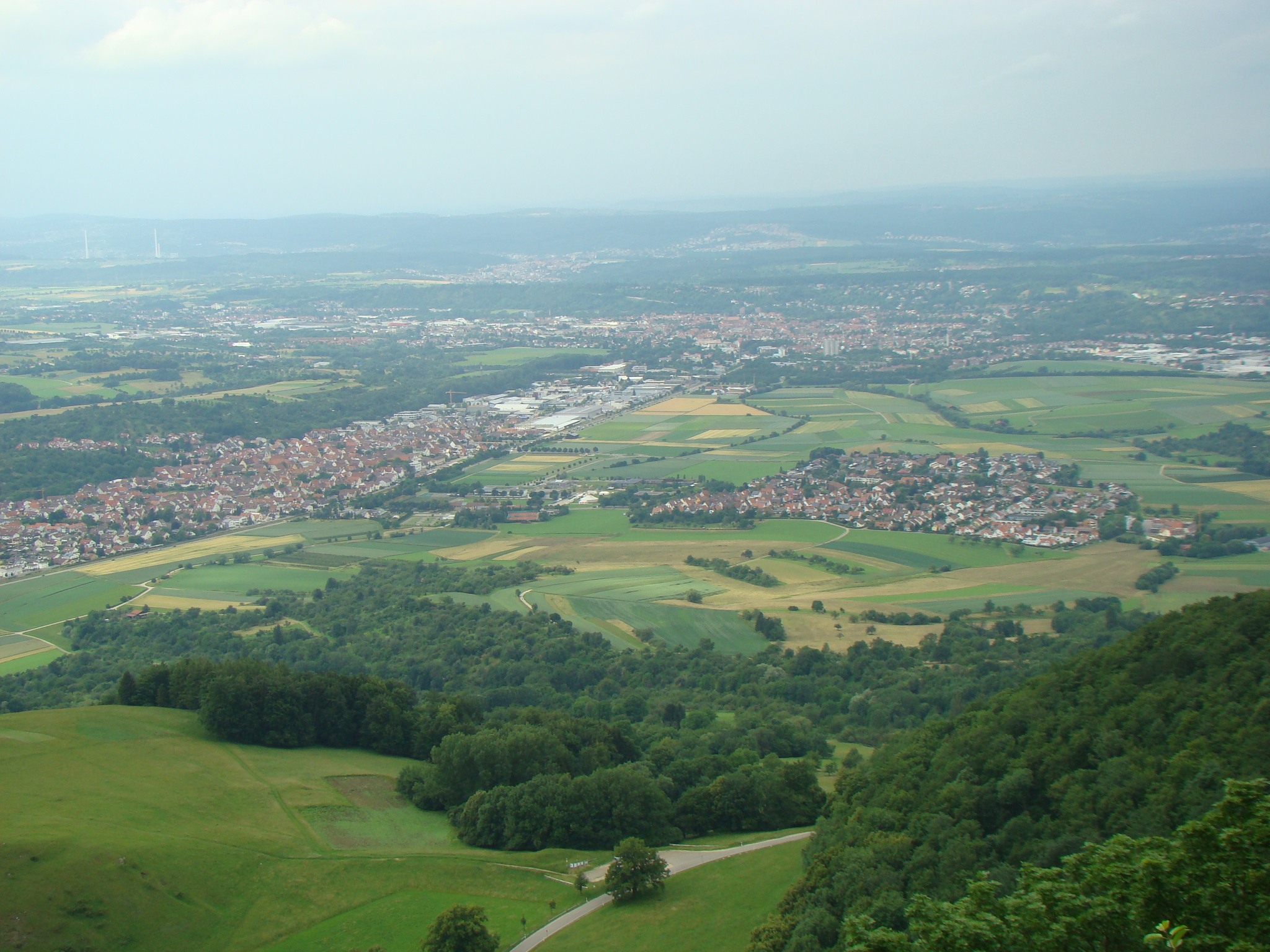
View from the Teckberg of Dettingen and Kirchheim

Dettingen is located 40 km southeast of Stuttgart and 4 km south of Kirchheim unter Teck at an elevation of between 329 and 520 metres. 463 hectares (c. 30%) of the municipal area is forested.

The village lies at the foot of the Teckberg (775 m), hence the second part of its name.

== History ==
Dettingen 1683/1685 in Kieserschen forest stock book The Lauter valley show evidence of settlement from ancient times. The Lautertal Limes, a Roman border fortification known colloquially as the Sybillenspur, runs through the middle of the valley and the village. South of today's village lies the Roman fort of Dettingen unter Teck.

Dettingen was first mentioned around 1100. Unusually, there is a high number of castles and noble family seats on its territory - no less than six. None of the castles has survived; they were all demolished in the early Middle Ages. The resident noble families had the majority of manorial rights on the Dettingen estates. Suzerainty over Dettingen was exercised by the House of Württemberg from as early as 1381; in 1415 brought the Württembergs gave rights to the local lords.

Dettingen's vintners were active during the German Peasants' War of 1525. During the Thirty Years' War the village was badly damaged, its population was reduced by war and plague to around one third. In the early 17th century, the village had around 1300 inhabitants, in 1654 there were just 511. The settlement was slow to recover; the Napoleonic Wars of the 19th century dealing it another setback. In 1715, 160 farmsteads were uninhabited and 300 acres of fields and vineyards lay fallow. In 1803, Dettingen had about 1800 inhabitants. In 1939, the Schempp-Hirth aerodrome was commandeered by the Luftwaffe as a military airfield. It was relatively small, however, and therefore not used by the air force. At the end of the Second World War, Dettingen was hit hard, 20 April 1945 was its fateful day. Days before German troops had sought and found refuge in Dettingen during their retreat to the Swabian Jura. The barns and cellars were full of German soldiers when, around 4 pm, Allied fighter-bombers began a systematic bombardment of the village. Explosive and incendiary bombs were dropped, quickly burning down 69 houses and setting 39 barns ablaze. The church, the town hall, the Schlössle, the old school, the kindergarten and fire station were destroyed by fire, the cattle burned in their cowsheds. Ten local residents and 13 soldiers died. One day later, the Americans invaded and occupied the village.

Until 1938, Dettingen belonged to Oberamt Kirchheim, then to the county of Nürtingen and from 1973 to the county of Esslingen.

== Demographics ==
The number of inhabitants are estimates, census results (¹) or official extrapolations of statistica office Stuttgart. Year Population

- 1654: ca. 511
- 1700: ca. 1.000
- 3 December 1834: ¹ 2.192
- 1 December 1871: ¹ 1.907
- 1 December 1900: ¹ 2.048
- 17 May 1939: ¹ 2.366
- 13 September 1950: ¹ 3.131
- 6 June 1961: ¹ 3.616
- 27 May 1970: ¹ 4.047
- 25 May 1987: ¹ 5.055
- 31 December 1995: 5.355
- 31 December 2000: 5.438
- 31 December 2005: 5.642
- 31 December 2010: 5.698

== Local council ==
The local council in Dettingen has 14 members. Communal elections in Baden-Württemberg 25 May 2014 had the following official results. The local council are the elected voluntary members and the mayor as president. The mayor has one vote.

Political parties and community voters		% 2014	Seats 2014	% 2009	Seats 2009
CDU/FWV	Christian Democratic Union of Germany/Free voters	32,90	4	30,20	4
FWG	Free voters Baden-Württemberg	28,58	4	42,60	6
SPD	Social Democratic Party of Germany	19,35	3	27,20	4
DBL	Dettinger citizen list	19,17	3	0,0	0
Total		100,0	14	100,0	14
Poll		51.98 %		57.50 %	

== Mayors ==
- 1932–1945: Wilhelm Faßnacht
- 1945–1948: Gottlieb Lauxmann
- 1948–1957: Julius Mahle
- 1957–1972: Richard Käser
- 1972–1996: Günter Fischer
- Since 1996: Rainer Haußmann

On 4 March 2012, Rainer Haußmann was re-elected for a third period.

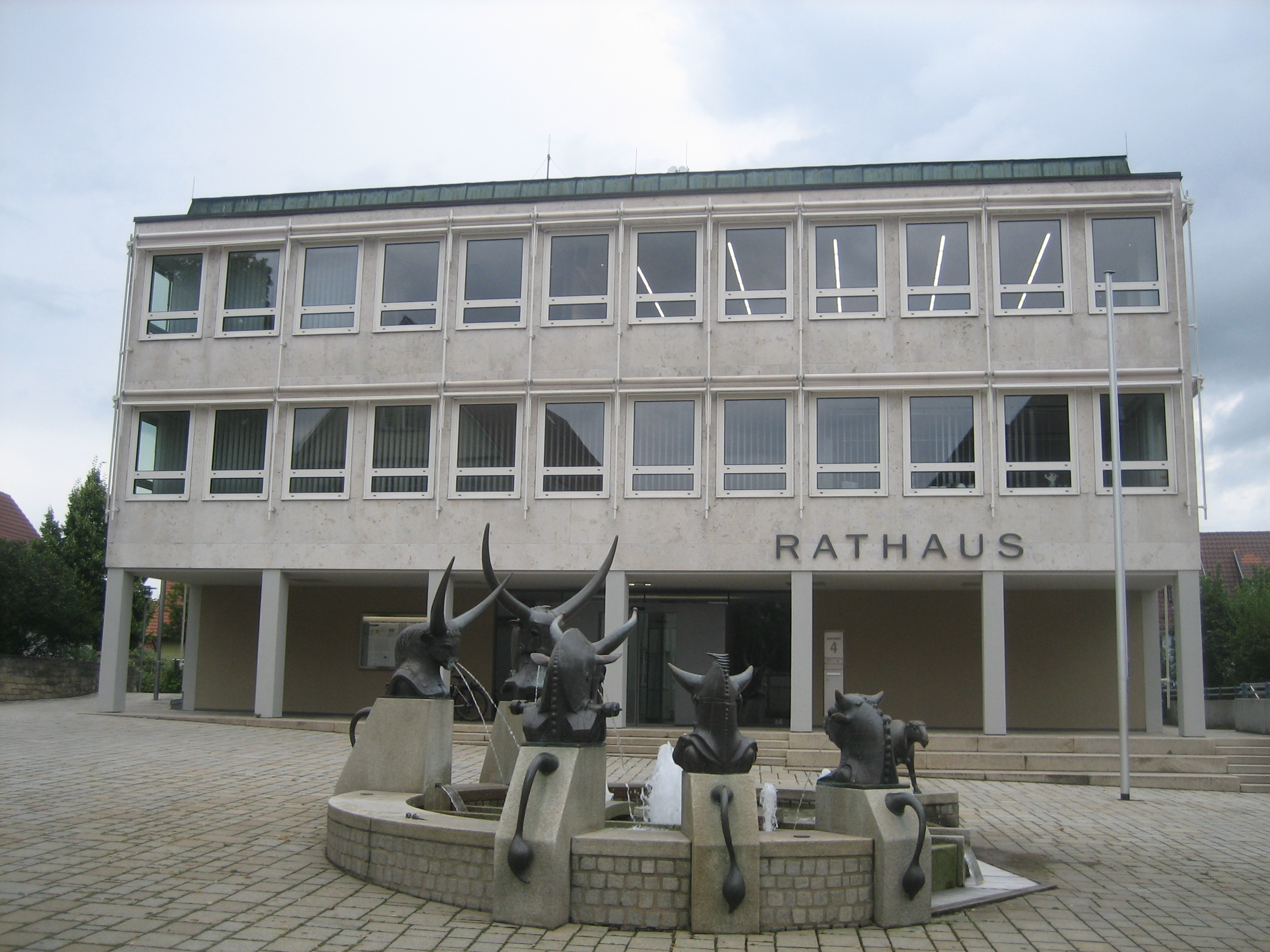
Dettingen unter Teck Districts Esslingen Town hall with town hall fountain

== Traffic ==
The Teck Railway runs since 1899 from Wendlingen, Kirchheim, Dettingen, Owen to Oberlenningen (about 20 kilometers). The Royal Württemberg State Railways built the - now restored and used elsewhere - station building as a unit station type IIa. The station can be found in 1:87 as a model on many model railroads, including name, incidentally, also at the largest model railway in the world in miniature wonderland in Hamburg. [6] 2009, Teck Railway was electrified to Kirchheim and has since been on the S-Bahn Stuttgart traveled, the more distance over Dettingen after Oberlenningen is per direction per hour from a regional train operates. Dettingen belongs to the district of Esslingen the Transport and Tariff Association Stuttgart and is the Tarifwabe Kirchheim / Teck.

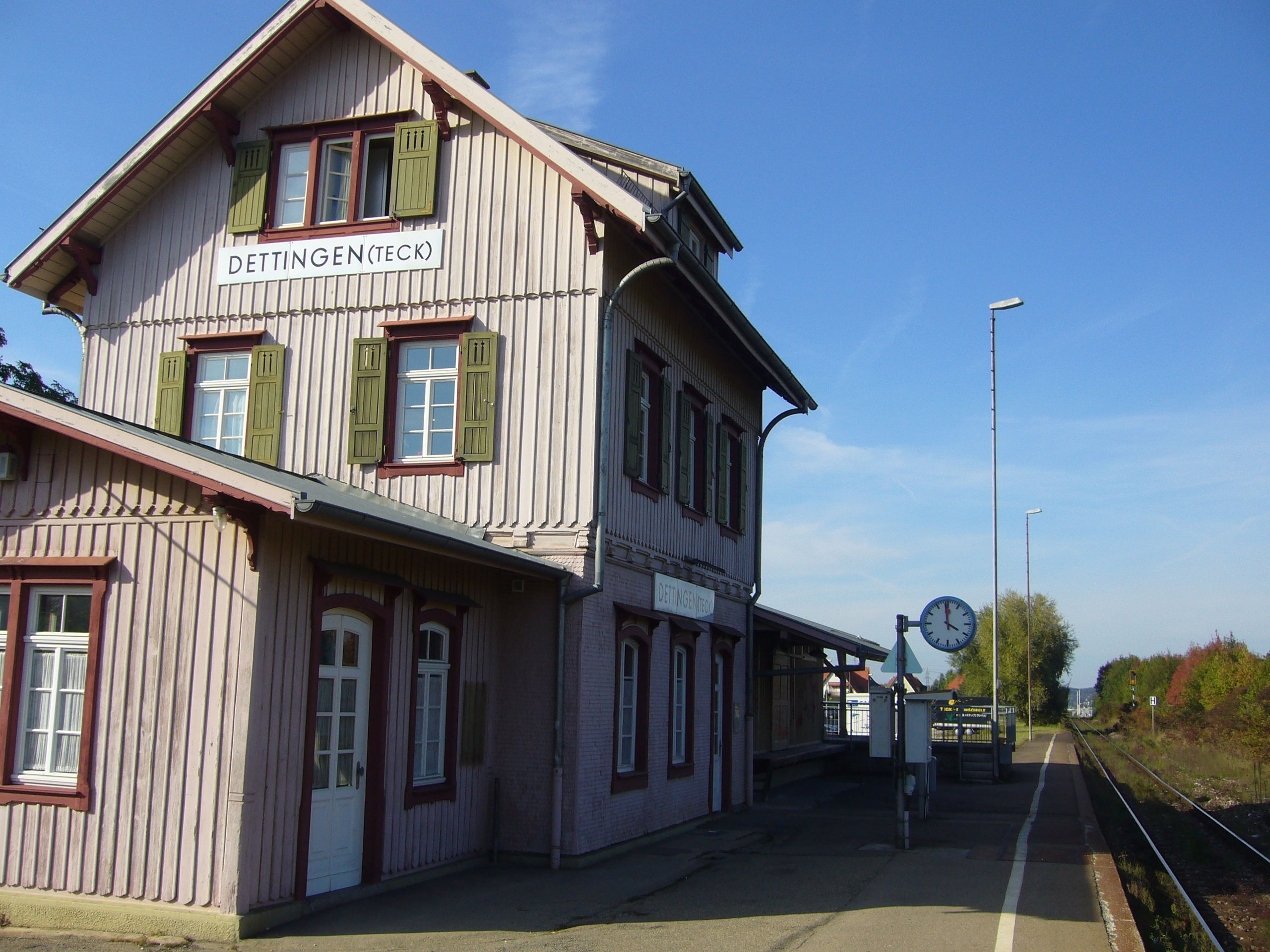
Former Dettingen station (2007)

== Notable people from Dettingen ==
- Albert Pflüger (1879–1965), Politician (SPD), Member of Landtag

== Literature ==
(in German)

- Hans Schwenkel: Heimatbuch des Kreises Nürtingen (Band 2). Würzburg 1953, S. 177–206.
- Der Landkreis Esslingen. Herausgegeben vom Landesarchiv Baden-Württemberg i. V. mit dem Landkreis Esslingen, Jan Thorbecke Verlag, Ostfildern 2009, ISBN 978-3-7995-0842-1, Band 1, Seite 403.
- Albert Schüle: Heimatbuch der Gemeinde Dettingen unter Teck. Herausgegeben von der Gemeinde Dettingen unter Teck, Gottlieb & Osswald, Kirchheim 1981.
- Karl Buck: Luftfahrt an der Teck – Geschichte und Geschichten zur Fliegerei im Land an der Teck 1928–1958; Gleit-, Segel- und Motorflug. Fluggelände und Privatlandeplatz, Segelflugschule, Flugzeugbau. Buck, Ulm 2008, ISBN 978-3-00-023757-7.
