= Lauter (Neckar) =

River in Germany

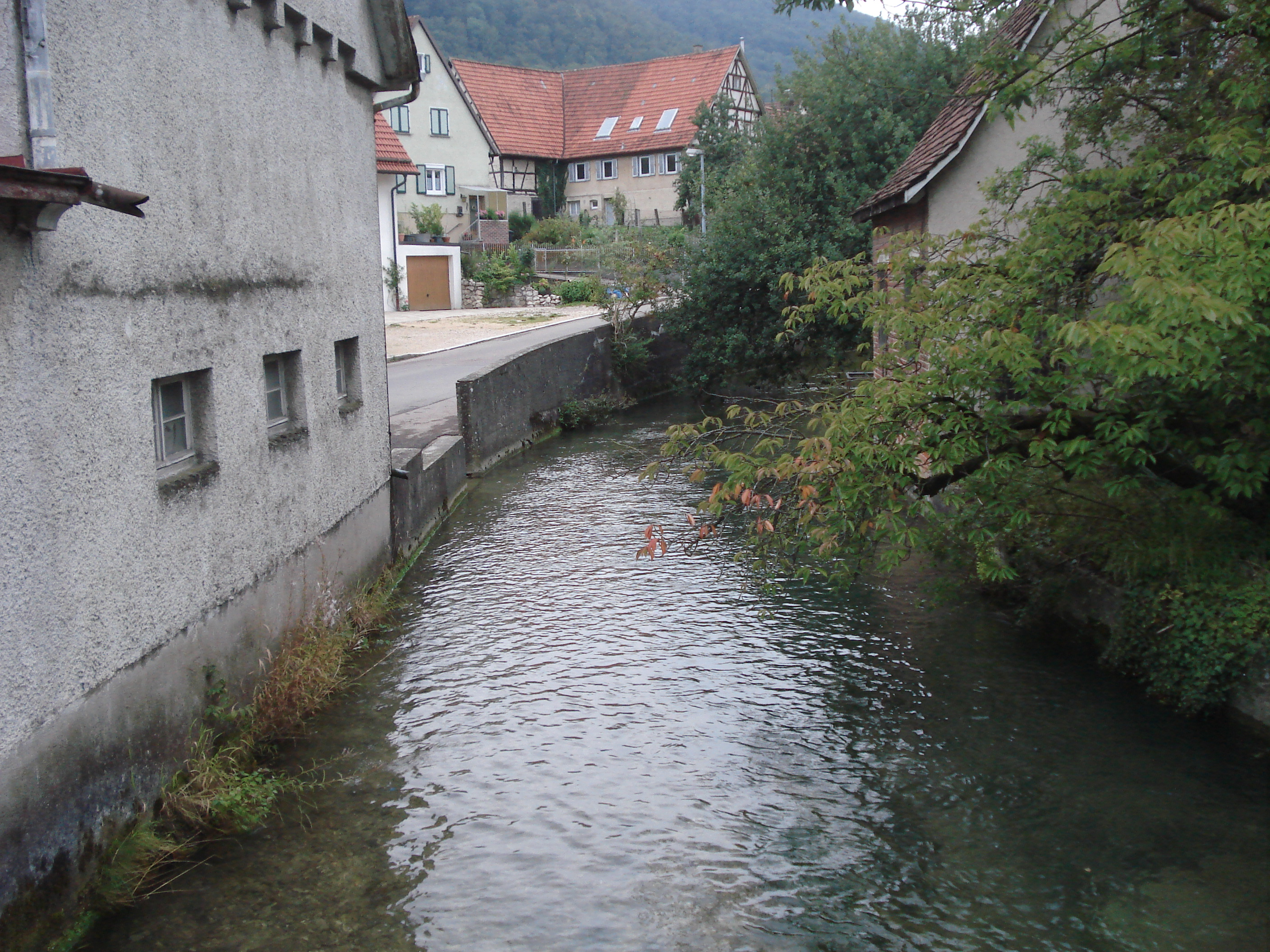

Location
- Country: Germany
- State: Baden-Württemberg

Physical characteristics
- Source
  - location: confluence of White Lauter and Black Lauter, near Lenningen
  - coordinates: 48°32′19″N 9°29′28″E
  - elevation: 470 m (1,540 ft)
- Mouth
  - location: confluence with Neckar near Wendlingen
  - coordinates: 48°41′3″N 9°22′46″E
  - elevation: 256 m (840 ft)
- Length: 25.8 km (16.0 mi)

Basin features
- Progression: Neckar→ Rhine→ North Sea
- Tributaries
  - right: Lindach

The Lauter (German pronunciation: [ˈlaʊtɐ]) is a right tributary of the Neckar in Baden-Württemberg, Germany. It arises on the Albtrauf escarpment of the Swabian Alb.

== History ==
The Lauter is formed by the confluence of the White Lauter, which rises east of Gutenberg and the Black Lauter, which arises near Schlattstall in Lenningen. Both streams are fed from multiple sources at each edge of the valley. The villages are part of the district of Esslingen.

It flows through the municipalities of Lenningen, Owen, Dettingen unter Teck, Kirchheim unter Teck and Wendlingen am Neckar. Its principal tributary is the Lindach in Kirchheim. The Lauter flows into the Neckar at Wendlingen. It has a length of 25.8 km (including White Lauter).

== History ==
The Celts already roamed the Lauter valley on their search for food. In ancient times, the Romans built a limes in the lowlands of the flood plain and a fort in Dettingen unter Teck for its protection.

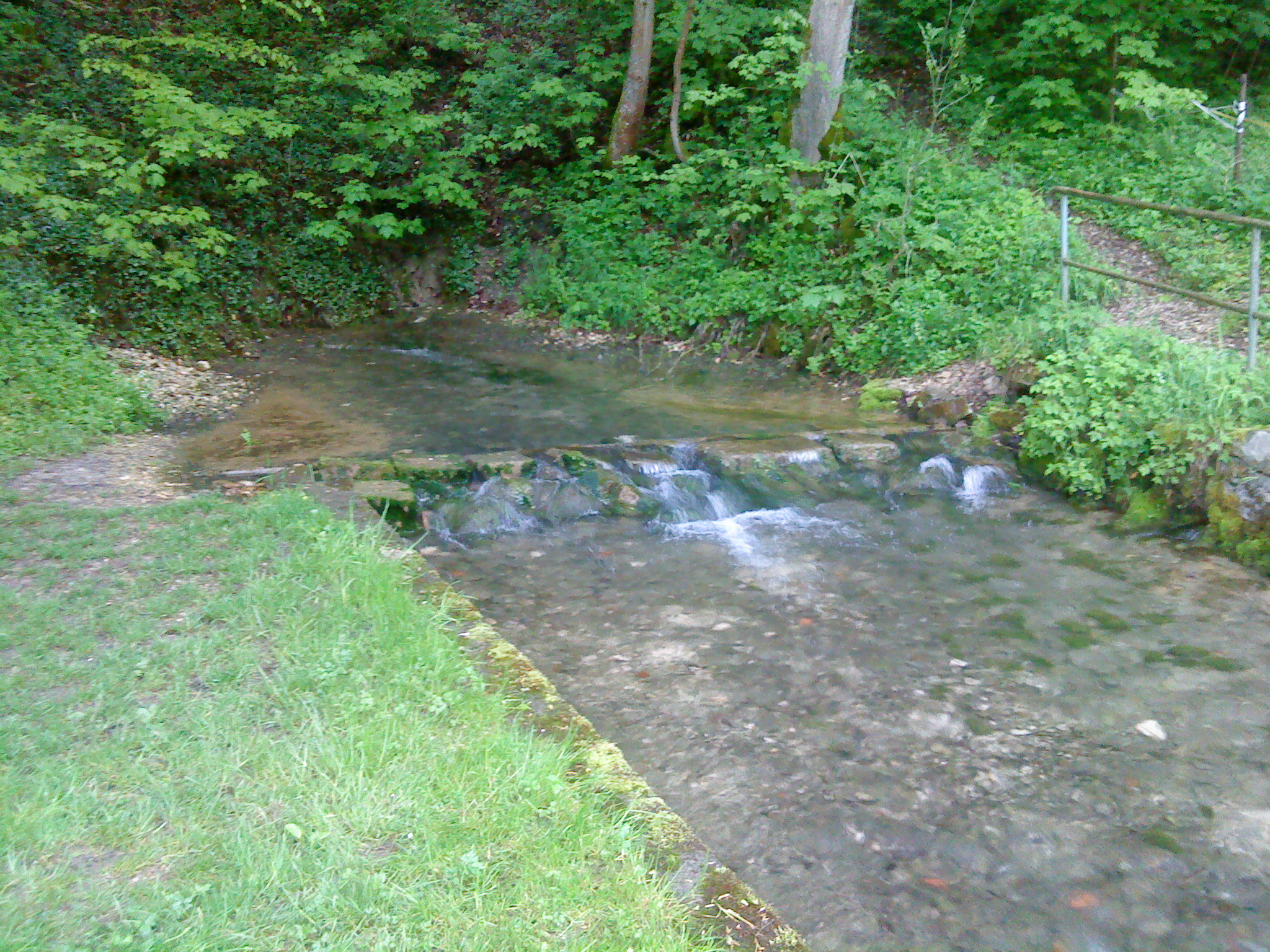
Source of the Black Lauter

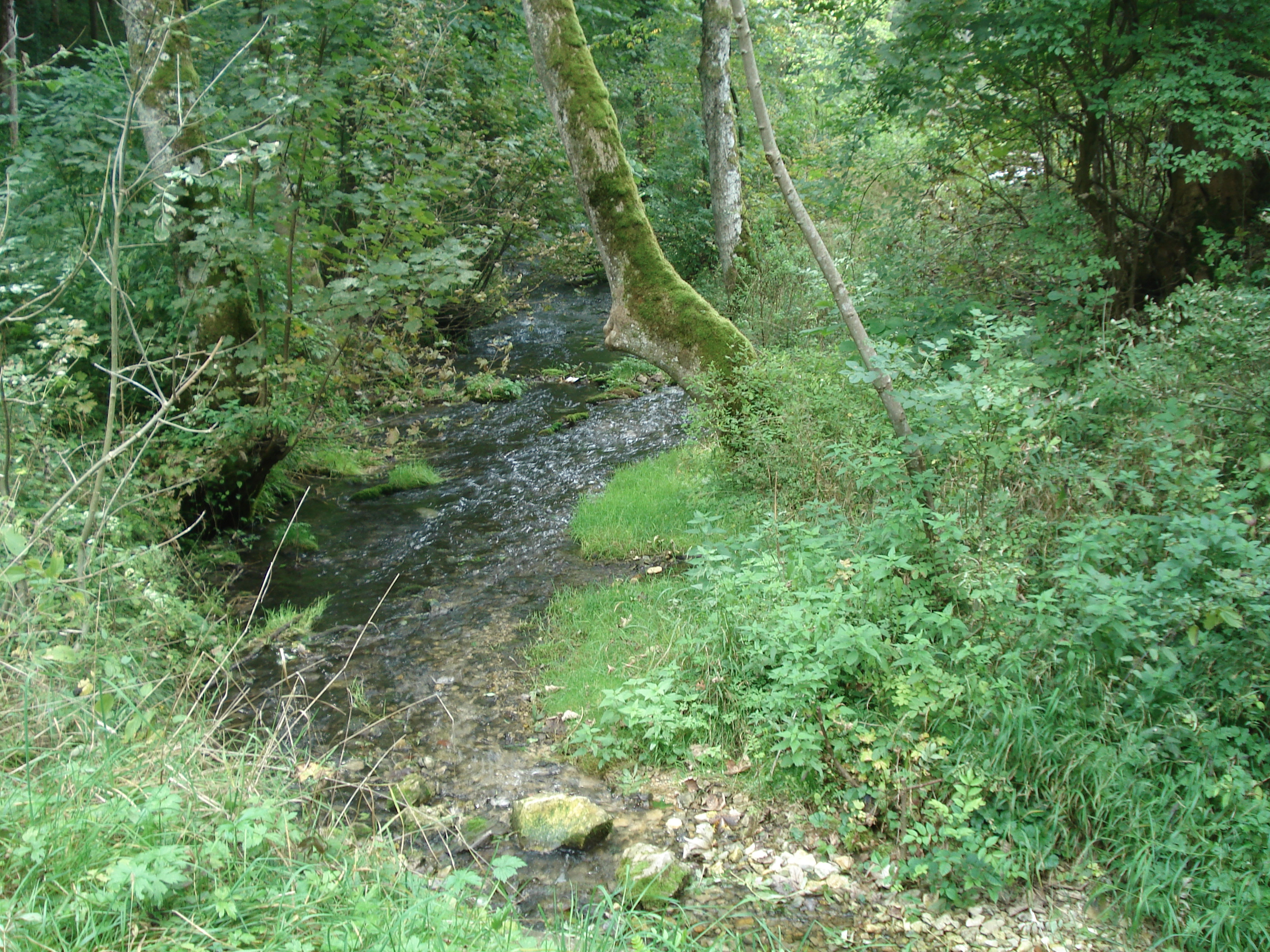
Source of the White Lauter
