= Burg Teck =

Ducal castle in the kingdom of Württemberg

Coordinates: 48°35′17″N 9°28′14″E

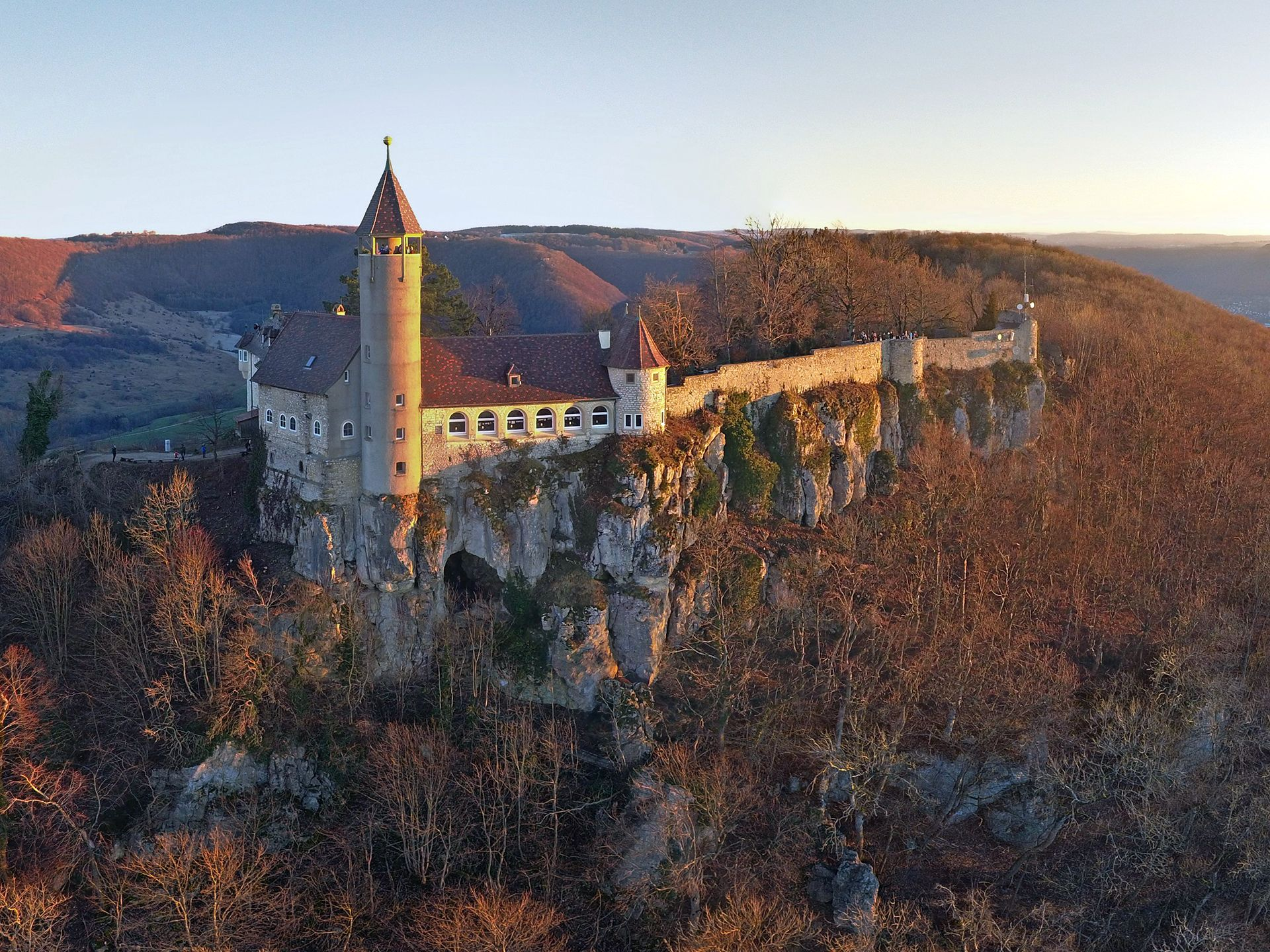
View of the site in 2020

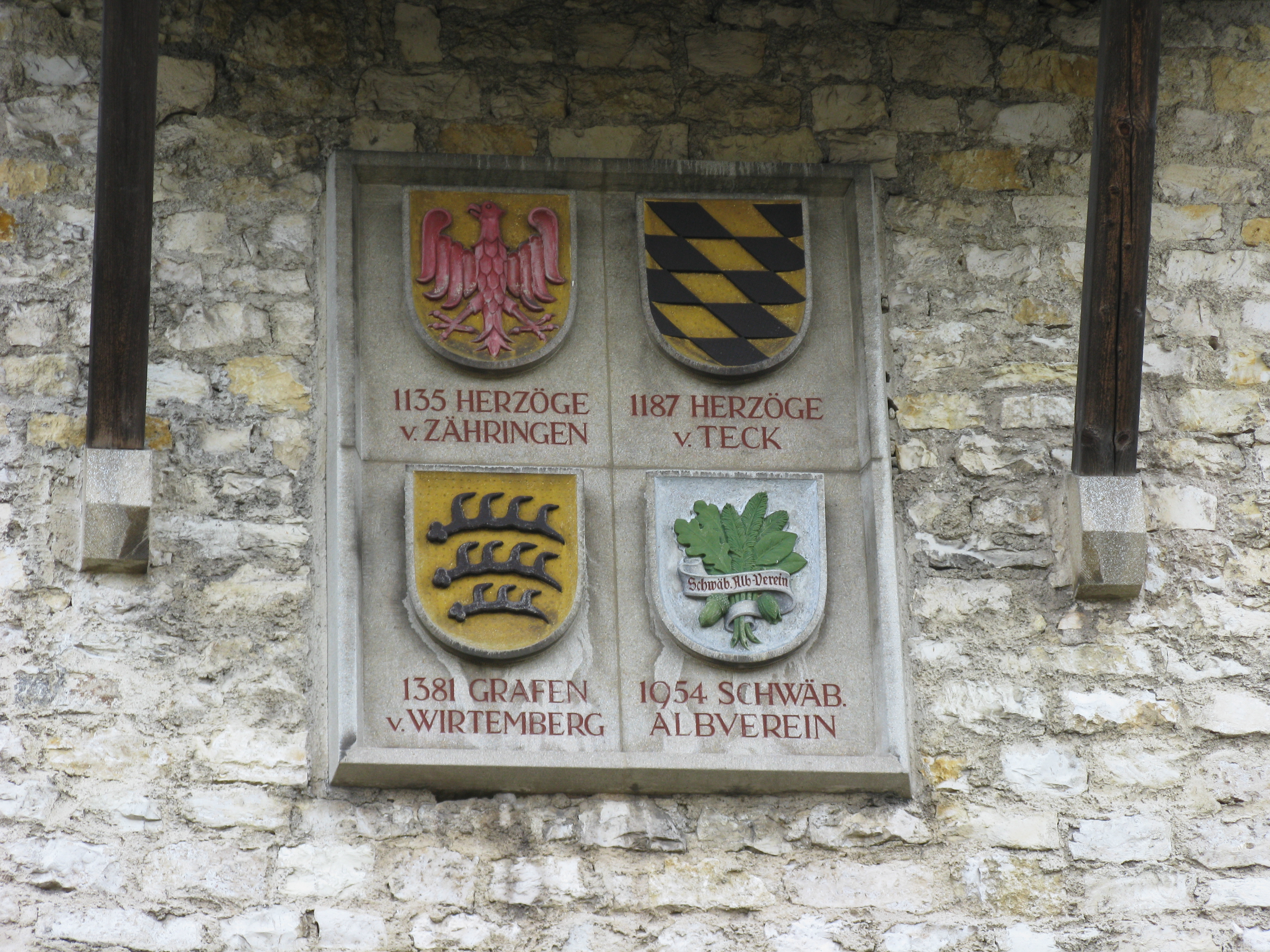
Arms of the site's various owners

Teck Castle (German: Burg Teck) was a ducal castle in the kingdom of Württemberg, immediately to the north of the Swabian Jura and south of the town of Kirchheim unter Teck (now in the district of Esslingen). The castle took its name from the Teckberg ridge, 2,544 feet (775 m) high, which it crowned. It was destroyed in the German Peasants' War (1525). The site's current buildings were constructed during the 19th and 20th centuries on the ruins of the original castle.

== Buildings ==
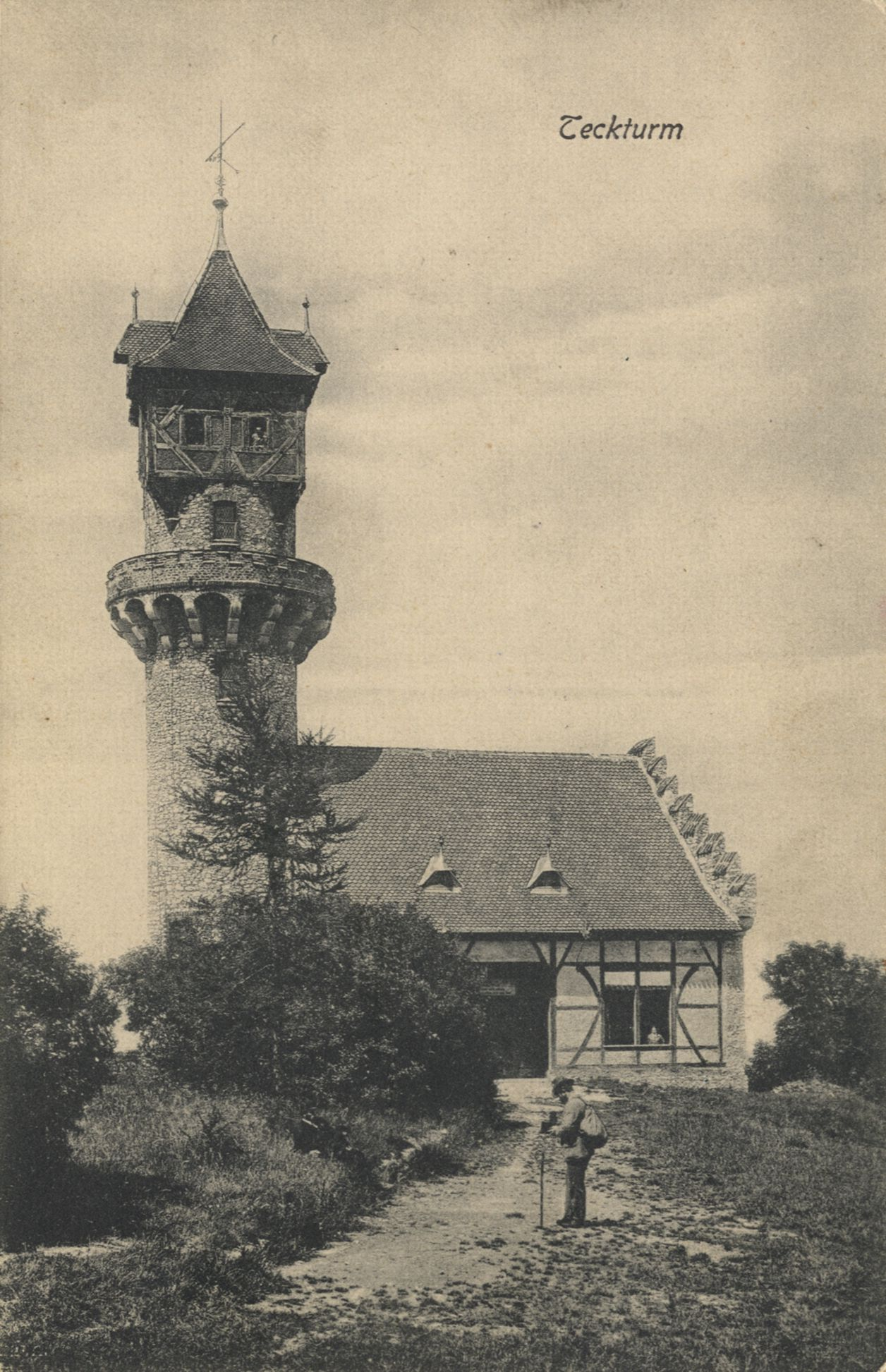
Teckturm (c. 1900)

In 1889, an observation tower (called the Teckturm) with a refuge shelter was built and inaugurated on 1 September 1889. A hall was built in 1933 near the tower, called Mörike Hall (Mörikehalle).

Since 6 June 1941, the buildings have been owned by the Schwäbischer Albverein. From 1954 to 1955, the Mörikehalle became a restaurant with sleeping rooms. On 9 November 1999, the area surrounding the site was designated a protected area (Naturschutzgebiet).

== Teck family ==
In 1863, the title "Prince of Teck" (Fürst von Teck) was conferred as a courtesy title by King William I of Württemberg upon the children of his cousin Duke Alexander of Württemberg (1804–85) by his morganatic marriage with Countess Claudine Rhédey von Kis-Rhéde (1812–41), ennobled as countess of Hohenstein. In 1871, Prince Francis, the eldest son of Duke Alexander, was created Duke of Teck. His eldest son Adolphus (born 1868) was the holder of the title in 1910.

The most famous member of the Teck family is considered to be Duke Francis's daughter, Mary of Teck, who was queen consort to King George V of the United Kingdom and Empress of India.
