= Albvorland Tunnel =

- Interactive map of Albvorland Tunnel

Overview
- Line: Wendlingen–Ulm high-speed railway
- Coordinates: 48.6620°N 9.3727°E (west portal); 48.6299°N 9.4696°E (east portal)
- Crosses: Bundesautobahn 8

Operation
- Work began: 2016
- Constructed: 29 October 2019 (tunnelling)
- Opened: 11 December 2022 (north tunnel); December 2026 (south tunnel)

Technical
- Length: 8.176 km (5.080 mi)
- No. of tracks: 2 (freight connection at west portal)
- Track gauge: 1,435 mm (4 ft 8 1/2 in) standard gauge
- Electrified: 15 kV 16.7 Hz AC overhead line
- Operating speed: 250 km/h
- Width: 9.6 m (31 ft)
- Cross passages: 16

The Albvorland Tunnel is a 8,176 m long twin-tube railway tunnel on the Wendlingen–Ulm high-speed railway in Baden-Württemberg. It underpasses a part of the town Kirchheim-Lindorf and Bundesautobahn 8 at the junction of Kirchheim-East in the industrial area of Dettingen unter Teck The tunnel is situated between kilometer 30.168 and 38.342 on the railway line. It is on the boundary of Wendlingen am Neckar, Kirchheim unter Teck, Lindorf and Dettingen unter Teck. It also underpasses a high pressure gas line and a NATO fuel line.

== Construction ==
The geology along the route is primarily made up of bedded claystone and clay-marlstone, belonging to the Swabian Black Jurassic (Lias) formation. In some areas, sandstone and limestone strata are also present. The maximum overburden is 65 meters, while the minimum is 9.5 meters. Due to the geological conditions, high water pressure was anticipated. This tunnel is part of section 2.1a/b of the railway line.

The costs of €270 million were expected in a newspaper in April 2014, confirmed by the government. In April 2009, the rough costs were calculated at €16.5 million per kilometre. The total cost of section 2.1 will be €798.7 million (at 2010 prices).

The call for competition for the tunnel's construction had 8 bidders. The order was valued at €377 million and was awarded on 18 December 2015 to Swiss company, Implenia.

In a planning paper from Deutsche Bahn (March 2012), planning approval was expected for 2014, with the start of work expected in 2014 and end of work in 2021. In Spring 2014, the contractor delayed the plan approval to beginning of 2015 and the start to 2016.

Tunneling on the south tunnel began on November 9, 2017, with TBM Wanda (an acronym of Wendlingen am Neckar durchs (through) Albvorland) and on the north tunnel in January 2018 with TBM Sibylle (named after the local legend of Sibylle von der Teck). The 10.87 m wide, 137m long, 2300 t, 4400 kW Herrenknecht earth pressure balance TBMs completed tunnelling on October 29, 2019, after advancing an average of 15 m a day, and installing 3989 pre-cast segment rings. Alongside these parallel drives, some conventional construction with blasting and excavators was used at the western portal for around 380 m.

A total of 4.8 million tons of material were removed by the TBMs. In the winter of 2017/8, they encountered pyrite, at a depth of c. 12m, in a 18 m thick layer, causing an estimated cost pressure of €140 million, due to concerns of sulfates entering the groundwater supply and issues surrounding its disposal.

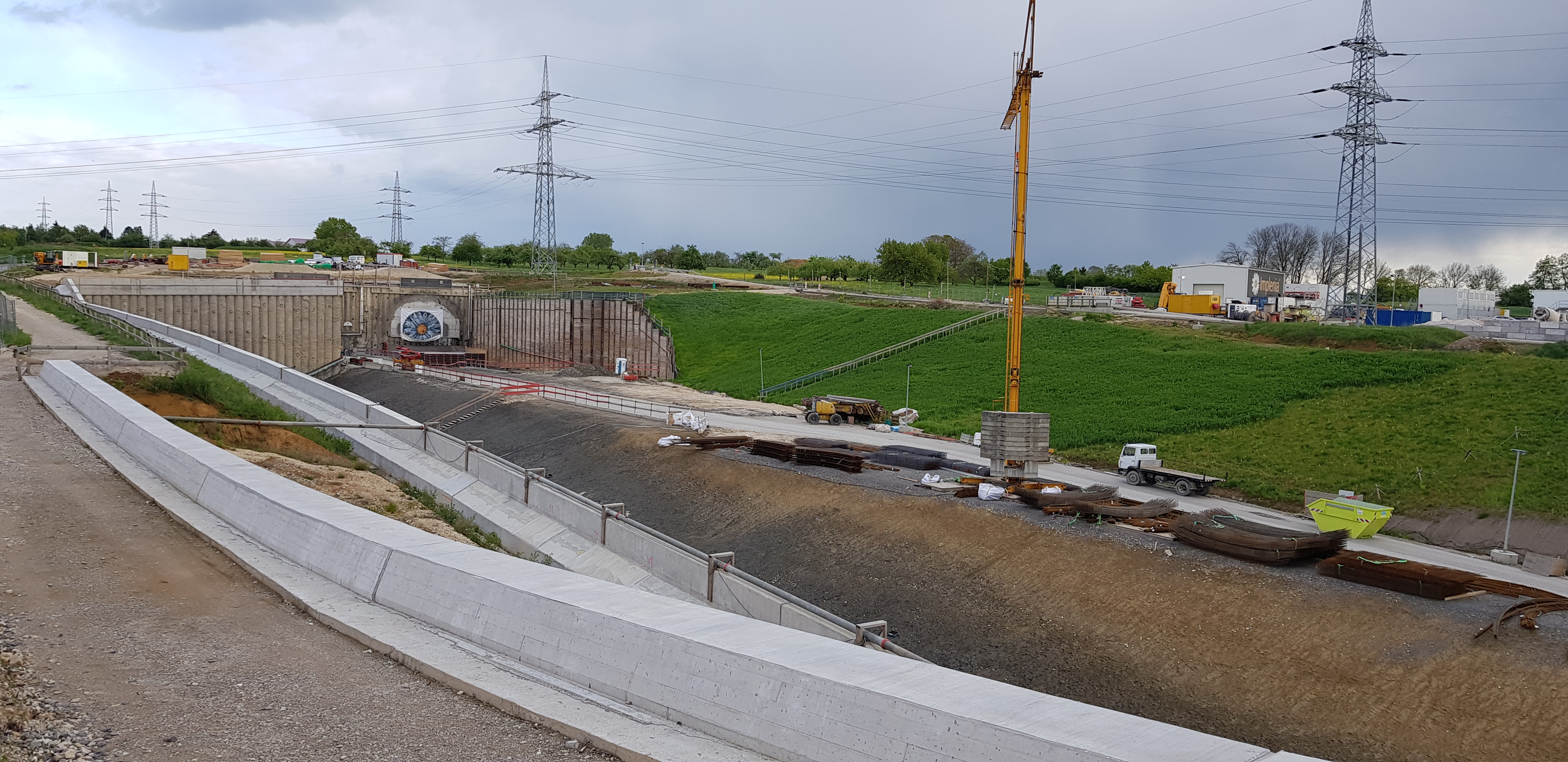
View of western portal in May 2019

The north tunnel, with its freight connection, opened on 11 December 2022, with the timetable change. A c. 12 km section, which includes the tunnel, is being used for passenger services in both directions on a single track. Full operation in both tunnels is scheduled to begin in December 2026 with the opening of the Stuttgart–Wendlingen high-speed railway.

== Tunnel ==
The twin tube tunnel has an additional short 520m freight line connection at its western portal (with a 173 m long tunnel under Bundesautobahn 8, a 320 m open section and a 200 m tunnel to join the north bore). A link to the Stuttgart-Tübingen line is also situated close to the western portal, with a 494 m long tunnel, known as the Kleine Wendlinger Kurve.

A 50 m structure at the western portal and 80 m at the eastern portal with 6–9 m^{2} side openings are used to reduce sudden changes in air pressure and subsequent audible tunnel boom (situated at 26.077 to 26.127 km and 34.173 to 34.253 km respectively).

The tunnel uses slab track and has LED illuminated safety lighting on the handrails throughout its length. The tunnel safety lighting can be activated by the train crew using a button in the tunnel in the event of an incident. The tunnels have a rescue area at each portal measuring approximately 1500 m^{2} each. It is electrified using Re 330 type catenary. The track is equipped with ETCS level 2 baseline 3 signalling as with the rest of the line, as well as a hot axlebox and seized brake detector fitted at the 31.783 km mark. The tunnels have a curve radius of 3986 m. The Rheda 2000 slab track used has a driveable surface for emergency vehicles.

The two single-track tubes are connected by 16 cross passages, spaced every 475 m, measuring 14–24 m in length, 4.6 m in width, and 4.0 m in height.
