= Main Line for Europe =

Paris-Bratislava railway upgrade plan

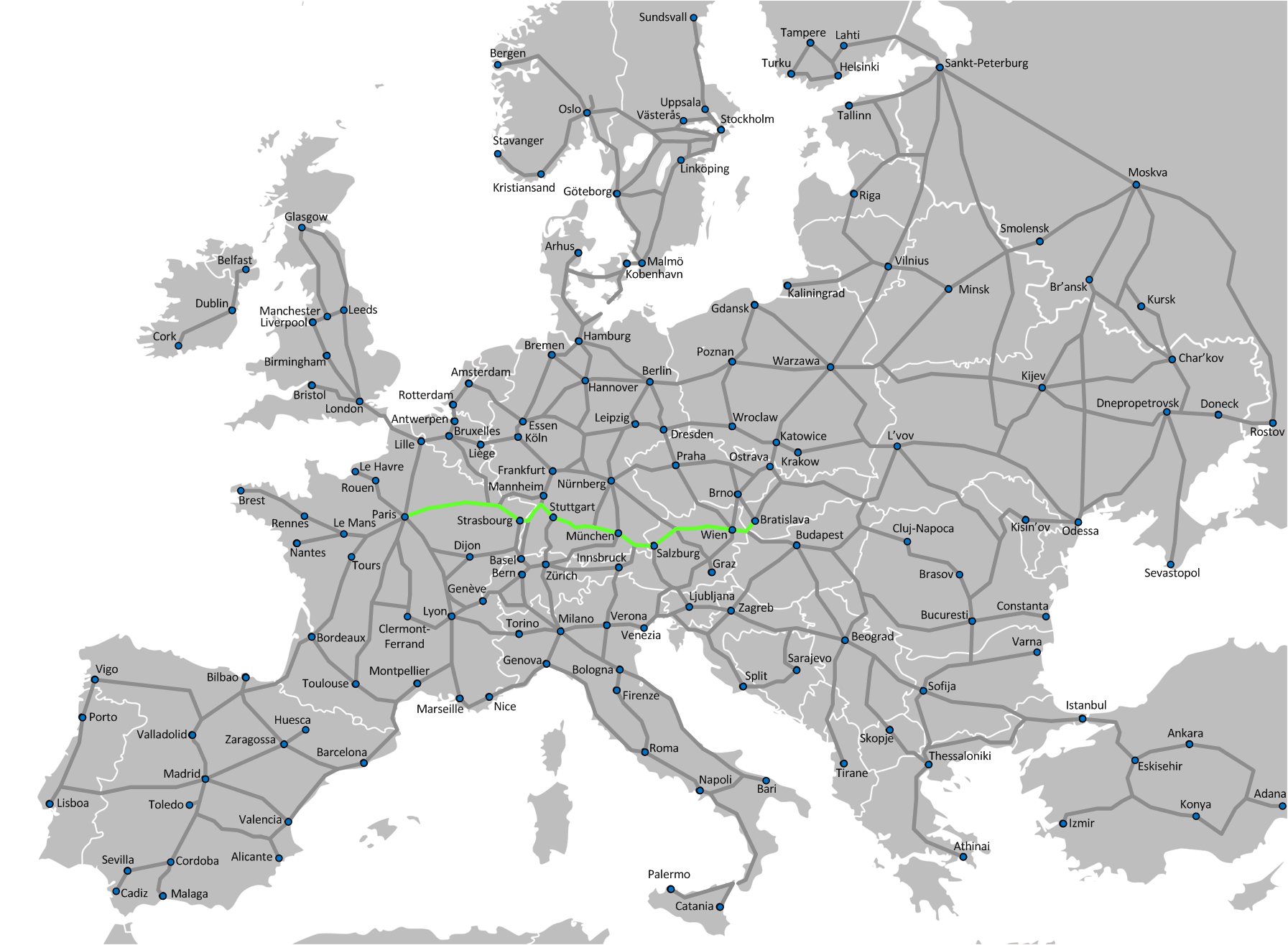
Planned high-speed rail link Paris—Bratislava

The Magistrale for Europe (German: Magistrale für Europa; French: Magistrale européenne) or Main Line for Europe is a Trans-European Transport Networks (TEN-T) project for the creation of a high-speed railway line between Paris and Bratislava, with a branch-off to Budapest. It was listed as TEN project No. 17 (Paris—Bratislava) by the European Commission in 1995, and is already under way.

The project was planned to be completed by 2020, however the entire project has not been delivered on time, with only some of the sections running. It will link 34 million people in five European countries. The overall length of the route from Paris to Budapest is 1,562 km (971 mi).

== Sections ==
Detail from the map of Europe's high-speed rail lines (colored), where can be seen the Main Line for Europe's route (Paris-Strasbourg-Stuttgart-München-Salzburg-Linz-Wien-Bratislava-Budapest) and its current maximum operational speed.
Max operational speed 310-320 km/h
Max operational speed 270-300 km/h
Max operational speed 240-260 km/h
Max operational speed 200-230 km/h
Under construction for max operational speed ≥ 200 km/h
Max operational speed < 200 km/h

Parts of the route were formerly served by Orient Express trains, which ceased operations in 2009. Today TGV rail connections exist from Paris to Stuttgart or at longest Munich. The Austrian Federal Railways (ÖBB) currently provide direct Railjet and EuroNight connections between Munich and Budapest in addition to direct Nightjet connection between Vienna and Paris since December 2021.

=== France ===
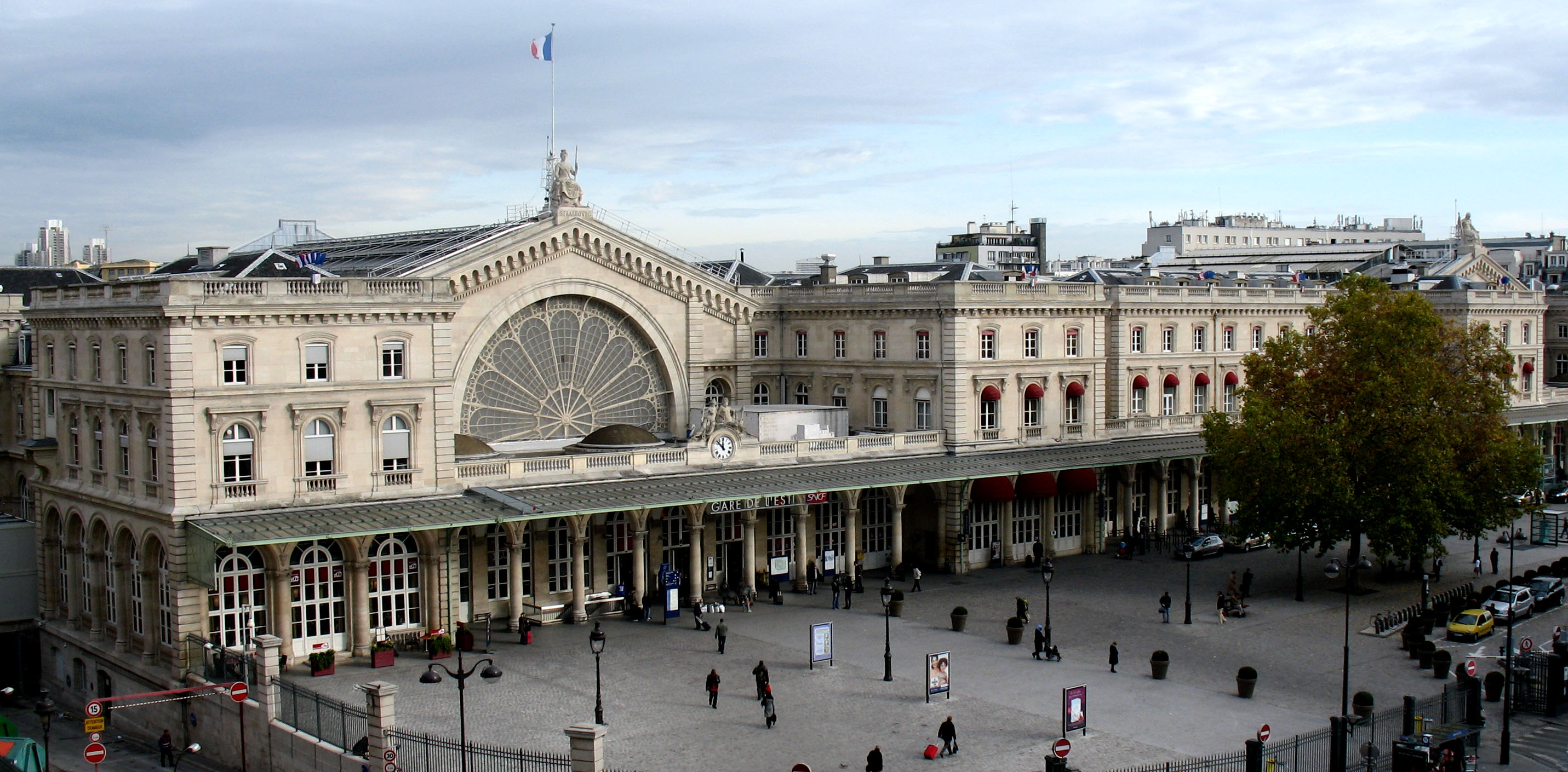
Paris Gare de l'Est

The French part of the line is the LGV Est européenne high-speed railway. Its first section as far as Baudrecourt east of Metz has been in use since 2007 whilst the second section to Vendenheim near Strasbourg opened in July 2016. The new railway line provides a maximum speed up to 320 km/h (199 mph) and reduced the travel time from Gare de Paris-Est to the largely refurbished Gare de Strasbourg to 1h 45' .

=== Germany ===
In Germany, the line follows the Appenweier–Strasbourg railway (Europabahn) from the Rhine Bridge to Appenweier and then the Mannheim–Karlsruhe–Basel railway (Rheintalbahn) down to Bruchsal. The Europabahn is built for a maximum speed of 200 km/h (124 mph), while the Rheintalbahn to Rastatt Süd is for 250 km/h (155 mph). The second part of the new Rheintalbahn (Rastatt Süd to Bruchsal) is to be completed by 2014. At the Bruchsal Rollenberg junction the MoE joins the Mannheim–Stuttgart high-speed railway which was built for 250 km/h (155 mph). Stuttgart Hauptbahnhof is currently being rebuilt (scheduled for completion in December 2026) as a through station in the course of the controversial Stuttgart 21 project. Despite some protests, a 2011 statewide referendum upheld the majority support and thus the political decision to rebuild the station and let the Magistrale for Europe project proceed.

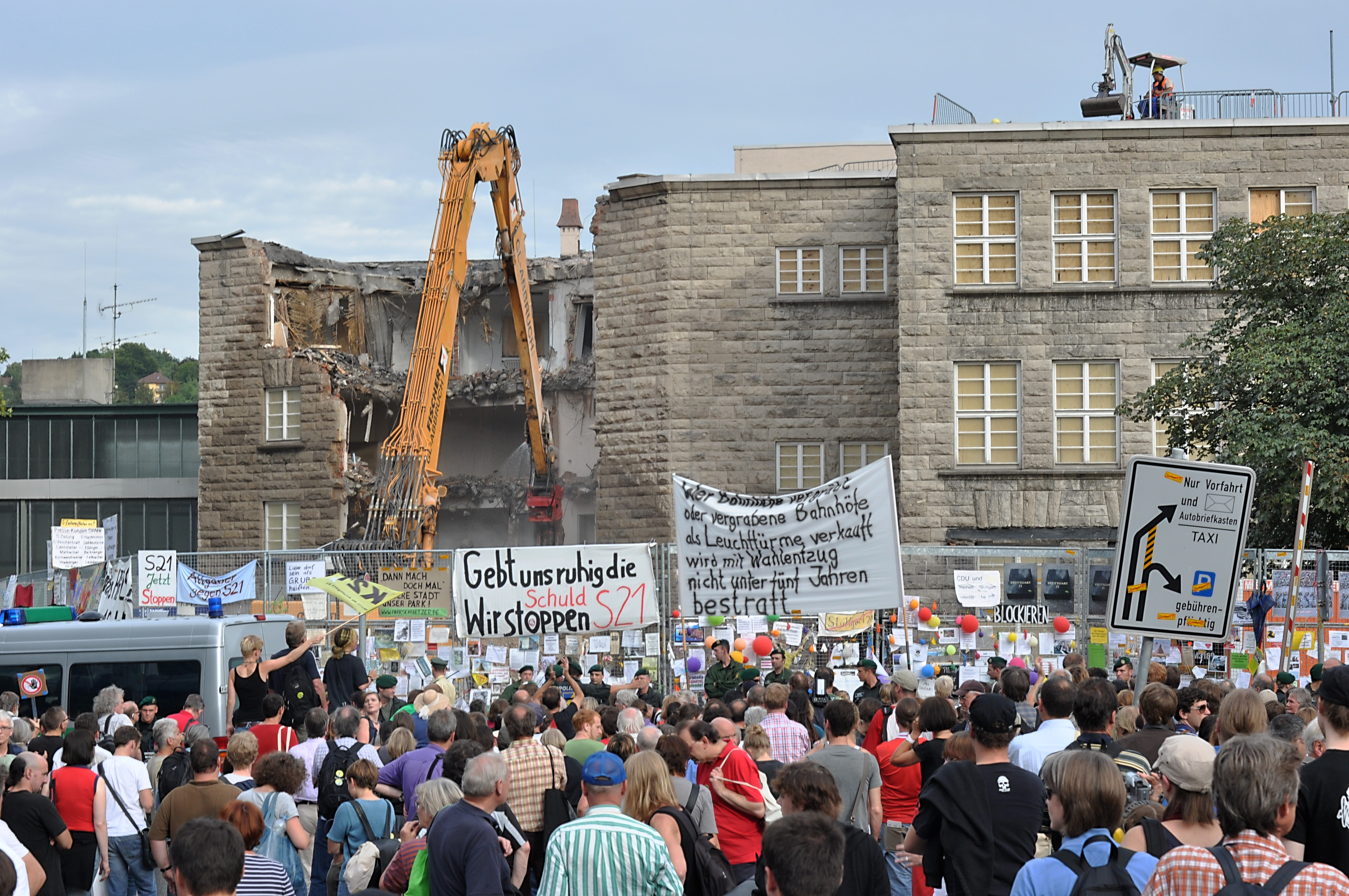
Demolition works on Stuttgart Hauptbahnhof, 2010

In Stuttgart, the line joins the Stuttgart–Augsburg new and upgraded railway (including the Stuttgart–Wendlingen and Wendlingen–Ulm high-speed railway lines replacing the Fils Valley Railway). The Wendlingen-Ulm section was completed at the end of 2022 and provides a maximum speed of 250 km/h (155 mph) between Stuttgart and Ulm and 200 km/h (124 mph) on the Ulm–Augsburg railway line. A dedicated high-speed line between Ulm and Augsburg with high speeds of 250 km/h (155 mph) is currently in the planning stages. The Munich–Augsburg railway was upgraded to separate slower traffic (freight and short-distance trains) from high speed trains in 2011, with maximum speeds of 230 km/h (143 mph). From München-Pasing trains may run directly to München Ost without passing München Hauptbahnhof. Plans for the reconstruction of the Munich main station similar to Stuttgart 21 have been abandoned.

Trains from München Ost shall reach Salzburg Hauptbahnhof, or otherwise continue directly to Linz Hauptbahnhof via the upgraded Munich–Mühldorf railway, providing a maximum speed of 200 km/h (120 mph), and the Mühldorf–Freilassing railway line. In Freilassing the MoE joins the Rosenheim–Salzburg railway leading across the Austrian border including a new third track serving the Salzburg S-Bahn commuter network.

=== Austria ===
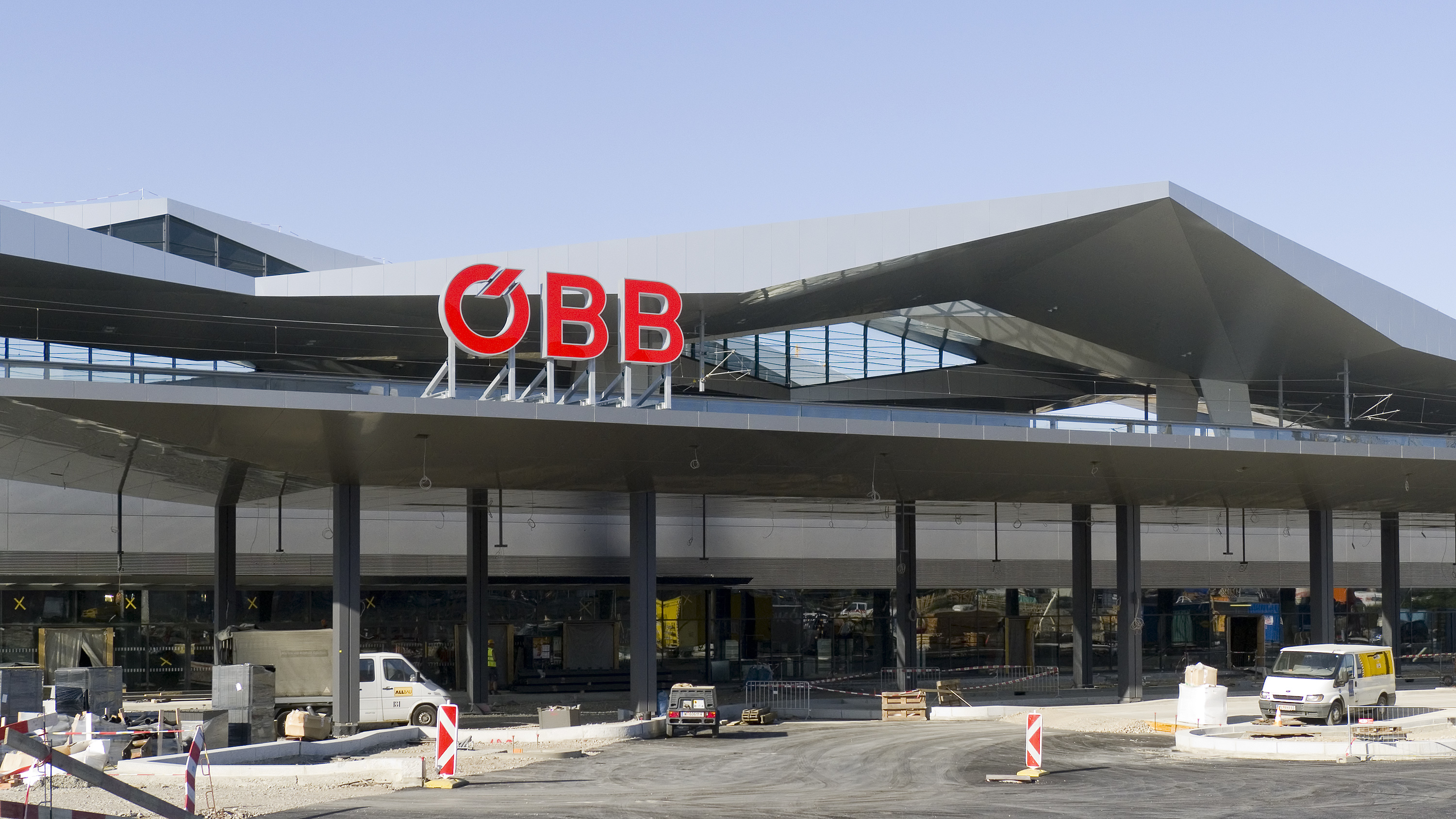
Vienna main station, 2012

In Austria, the Western Railway line was extended to reduce travel time between Munich, Salzburg, Linz, and Vienna to one hour each. The section between the Attnang-Puchheim rail hub and Wels Hauptbahnhof near Linz was already upgraded until October 2012 to provide a maximum speed of 230 km/h (143 mph). Between Linz and Vienna a new parallel high-speed railway line (Neue Westbahn) for a maximum speed of 250 km/h (155 mph) was completed in 2015, including the Wienerwald Tunnel.

In Vienna, the former Südbahnhof terminal station was demolished and replaced by the new Wien Hauptbahnhof. From here, trains run on the Eastern Railway line to Bratislava-Petržalka railway station, including a connection to Vienna International Airport. East of Vienna, a southeastern branch-off leads via Győr to Budapest.

== Route ==
Section	Distance	Opening	Duration before^{1}	Recent duration^{1}	Planned duration^{1}
Paris–Strasbourg	440.2 km	Paris–Baudrecourt 2007	237 min (ø 127 km/h)	105 min (ø 252 km/h)	-
Paris–Strasbourg	440.2 km	Baudrecourt–Vendenheim 2016	237 min (ø 127 km/h)	105 min (ø 252 km/h)	-
Strasbourg–Karlsruhe	81.6 km	a portion (Appenweier-Karlsruhe) is in use now		40 min (ø 122 km/h)	25 min (ø 194 km/h)
Karlsruhe–Stuttgart	90 km	in use	61 min (ø 89 km/h)	35 min (ø 154 km/h)	35 min (ø 154 km/h)
Stuttgart–Ulm	25.2 km	Stuttgart–Wendlingen high-speed railway After 2026		54 min (ø 104 km/h)	28 min (ø 174 km/h)
Stuttgart–Ulm	60 km	Wendlingen–Ulm high-speed railway 2022		54 min (ø 104 km/h)	28 min (ø 174 km/h)
Ulm–Augsburg	85 km	Ulm–Augsburg railway upgrade 2025		41 min (ø 126 km/h)	26 min (ø 198 km/h)
Augsburg–Munich	61 km	2011		37 min (ø 99 km/h)	18 min (ø 203 km/h)
Munich–Mühldorf–Salzburg (northern line, 155.3 km)	85 km	Munich–Mühldorf upgrade		87 min (ø 106 km/h)	62 min (ø 148 km/h)
Munich–Mühldorf–Salzburg (northern line, 155.3 km)	65 km	Mühldorf–Freilassing upgrade		87 min (ø 106 km/h)	62 min (ø 148 km/h)
Munich–Mühldorf–Salzburg (northern line, 155.3 km)	5 km	Freilassing–Salzburg upgrade 2009		87 min (ø 106 km/h)	62 min (ø 148 km/h)
Munich–Rosenheim–Salzburg (southern line, 153.5 km)	65 km	Munich–Rosenheim upgrade		? min (ø ? km/h)	? min (ø ? km/h)
Munich–Rosenheim–Salzburg (southern line, 153.5 km)	82 km	Rosenheim–Freilassing upgrade		? min (ø ? km/h)	? min (ø ? km/h)
Munich–Rosenheim–Salzburg (southern line, 153.5 km)	5 km	Freilassing–Salzburg upgrade 2009		? min (ø ? km/h)	? min (ø ? km/h)
Salzburg–Linz	127 km	Salzburg–Attnang-Puchheim 2013		64 min (ø 119 km/h)	60 min (ø 127 km/h)
Salzburg–Linz	127 km	Attnang-Puchheim–Wels 2011		64 min (ø 119 km/h)	60 min (ø 127 km/h)
Salzburg–Linz	127 km	Wels–Linz (Linz–Marchtrenk) 2028		64 min (ø 119 km/h)	60 min (ø 127 km/h)
Linz–St. Pölten	130 km	Doubling to 4 tracks 2024–2030		48 min (ø 163 km/h)	44 min (ø 177 km/h)
St.Pölten-Vienna	44 km	2012	41 min (ø 64 km/h)	25 min (ø 106 km/h)	
Vienna–Budapest	263 km			181 min (ø 87 km/h)	
Vienna–Marchegg–Bratislava (northern line)	65 km	Marchegger Ostbahn upgrade 2025; Bratislava–Marchegg railway line upgrade	65 min	57 min (ø 68 km/h)	40 min (ø 111 km/h)
Vienna–Parndorf–Bratislava (southern line)	80 km	2013			55 min (ø 87 km/h)
total:
Paris–Budapest	1562 km			722 min (12:02)^{1 2} (ø 132 km/h)	614 min (10:14)^{1 2} (ø 155 km/h)
Paris–Bratislava (northern line)	1364 km			598 min (9:58)^{1 2} (ø 140 km/h)	468 min (7:40)^{1 2} (ø 178 km/h)
Paris–Bratislava (southern line)	1379 km				488 min (8:08)^{1 2} (ø 173 km/h)
Paris–Munich	843 km		484 min (8:04)^{1 2} (ø 108 km/h)	317 min (5:17) ^{1} (ø 166 km/h)	242 min (4:02) ^{1} (ø 216 km/h)

^{1 It is calculated with the fastest possible durations between the towns.}
^{2 Real duration is longer due to changing.}

^{Source (unless stated otherwise): annual report 2006/07 of Péter Balázs}

== See also ==
- High-speed rail in France
- High-speed rail in Germany
- High-speed rail in Italy
