= Stuttgart–Augsburg new and upgraded railway =

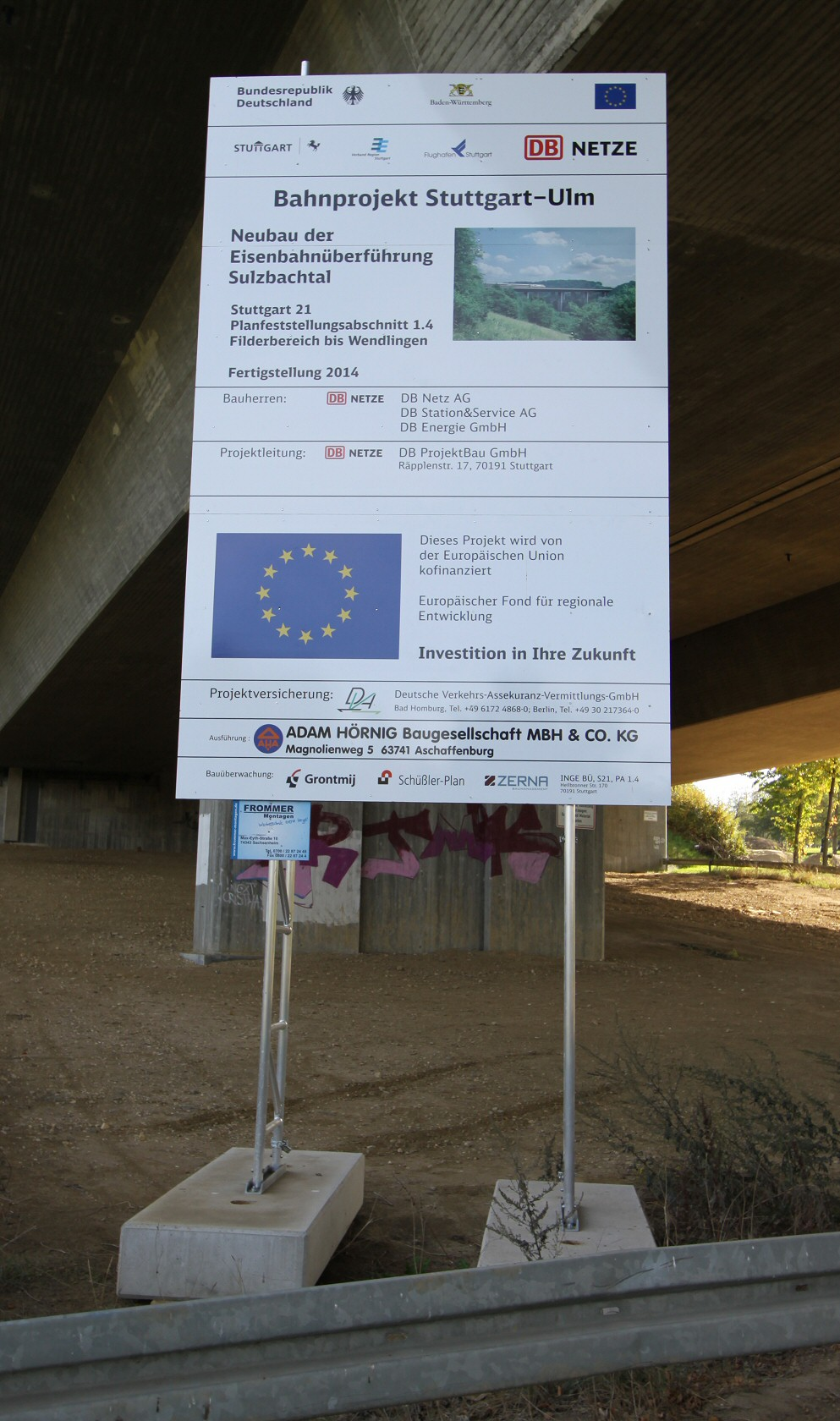
Information sign on the Stuttgart–Ulm section construction (2012)

Stuttgart–Augsburg new and upgraded line is a proposed German railway project.

The 2003 federal transport plan included it as an urgent project. It includes a new high-speed line between Stuttgart and Ulm with a maximum speed of 250 km/h, parallel to the existing Stuttgart–Ulm line and an upgraded Ulm–Augsburg line with a design speed of up to 200 km/h. On 19 July 2007 it was announced by the Federal Government, the State of Baden-Württemberg and Deutsche Bahn AG that the project had been officially approved. The estimated cost of the whole project is € 4.088 billion, with funding to be provided by Deutsche Bahn (€ 1,469 million), Federal Government and the European Union (€ 1,229 million), Baden-Württemberg (€ 824 million), Stuttgart city (€ 239 million) Stuttgart region (€ 100 million) and the owners of Stuttgart Airport (€ 100 million).

The project consists of the following components:

- Stuttgart 21 & Stuttgart–Wendlingen high-speed railway: replacement of the current Stuttgart terminal station by an underground through station connecting via the Filder tunnel to Stuttgart Airport.
- Wendlingen-Ulm high-speed line: construction of a high-speed line through the Swabian Alb, largely paralleling the A 8, and reconstruction of the Danube bridge in Ulm to carry four tracks, in place of two.
- Neu-Ulm 21: replacement of the Neu-Ulm station with a new underground station (opened in March 2007, estimated cost € 160 million euro).
- Upgrading of the Neu-Ulm–Augsburg section of the Ulm–Augsburg line for speeds of up to 200 km/h.

The Stuttgart–Augsburg new and upgraded line is a component of the Magistrale for Europe from Paris to Budapest, which is supported by the European Union as part of its Trans-European Networks. The European Union is providing up to 50 per cent of the planning phase of the project and is expected to fund ten per cent of its construction costs.

When complete, high-speed trains will take 28 minutes between Stuttgart and Ulm and trains between Stuttgart and Munich with stops in Ulm and Augsburg will take less than one and a half hours compared to more than two hours today. This is part of Deutsche Bahn's Netz 21 (network 21) concept, which envisages a reduction of the travel time between Frankfurt and Munich from over three and a half today to only two and a half hours in the future. The Stuttgart-Ulm section is expected to be completed in December 2025 (as of 2010 it was expected to be completed in 2020).
