= Centre for Efficient Transport =

Czech think tank

- Abbreviation: CEDOP
- Formation: 2009
- Type: non-profit
- Location: Prague
- Director: Tomáš Záruba
- Website: Official website

The Centre for Efficient Transport (Centrum pro efektivní dopravu, abbreviated CEDOP) is a Czech-based think tank that advocates the development of public and rail transport. Its seat is in Prague. The mission of the Centre is to promote public transport concepts for 21st century in the Czech Republic, based on best practice from European countries, especially Switzerland.

== Founding ==
The Centre was established in 2009 by Petr Šlegr, the former Deputy of Minister of Transport of the Czech Republic, along with Pavel Adámek and Marek Binko.

== Activities ==
=== Publications ===
The Centre issued a book named "Suburban Transport - The Backbone of Public Transport in Agglomerations" (ISBN 978-80-254-8087-8), which deals with the concept of city rail tunnels construction in order to be able to increase and better exploit the suburban rail in vicinity of large metropolises and enable direct connection from suburbs and satellite towns to city centres, and the possible implementation of such a concept in Prague.

In 2011, the Centre issued a second book named "High Speed Railway even in the Czech Republic" (ISBN 978-80-905005-0-1). The book informs about high-speed rail systems in few selected countries (Spain, France, Germany, and Switzerland) and describes a possible future network of the high-speed rail in the Czech republic. Focus is on benefits for the regions of the Czech republic

=== High Speed Rail conference in the Senate ===
The Centre organized a conference about the high-speed rail in cooperation with the Czech Senate in May 2011. At this conference, the Director General of the Czech Railways Mr. Petr Žaluda acknowledged that Czech Republic may become a European outsider if it does not start constructing the high-speed rail lines in the near future. He also stated that it is vital for Czech republic to build a connection to German high-speed network as soon as possible, as without it there is no reason in talking about the development of rail transport. He also stressed that without high-speed rail lines, even the Berlin-Vienna service will pass around the Czech territory, because it will be quicker that taking the shortest but neglected route via the Czech republic.

=== Czech Railways vs. Škoda dispute on Railjets ===
The Centre engaged itself in a dispute between the Škoda Transportation and Czech Railways regarding the planned purchase of Siemens Viaggio trainsets (known under the trade name Railjet), questioning the arguments of Škoda-ordered expertise conceived by the Faculty of Transport of the Czech Technical University. The Centre has disproved the arguments of the expertise about the purchase being financially disadvantageous and about the Czech railways serving no routes suitable for such trainset use. Also, according to the Centre, the expertise had underestimated both the timeline of high-speed rail construction in the Czech republic and the expected life cycle of the trainsets, as the expertise deemed the trainsets technically obsolete at the time of high-speed rail implementation in the Czech republic.
