= Stuttgart 21 =

Railway and urban development project in Stuttgart, Baden-Württemberg, Germany

Map of Stuttgart 21 project

Terminus station and S21 underground through-station, with white pedestrian bridge over the pit providing access to 16 platforms

Stuttgart 21 (for 21st century) is a major railway and urban development project in Stuttgart, Germany, that is replacing the surface railway lines with tunnels. It is a part of the Stuttgart–Augsburg new and upgraded railway and the Main Line for Europe (Paris—Vienna) within the framework of the Trans-European Networks. Its core is a renewed underground Stuttgart Hauptbahnhof, among some 57 kilometres (35 miles) of new railways, including some 30 kilometres (19 miles) of tunnels and 25 kilometres (16 miles) of high-speed lines. The project was highly controversial up to 2010, and still is since, due to destruction of old structures, large area construction works, high costs, and ongoing duration. The still operational central terminus station, with 16 surface platforms shortened and with impeded access due to the large construction pit, is going to be replaced by an underground through-station with only 8 platforms.

The project was officially announced in April 1994. Construction work began on 2 February 2010. In March 2013, total costs were officially estimated at €6.5 billion, the previous estimate being €4.5 billion in 2009. In March 2022, Deutsche Bahn estimated the total cost at €9.15 billion. Heated debate ensued on a broad range of issues, including the relative costs and benefits, geological and environmental concerns, as well as performance issues.

In 2019, operations had been expected to start in December 2025, delayed from the initial estimation of 2019 (made in 2010). In 2024, the opening date for main elements of the project was delayed again, to December 2026. In 2025, the planned opening date of December 2026 was canceled, officially due to technical issues with the new signaling system. By June 2026, a Deutsche Bahn audit found the 2026 commissioning date to be unrealistic. The new Stuttgart Hauptbahnhof is scheduled to open in December 2031, with associated works to be delivered in phases between 2027 and 2033. Total project costs had also risen by €3 billion to €14.5 billion.

== Concept ==
Principal track layout of the future Stuttgart main railway station

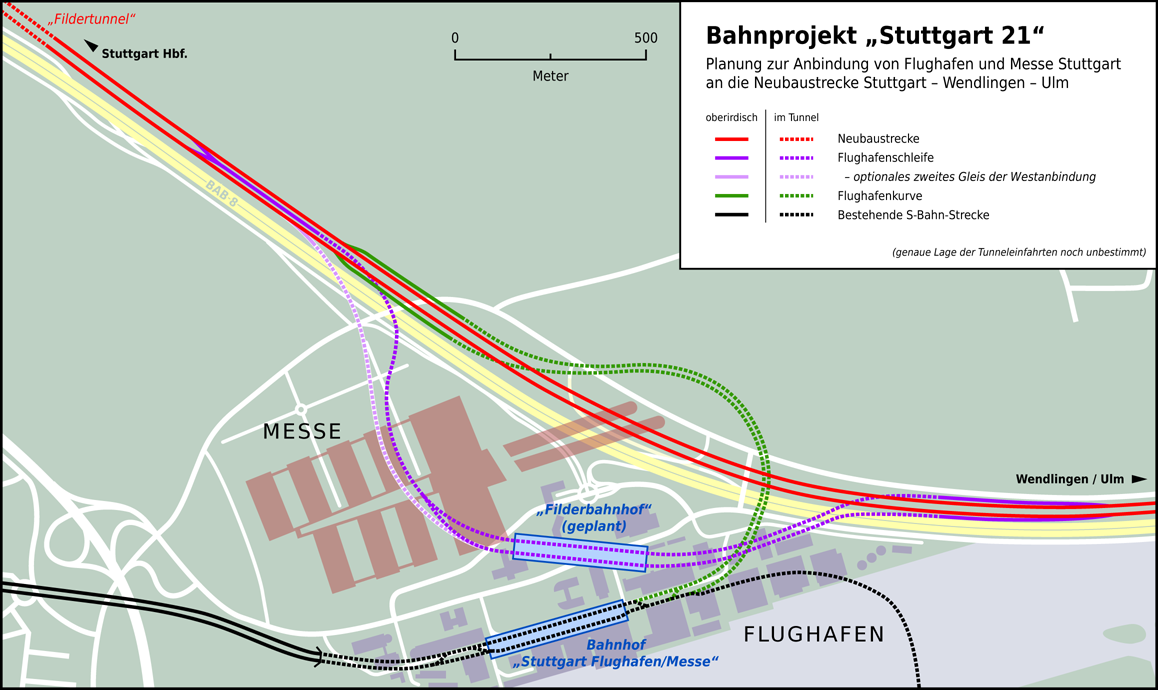
Stuttgart airport and fair grounds. Both the existing and a new station are to be connected with the Stuttgart–Wendlingen high-speed line (red).

The concept attempts to combine plans for high-speed links from Stuttgart to other cities with the improvement of local infrastructure and replacement of the current terminal station. The current 16-track station is to be replaced by an underground 8-track through station which is currently under construction.

The new tracks are planned to cross below ground at right angles to the northern end of the existing building. Parts of the historic Bonatzbau building, the platforms and approach tracks are to be demolished, and the land sold for urban development.

The plans include new surface and underground lines connecting the station in Stuttgart's enclosed central valley with existing lines. The Stuttgart–Wendlingen high-speed line running through a new tunnel, the Filder Tunnel, would connect the replacement Hauptbahnhof with a new Filder station (Filderbahnhof), serving the Airport, the Messe (trade fair) and the Filderstadt district. The line would then connect to the new Wendlingen-Ulm high-speed line, which was opened in late 2022. The carriage sidings would be moved to the area of Untertürkheim station to clear land for redevelopment.

On 2 April 2009, the Premier of Baden-Württemberg, Günther Oettinger, signed the finance agreement with the German Minister of Transport, Wolfgang Tiefensee and Deutsche Bahn board member Stefan Garber.

On 23 November 2009, it was announced that construction would commence in February 2010, on condition that the overall costs do not exceed €4.5 billion.

DB subsidiary DB ProjektBau has planned the project on behalf of DB Netze and DB Station & Service and is its promoter for the development approval process.

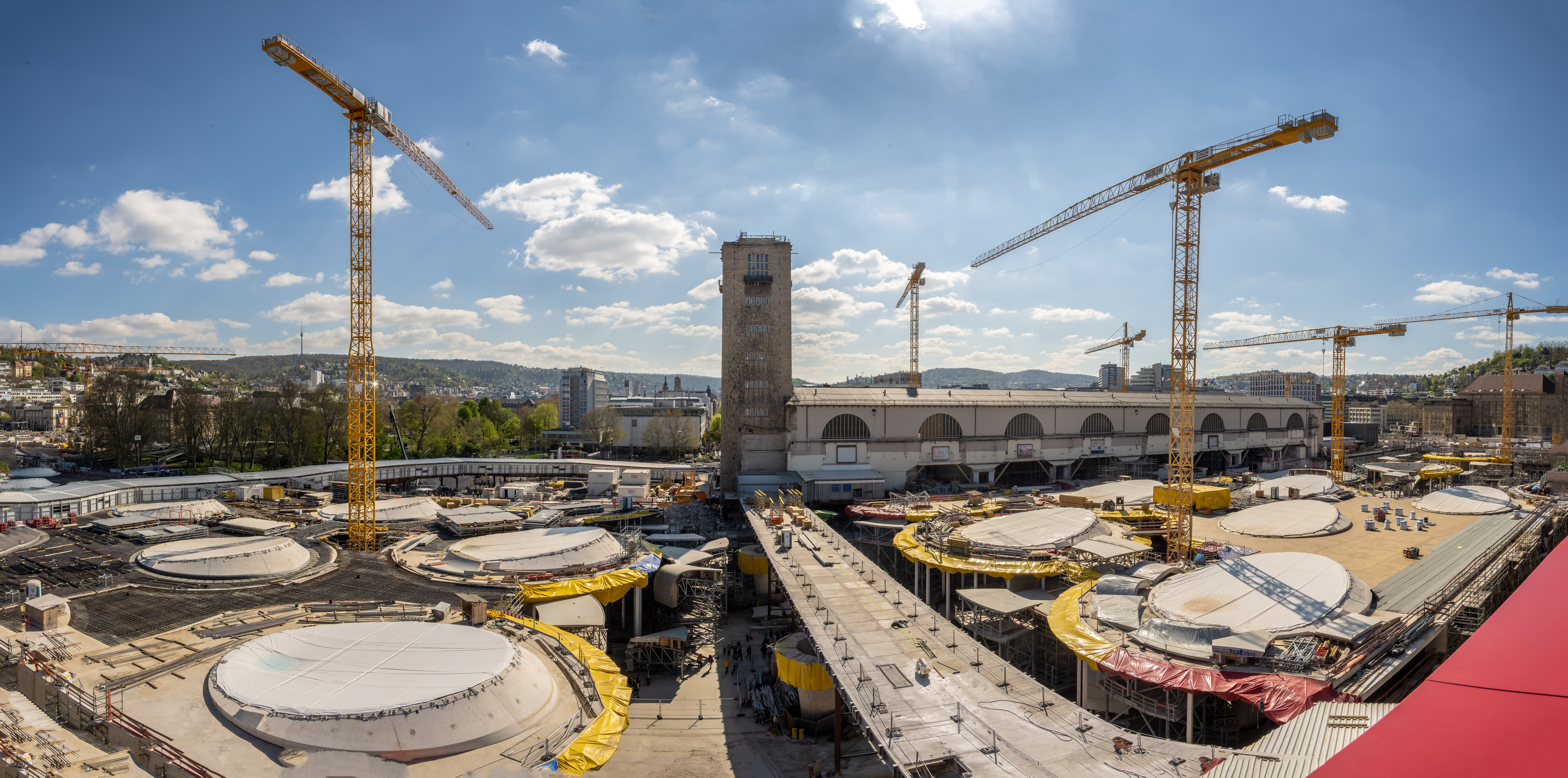
Construction site for the new underground station (April 2022)

== Debate and opposition ==
The Stuttgart 21 project has been a controversial issue among politicians and local people ever since the idea of a through station for long-distance trains – running under the existing station – was first proposed in the mid-1980s.

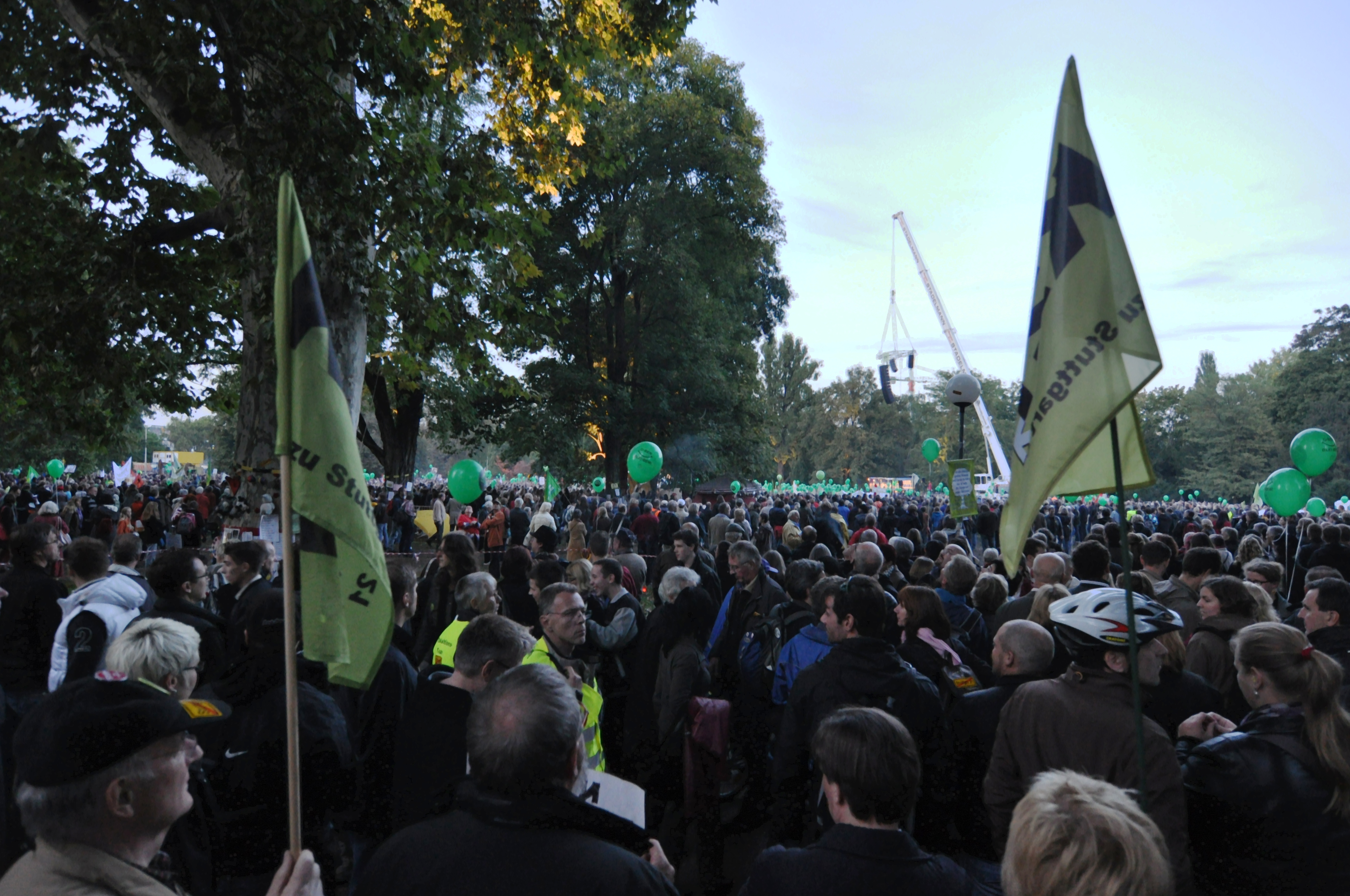
More than 50,000 people demonstrated against Stuttgart 21 on 1 October 2010.

Symbol of the protest against Stuttgart 21

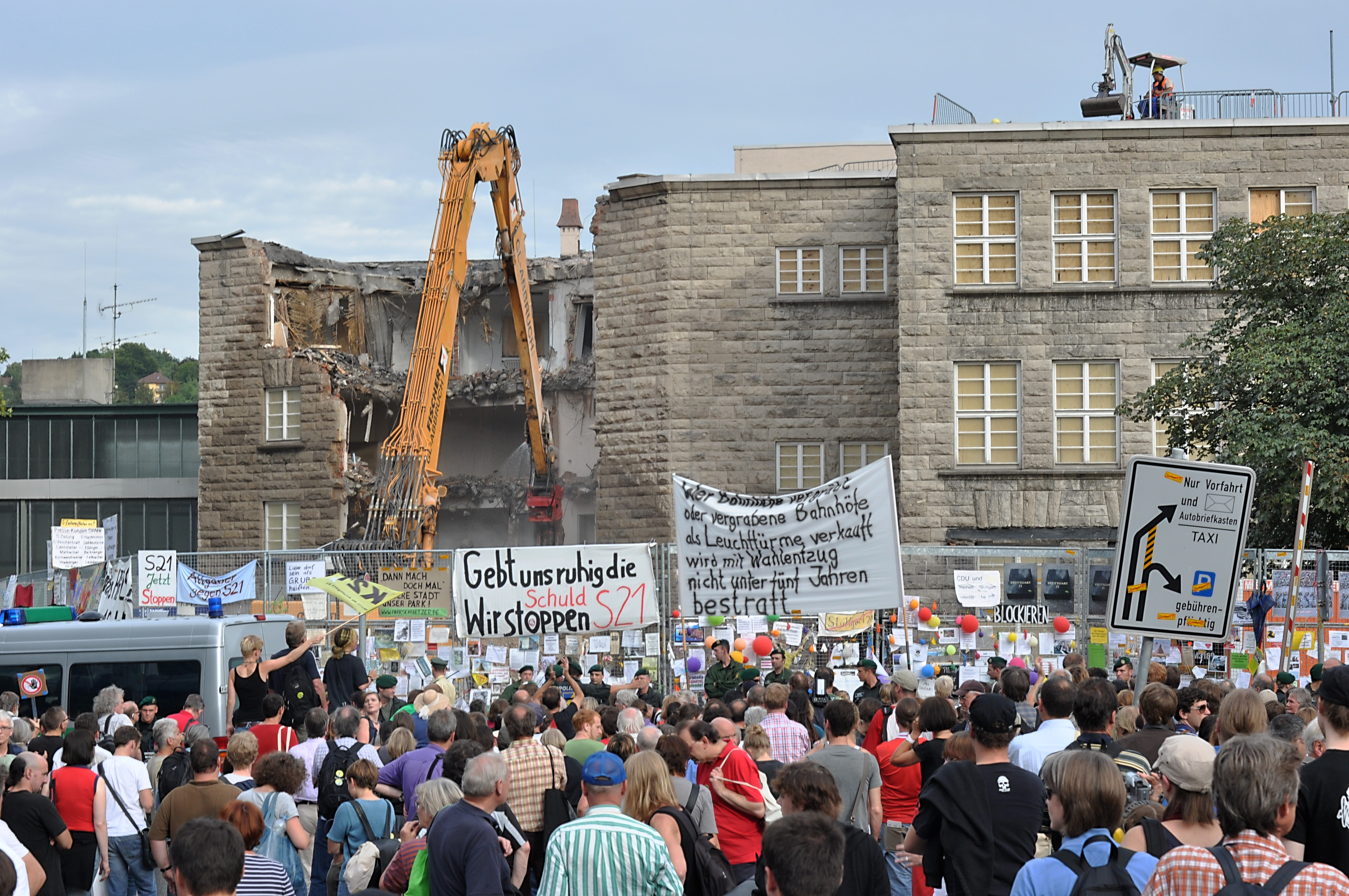
Demolition works and protest demonstration at the north wing of Stuttgart Hauptbahnhof, 26 August 2010

Since late 2006, there have been negotiations between DB, the Federal Government, the Baden-Württemberg Government and the city of Stuttgart over the sharing of the costs of the project. On 28 June 2007, a high-level conference was held and adjourned between DB chairman Hartmut Mehdorn, Baden-Württemberg Minister of Finance Gerhard Stratthaus and Stuttgart mayor Wolfgang Schuster. At the meeting, agreement could not be reached over the allocation of construction cost risks.

On 19 July 2007, it was announced by the Federal Government, the State of Baden-Württemberg and DB that the project had been approved. Identified funding sources are: DB (€1,115 million), the State of Baden-Württemberg (€685 million), and the Federal Government (€500 million). The agreement also made provision for possible increases over the €2.8 billion estimate of up to €1 billion, with Baden-Württemberg agreeing to fund up to €780 million and DB agreeing to fund up to €220 million. According to the statement, €2 billion would also be invested in the railway to Ulm, with the total budget amounting to €4.8 billion.

Shortly after the funding agreement was announced, the political opponents of Wolfgang Schuster were quick to condemn the Stuttgart mayor for backtracking on a promise made during the 2004 mayoral elections – namely that he would allow the population of Stuttgart to decide the fate of Stuttgart 21 if the additional costs of the project amounted to more than €200 million. On hearing the promise at the time, Alliance '90/The Greens candidate Boris Palmer withdrew his candidacy for the second round vote, recommending that his supporters should back Schuster instead.

In October 2007, a petition and public demonstrations were started, sponsored by private individuals with the backing of Alliance '90/The Greens and a variety of citizens' and environmental organisations. The aim was to collect 20,000 signatures and thus force politicians to take the issue to a local referendum. The petition gained 67,000 signatures but political wrangling began over whether the issue could be decided by a local referendum in the first place. Legal experts claimed that, as the project was not being financed solely from Stuttgart coffers, it was not for the city of Stuttgart to make the final decision.

On 11 October 2008, about 4,000 citizens of Stuttgart demonstrated against the demolition of the Hauptbahnhof's north wing. Since the fall of 2009, there have been weekly demonstrations on Monday evenings. On 1 October 2010, the biggest protest so far took place with an estimated 100,000 people taking part in the demonstration against the project.

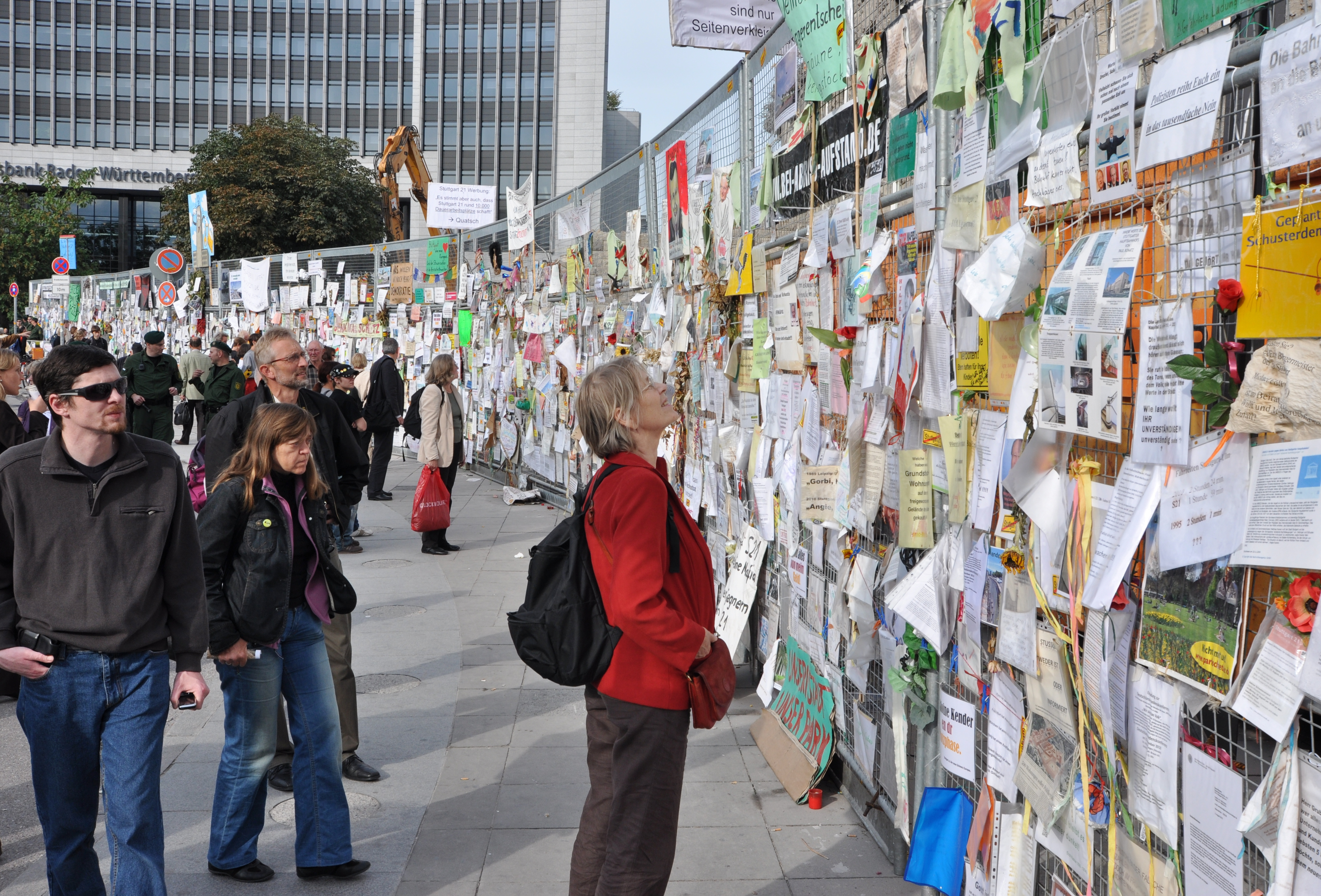
Protest manifestations on the fence during demolition works

The protests are organized by, among others, a grassroots initiative, Leben in Stuttgart (Life in Stuttgart), the local branch of The Greens and the environmental organisation Bund für Umwelt und Naturschutz Deutschland. They are suggesting a renovation of the current railway station, including creation of some new railways, but respecting the cultural heritage of the Hauptbahnhof terminus and the natural heritage of the adjacent Schlossgarten (Palace Park). The park (see Old Castle (Stuttgart) and New Castle (Stuttgart)) by Nikolaus Friedrich von Thouret, is part of a cherished green space that connects the inner city with the banks of the Neckar river. During the estimated construction time of at least 10 years, the project would cut off connections to other park areas of the city, known collectively as the Green U due to their U-shaped form. In November 2009, members of the International Council on Monuments and Sites stated that the Hauptbahnhof was a building of exceptional quality, whose integrity should be maintained.

=== "Black Thursday" ===
Since 2009 numerous protests against the disputed project had taken place. On 30 September 2010, hundreds of demonstrators were injured when the police used water cannon, pepper spray and batons against protestors. One citizen, Dietrich Wagner, permanently lost his eyesight. The event was widely referred to as "Black Thursday" in the media. The police chief of Stuttgart, who was present at the scene, was subsequently charged with, and convicted of battery.

The following day, more than 50,000 people took part in the biggest demonstration against the project so far.

Prior to that escalation, Frei Otto, one of the architects responsible for the project, cited a 2003 report for calling for a halt to the project, saying the ground in the area is too unstable for large scale underground works. Some critics suggest the cost of the project might rise to as high a figure as €18.7 billion.

== Referendum ==
Referendum on Stuttgart 21
- 27 November 2011
- Do you agree to the bill "Act on the Exercise of Termination Rights in Contractual Agreements for the Stuttgart 21 Railway Project (S 21 Termination Act)"?
- Outcome: Construction of Stuttgart 21 continues

Results
| Choice | Votes | % |
|---|---|---|
| Yes | 1,507,961 | 41.11% |
| No | 2,160,411 | 58.89% |
| Valid votes | 3,668,372 | 99.61% |
| Invalid or blank votes | 14,300 | 0.39% |
| Total votes | 3,682,672 | 100.00% |
| Registered voters/turnout | | 48.3% |

On 27 November 2011, a referendum was held to decide whether the state of Baden-Württemberg should cease funding for the project. 58.8 percent of the votes cast were against such a withdrawal. While some consider this proof that a majority is in favour of the project, others point out this might in parts be owed to questionable allegations which were floated before the referendum, e.g. that consequences of a withdrawal in the end might already be significantly more expensive than completing the project; as well as the fact that the wording might have been misleading for some voters (a 'yes' vote would have been in favour of pulling out of the project, and a 'no' in favour of its implementation) although the meaning of 'yes' or 'no' was explained on the ballot.

== Effects on politics ==
According to the German newspaper Die Welt, in June 2009 the Greens changed the balance of power in the city council as a direct result of disgruntlement with the controversial Stuttgart 21 rail project. The victory marked the Greens' first majority in a German city with more than 500,000 inhabitants. This meant an enormous loss for the CDU, who had held a majority of seats in Stuttgart continuously since 1972.

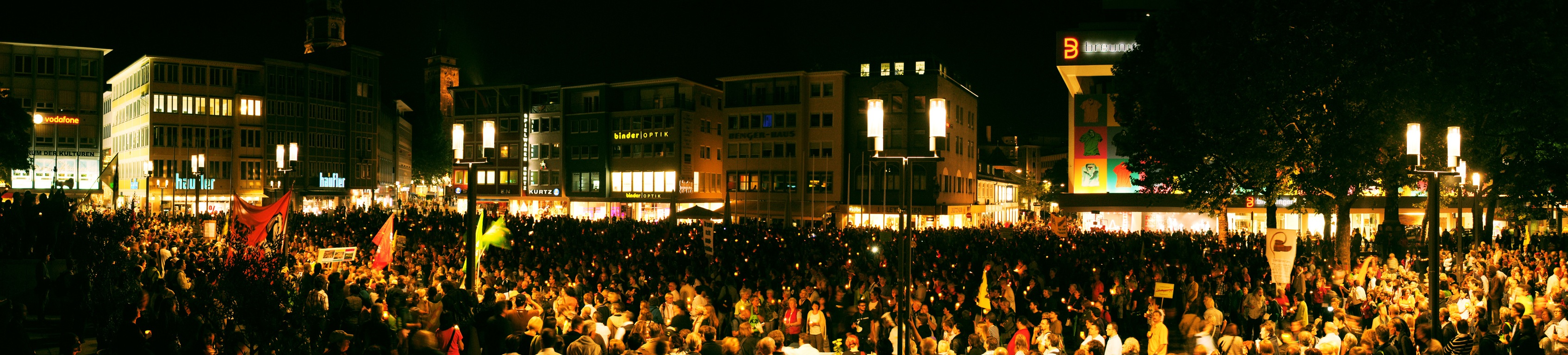
Stuttgart, 13 August 2010

The Stuttgart 21 project was a major issue in the state elections held in March 2011. While the CDU again won the largest number of seats in the Landtag of Baden-Württemberg, they and their FDP allies lost too many to maintain control. Instead, the Green party led a coalition government with the SPD. In the 2016 Baden-Württemberg state election, the Greens became the largest party and, in the 2021 Baden-Württemberg state election, won the most seats again.
