= Messe Stuttgart convention center =

Convention center in Stuttgart, Baden-Württemberg, Germany

Coordinates: 48°41′37″N 9°11′13″E

- Type: German limited (GmbH)
- Industry: Trade shows, exhibitions, conventions
- Founded: 1940
- Headquarters: Stuttgart, Germany
- Key people: Ulrich Kromer von Baerle
- Products: Convention centers
- Revenue: € 61 million (2006)
- Number of employees: 237 (2006)
- Website: www.messe-stuttgart.de

Messe Stuttgart is a convention center next to Stuttgart Airport, 12 km south of Stuttgart, Germany. It is the ninth-biggest convention center in Germany.

The new Messe Stuttgart site, completed in 2007, is right next to the A8 autobahn (highway). The center is accessible from Stuttgart Flughafen/Messe station on the local suburban railway network. Buses also travel to Messe Stuttgart from nearby Esslingen, Göppingen, Reutlingen and Tübingen. There are plans to link Messe Stuttgart and Stuttgart airport to the proposed Stuttgart–Wendlingen high-speed railway between Stuttgart and Ulm by 2019 as part of the Stuttgart 21 Project.

== Parking garage ==
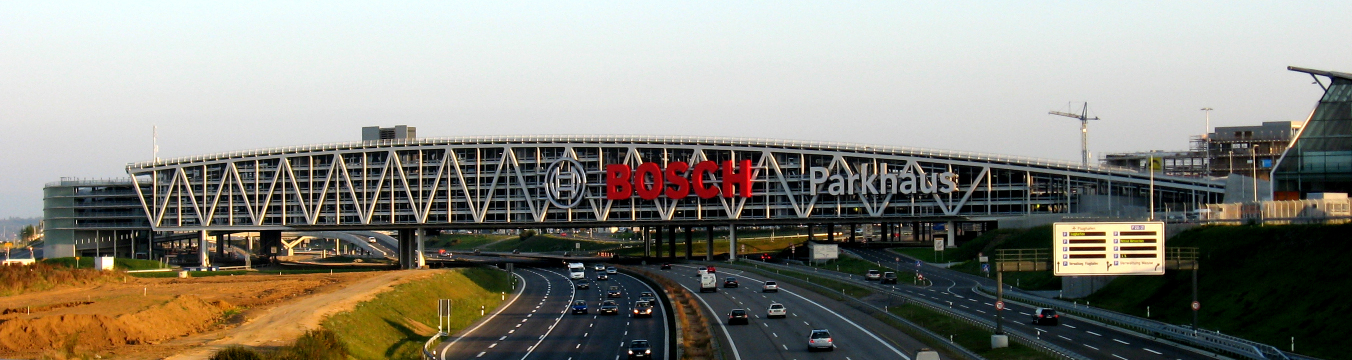
The parking garage in 2007

One of the most striking features of Messe Stuttgart is its huge parking garage, which spans the A8 Autobahn and can accommodate 4,200 vehicles on five levels. Display rights for the 4-ton logo on both sides of the garage's bridge were sold to Robert Bosch GmbH, which paid around 20 million euros for exclusive advertising space. The logo is the second-largest illuminated sign in the world and the biggest logo in the world after the unlit Hollywood Sign.

== Brief history ==
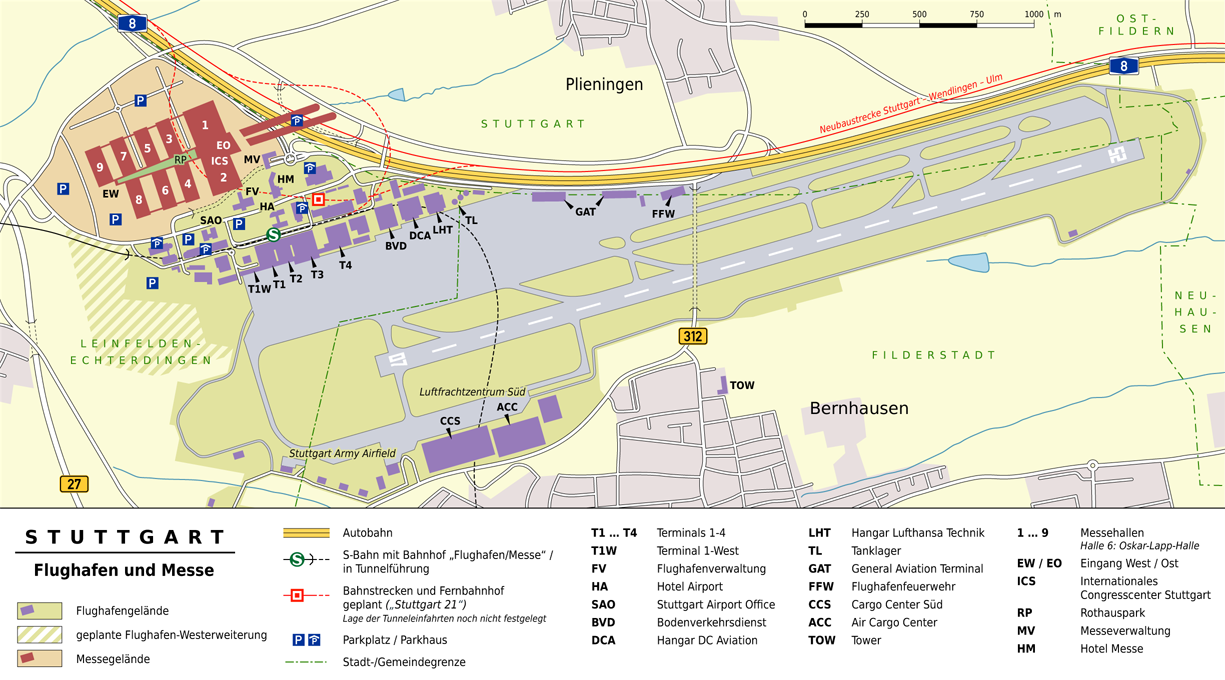
Messe Stuttgart convention center (dark red, in the upper left corner), next to Stuttgart airport

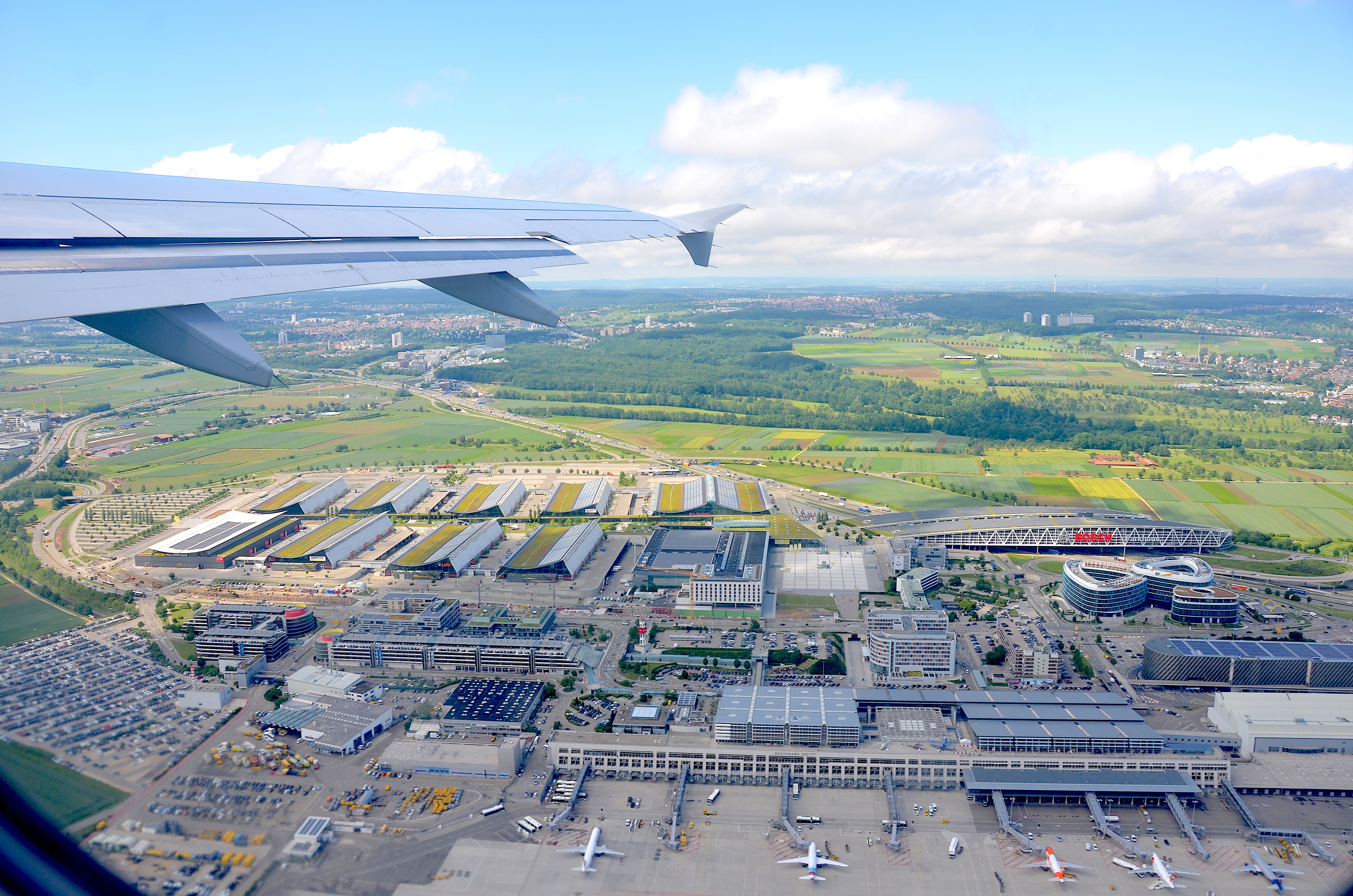
Mess Stuttgart convention center with Bosch parking garage at Stuttgart Airport (2019)

Before completion of the new site next to Stuttgart Airport, Messe Stuttgart had been based in the Killesberg suburb of Stuttgart for more than 50 years. As nearby housing estates encroached on the old site's parking and roads, it was closed down to make way for public housing for seniors and apartments.

== Criticism ==
Immediately after opening, Messe Stuttgart was plagued by a number of unexpected teething problems, ranging from faulty barcode readers at the entrances to poor signage.

Construction of the new site, originally approved in 1993, was subject to repeated delays. First, local farmers refused to sell their land after successful lobbying by nearby residents. After compulsory repossession of land was approved by the Baden-Württemberg State Government, demonstrations led to a string of court cases between landowners and the company hired to build the new center. An agreement was eventually reached between the local government and landowners amid cries from local residents that the farmers had "sold out" to politicians and had only gone along with lobbyists in the first place to maximize returns on the sale of land.
