= Bruchsal Rollenberg junction =

Coordinates: 49°08′50″N 8°37′12″E

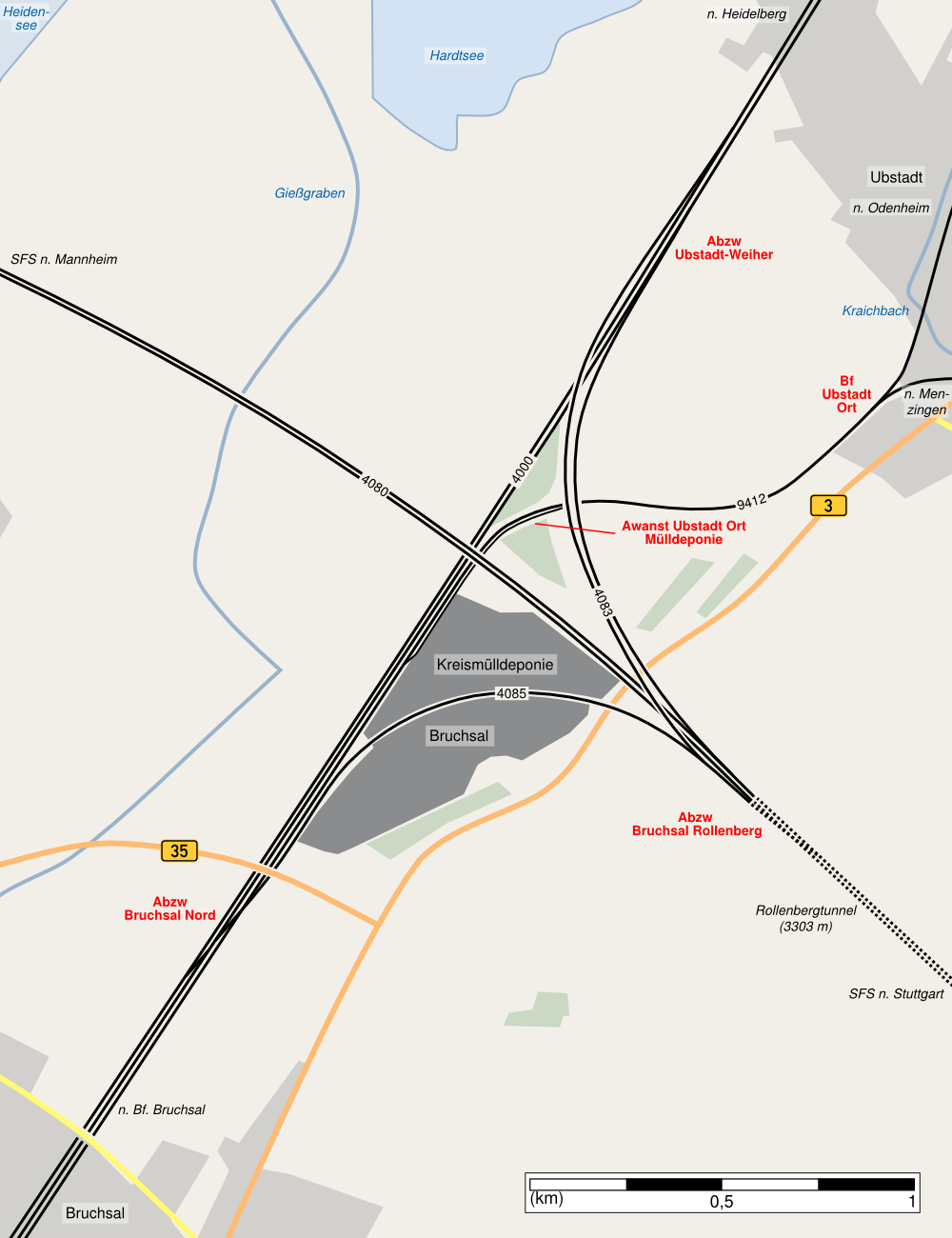
- Schematic representation of the links at Bruchsal Rollenberg junction

Overview
- Native name: Abzweigstelle Bruchsal Rollenberg
- Locale: Baden-Württemberg

Technical
- Number of tracks: 2 (continuous) (Grade separated junction)
- Track gauge: 1,435 mm (4 ft 8 1/2 in) standard gauge
- Electrification: 15 kV/16.7 Hz AC; Overhead catenary
- Operating speed: 160 km/h (99 mph) (maximum)

Ubstadt connecting curve

Overview
- Native name: Verbindungskurve Ubstadt
- Line number: 4083

Service
- Route number: 771

Technical
- Line length: 2.8 km (1.7 mi)

Bruchsal connecting curve
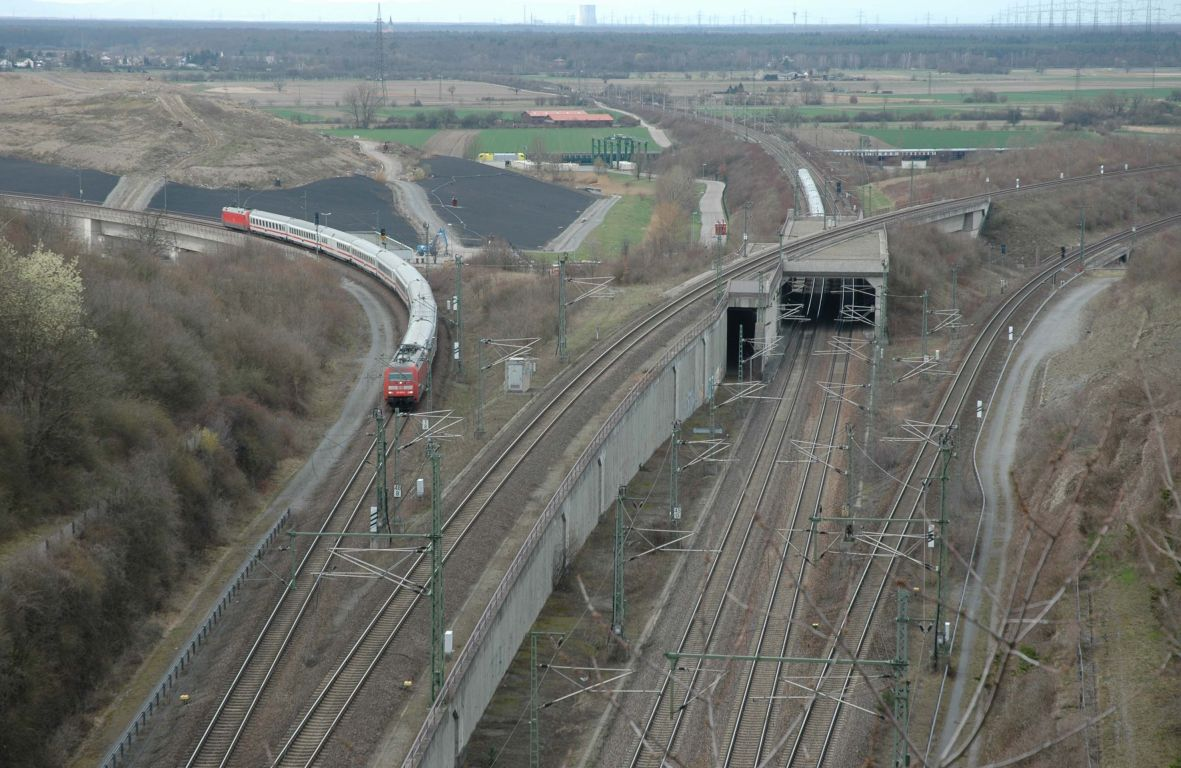
- A train running from Bruchsal towards Stuttgart on the Bruchsal curve (April 2006)

Overview
- Native name: Verbindungskurve Bruchsal
- Line number: 4085

Service
- Route number: 770

Technical
- Line length: 2.1 km (1.3 mi)

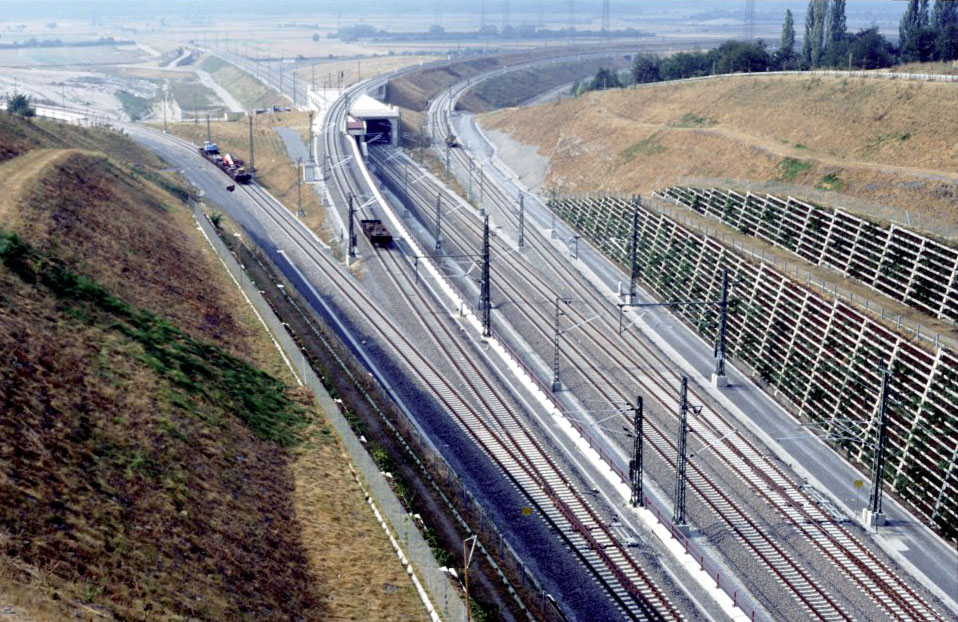
The junction before the opening of the line

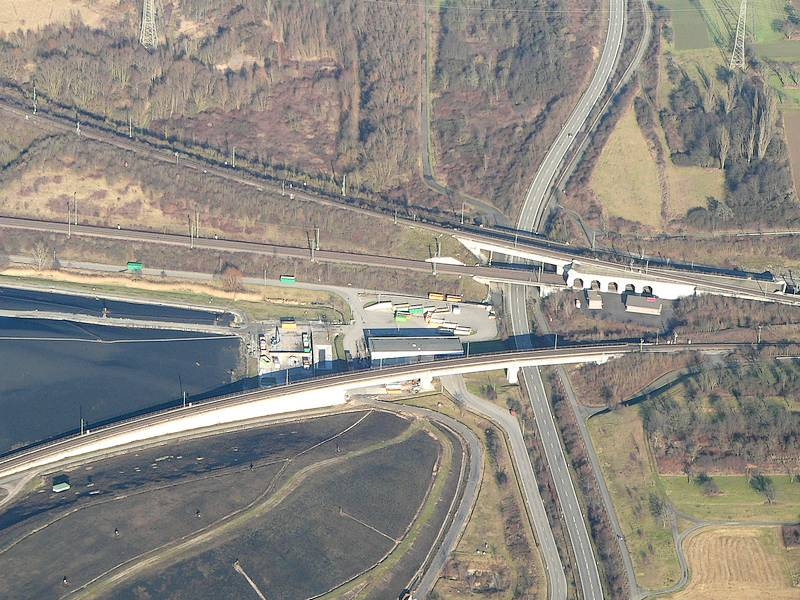
The two tracks on the above left run to or from Heidelberg, at the botthom left is the track to Bruchsal, in the middle is the high-speed line (January 2009)

Bruchsal Rollenberg junction is a complex flying junction at the intersection of Mannheim–Stuttgart high-speed railway with the Heidelberg–Karlsruhe line and is located between Bruchsal and Ubstadt in the German state of Baden-Württemberg.

The Ubstadt connecting curve (German: Verbindungskurve Ubstadt) branches off the line from Heidelberg in the northwest at Ubstadt-Weiher junction. The Bruchsal connecting curve (Verbindungskurve Bruchsal) branches off the line from Bruchsal and Karlsruhe in the southwest at Bruchsal Nord junction.

== Location and route ==
Bruchsal Rollenberg junction (Deutsche Bahn abbreviation: RROL) is located at the north west portal of Rollenberg Tunnel and thus where the Upper Rhine Plain meets the Kraichgau hills. The two-track high-speed line is connected to the three tracks of the Mannheim–Heidelberg–Karlsruhe line by the two tracks of the Ubstadt connecting curve from Mannheim and Heidelberg in the north and by the single-track of Bruchsal connecting curve from Karlsruhe in the south.

The two curves span an area of 50 hectares. In this area, there are parts of the now disused and sealed Bruchsal district landfill and the junction of the Bruchsal–Odenheim line with the Karlsruhe–Heidelberg line and the landfill siding.

=== Ubstadt connecting curve ===
The two tracks of the Ubstadt connecting curve separate at the grade-separated Ubstadt-Weiher junction (abbreviation: RUWA) from the Heidelberg–Karlsruhe line and run to the southeast. Trains on the southern track from Heidelberg run above the high-speed line before connecting with the track of the high-speed line that is used by trains running to the southeast. The northern track, which is designed for operations at 150 km/h, is used for trains running to Heidelberg. Both tracks connect with the track of a high-speed line that is appropriate to their direction of operation at the grade-separated Rollenberg junction.

The connecting curve also passes above the Bruchsal–Odenheim line, Federal Highway B 3 and district road 3585.

About 950,000 cubic meters of material were used for the line's embankment. It was extracted from the Rollenberg Tunnel and its approach cutting.

=== Bruchsal connecting curve ===
The single-track Bruchsal connecting curve runs from Bruchsal Nord junction (abbreviation: RBRR) northeast from the route from Karlsruhe and Bruchsal. South of the tracks of the high-speed line it connects with the southern track of the two tracks from Ubstadt curve.

The curve runs above the B 3 and crosses the tracks of the Bruchsal–Odenheim line at grade. It cuts the Bruchsal district landfill in half.

=== Bruchsal Rollenberg junction ===
At the northwest portal of the Rollenberg tunnels there are five tracks near the portal that join to form three tracks: the two tracks of high-speed line and the track lying to the south-west coming from Bruchsal and Heidelberg. Inside the tunnel the third track runs a short distance before connecting to the other tracks. This northwest portal of the Rollenberg Tunnel is the only railway tunnel portal in Germany with three tracks. With a cross section of 210 square metres, it is also has one of the largest cross-sections of tunnel portals on German high-speed lines.

== Planning and construction ==
=== Connecting curve Ubstadt ===
The Ubstadt connecting curve is passable at 160 km/h and was built between 1984 and 1988. It is up built on an embankment, which is up to 24 metres high and 180 metres wide, containing 950,000 cubic metres of earth, won from the Rollenberg Tunnel and its approach cutting. Construction costs were about DM 39 million (1986 prices), equivalent to about €20 million.

=== Connecting curve Bruchsal ===
The Bruchsal curve is single track, which is passable at 100 km/h curve, and was built after the Ubstadt curve. It was intended to serve regional and InterRegio traffic to and from the south-east. Another major purpose was the envisaged European high-speed link between Paris, Strasbourg, Munich and Vienna (the Magistrale for Europe).

After a 13-month planning inquiry completed in March 1988, the ground breaking ceremony for the curve was held on 30 September 1988.

A problem for its construction was that it was necessary to prevent the Bruchsal district landfill from penetrating the surrounding groundwater; in addition about 65,000 m^{3} of waste had to be moved. Various solutions were considered and it was eventually decided to build on an embankment with minimal disruption of the landfill, using materials that were resistant to damage from the landfill and resistant to settling. The project was put tender in January 1989. It cost about DM 16 million (about €8 million). Work began on 17 April 1989 and was completed on 31 July 1990.
