= High-speed rail in Germany =

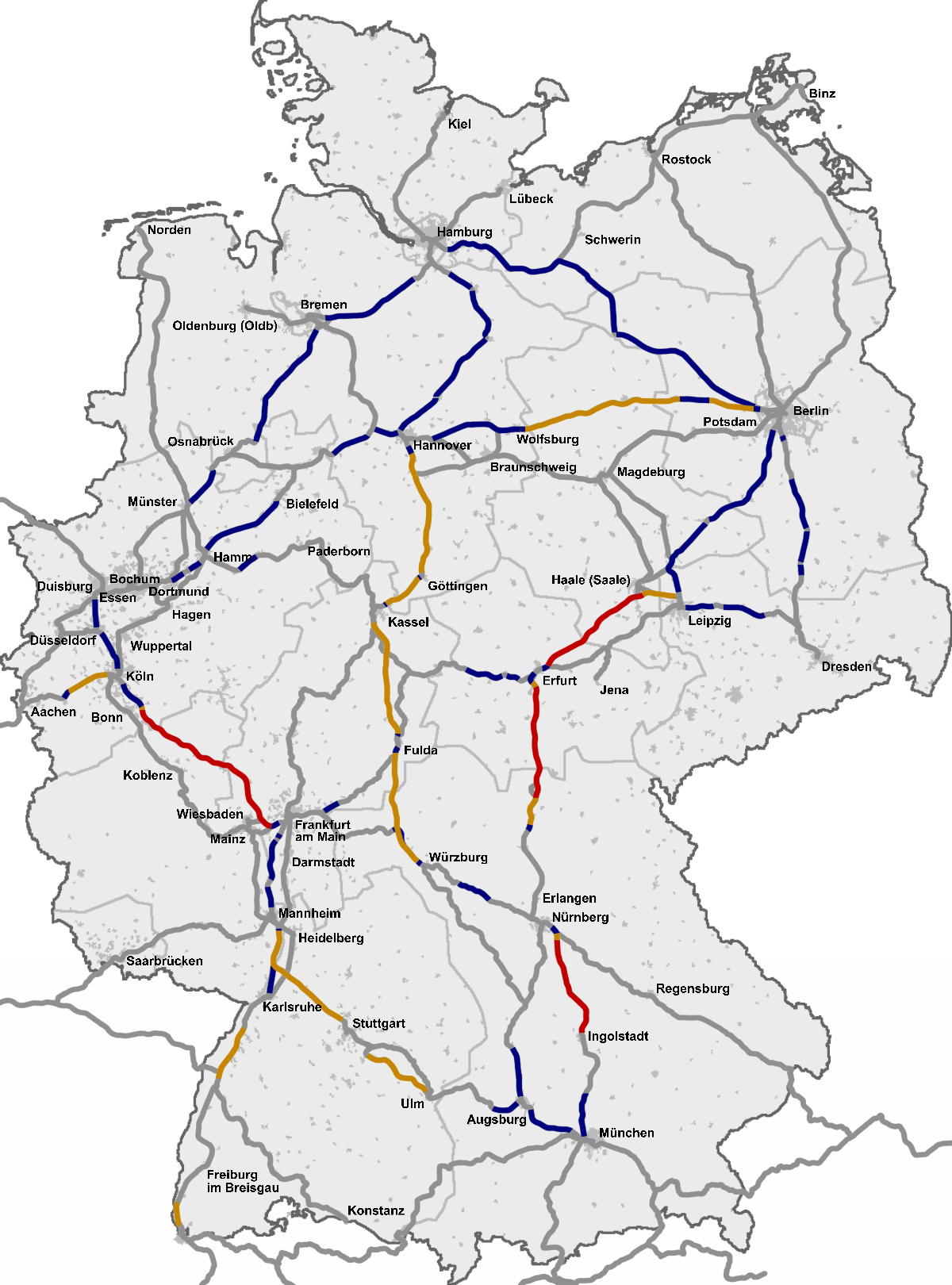
The InterCityExpress (ICE) network map in Germany (maximum speed limit): New lines, 300 km/h (186 mph) New and upgraded lines, 250–280 km/h (155–174 mph) Upgraded lines, 200–230 km/h (124–143 mph) Conventional lines (selected), 160 km/h (100 mph)

Construction of the first high-speed rail in Germany began shortly after that of the French LGVs (lignes à grande vitesse, high-speed lines). However, legal battles caused significant delays, so that the German Intercity-Express (ICE) trains were deployed ten years after the TGV network was established. Germany has around 1,658 kilometers (1,030 miles) of high speed lines.

== InterCityExpress ==
The first regularly scheduled ICE trains ran on 2 June 1991 from Hamburg-Altona via Hamburg Hbf – Hannover Hbf – Kassel-Wilhelmshöhe – Fulda – Frankfurt Hbf – Mannheim Hbf and Stuttgart Hbf toward München Hbf on the new ICE line 6. The ICE network is more tightly integrated with pre-existing lines and trains as a result of the different settlement structure in Germany, which has almost twice the population density of France. ICE trains reached destinations in Austria and Switzerland soon after they entered service, taking advantage of the same voltage used in these countries. Starting in 2000, multisystem third-generation ICE trains entered the Netherlands and Belgium. The third generation of the ICE has a service speed of 330 km/h (205 mph) and has reached speeds up to 363 km/h (226 mph).

Admission of ICE trains onto French LGVs was applied for in 2001, and trial runs completed in 2005. Since June 2007, ICEs service Paris from Frankfurt and Saarbrücken via the LGV Est.

Unlike the Shinkansen in Japan, Germany has experienced a fatal accident on a high-speed service. In the Eschede train disaster of 1998, a first generation ICE experienced catastrophic wheel failure while travelling at 200 km/h (124 mph) near Eschede, following complaints of excessive vibration. Of 287 passengers aboard, 101 people died and 88 were injured in the resulting derailment, which was made worse by the train colliding with a road bridge and causing it to collapse. The accident was the result of faulty wheel design and, following the crash, all ICE wheels of that design were redesigned and replaced.

== International operators ==
Thalys trains began running in Germany in 1997, from the Belgian HSL 3 to Aachen and Cologne using the Cologne–Aachen high-speed railway. TGV POS trains began running in Germany in 2007, to Karlsruhe and Stuttgart using the Mannheim–Stuttgart and Karlsruhe–Basel high-speed lines. Swiss SBB high-speed services using the New Pendolino from Frankfurt to Milan on the Karlsruhe–Basel line started in 2017.

== Transrapid ==
Germany has developed the Transrapid, a maglev train system. The Transrapid reaches speeds up to 550 km/h (342 mph). The Emsland test facility, with a total length of 31.5 km (19.6 mi), operated until 2011 when it was closed and in 2012 its demolition was approved. In China, Shanghai Maglev Train, a maglev based on Transrapid technology built in collaboration with Siemens has been operational since March 2004.

== List of high-speed lines ==
Line	Operating speed (max)	Length	Construction began	Construction completed or expected start of revenue services
Hanover–Würzburg high-speed railway	Normal: 250 km/h (155 mph); If delay (In tunnel also 250 km/h): 280 km/h (175 mph)	327 km (203 mi)	1973	1991
Mannheim–Stuttgart high-speed railway	Normal: 250 km/h (155 mph); If delay (In tunnel also 250 km/h): 280 km/h (175 mph)	99 km (62 mi)	1976	1991
Hanover–Berlin high-speed railway	Majority: 250 km/h (155 mph); Parts of the line: 300 km/h (186 mph) or 200 km/h (125 mph)	258 km (160 mi)	1992	1998
Cologne–Frankfurt high-speed rail line	Majority: 300 km/h (186 mph); Parts of the line: 200 km/h (125 mph)	180 km (112 mi)	1995	2002
Cologne–Aachen high-speed railway	250 km/h (155 mph)	70 km (43 mi)	1997	2002
Nuremberg–Munich high-speed railway	300 km/h (186 mph)	171 km (106 mi)	1998	2006–2013
Nuremberg–Erfurt high-speed railway	300 km/h (186 mph)	191 km (119 mi)	1996	2017
Erfurt–Leipzig/Halle high-speed railway	Majority: 300 km/h (186 mph); Parts of the line: 200 km/h (125 mph)	121 km (75 mi)	1987	2015
Karlsruhe–Basel high-speed railway	250 km/h (155 mph)	182 km (113 mi)	1987	1993–2031
Stuttgart–Wendlingen high-speed railway	250 km/h (155 mph)	25 km (16 mi)	2012	2026 (expected)
Wendlingen–Ulm high-speed railway	250 km/h (155 mph)	60 km (37 mi)	2012	2022
Total operational		1489 km (930.6 mi)		

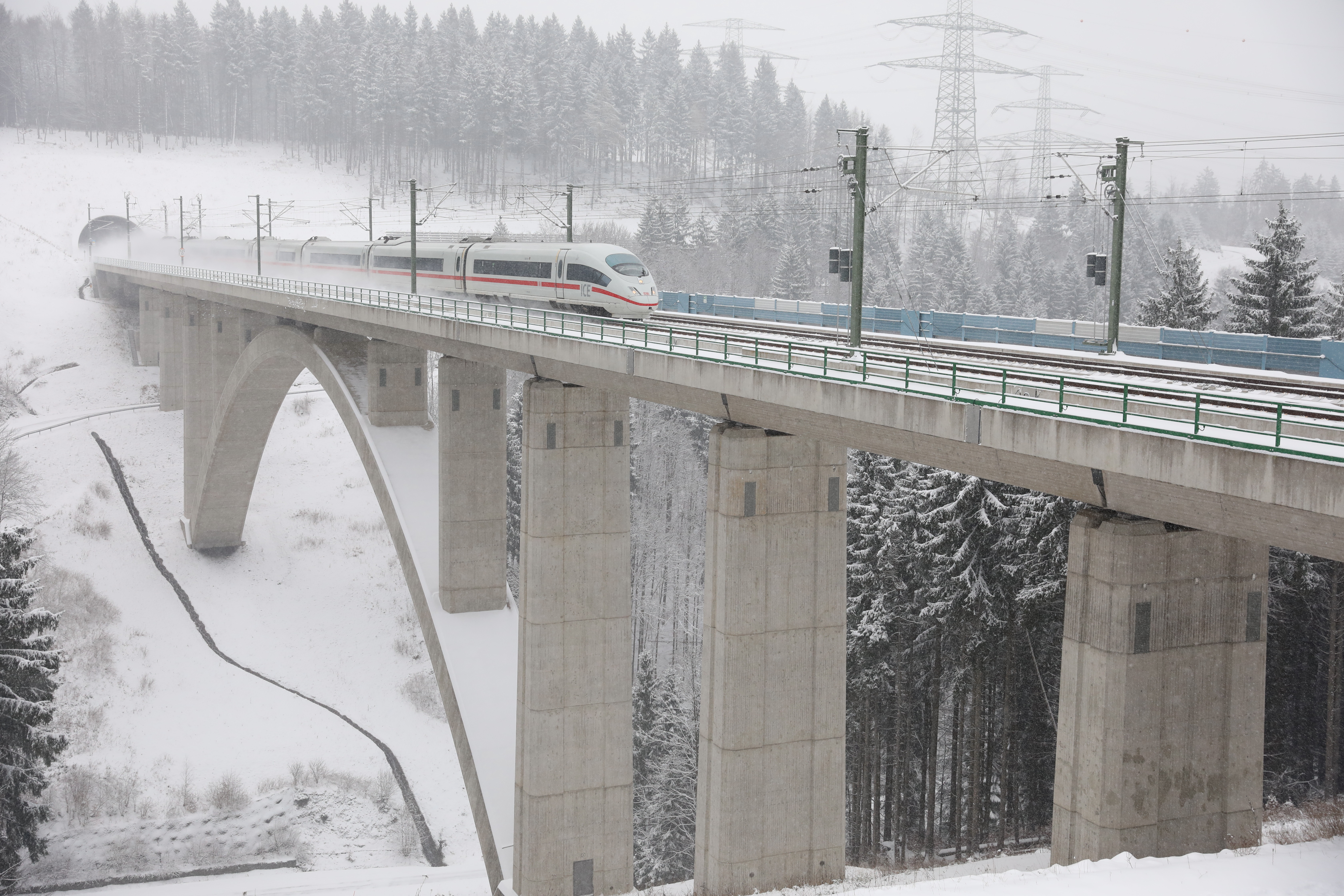
Third generation ICE running on the Nuremberg–Erfurt high-speed railway

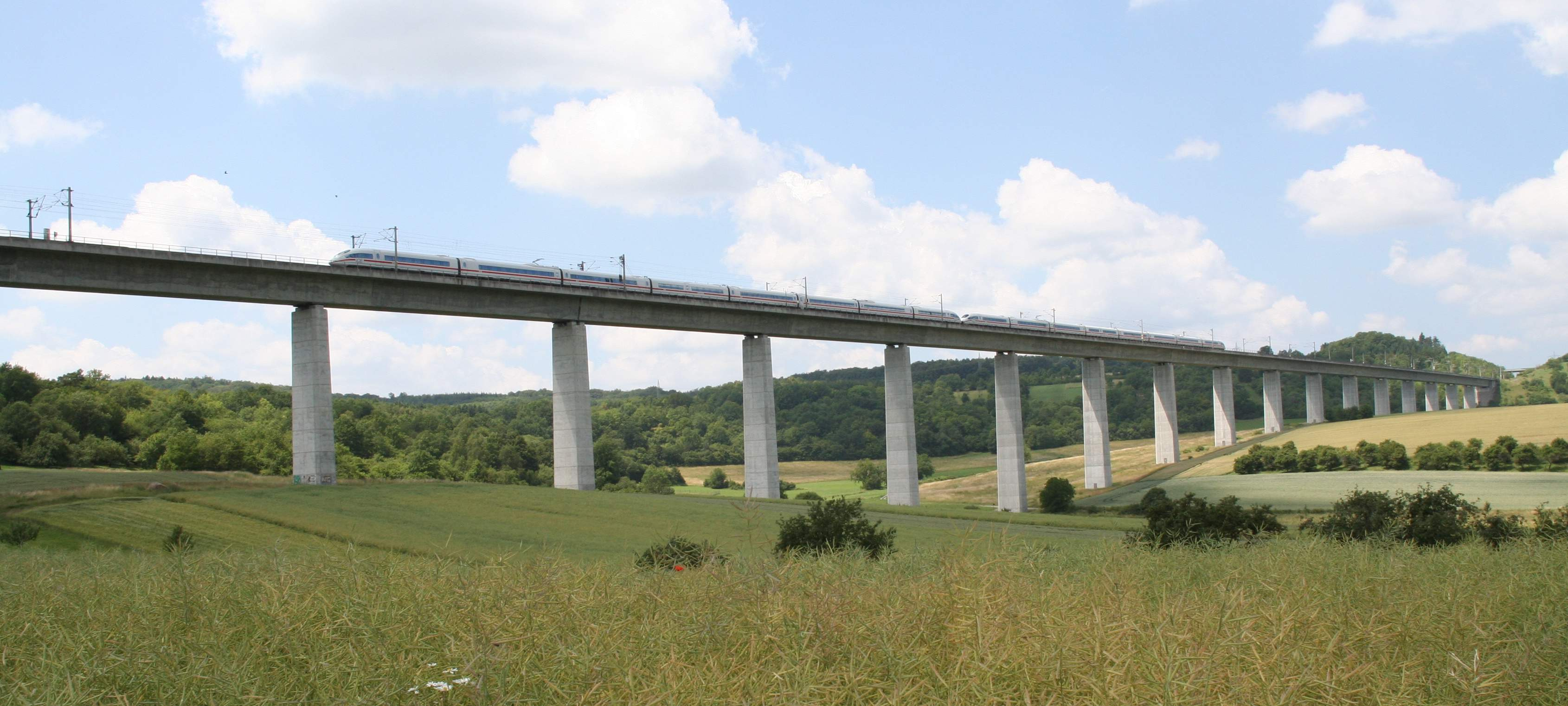
Bartelsgrabentalbrücke of the Hanover–Würzburg high-speed railway

=== Upgraded line ===
- Cologne–Aachen high-speed railway (upgraded line, 250 km/h)

=== Partially new line ===
Part of these routes are new constructions that run along or close to the existing, or previous, route:

- Hanover–Berlin high-speed railway (partially new line, 250 km/h on the new section, 160 and 200 km/h on the existing sections)
- Nuremberg–Erfurt high-speed railway (partially new line, 300 km/h)

=== Fully new line ===
Completely new construction projects:

- Cologne–Frankfurt high-speed rail line (new line, 300 km/h)
- Hanover–Würzburg high-speed railway (new line, 280 km/h)
- Mannheim–Stuttgart high-speed railway (new line, 280 km/h)
- Erfurt–Leipzig/Halle high-speed railway (new line, 300 km/h)
- Nuremberg-Ingolstadt high-speed railway (new line, 300 km/h)
- Wendlingen–Ulm high-speed railway (new line, 250 km/h)

=== Lines not yet completed ===
- Karlsruhe–Basel high-speed railway (new line, 250 km/h, incomplete, sections under construction)
- Stuttgart–Wendlingen high-speed railway (new line, 250 km/h, under construction)
- Vogelfluglinie (partially new line, partially being upgraded)
  - Lübeck–Hamburg railway (German part of Vogelfluglinie, to be upgraded to reach 200 km/h)
  - Lübeck–Puttgarden railway (German part of Vogelfluglinie, to be electrified to reach 200 km/h up from the current 160 km/h, under construction)
  - Fehmarn Belt Fixed Link (tunnel part, will replace the Rødby–Puttgarden ferry, 200 km/h, under construction, completion expected in 2028)
  - Sydbanen (Danish part, new tracks to be laid by 2021, to be electrified to reach 200 km/h by 2024, under construction)
  - Copenhagen–Ringsted Line (Danish part, opened on 31 May 2019, currently operating at 180 km/h, upgrading to 250 km/h in 2023)
- Hanau-Gelnhausen high-speed railway (upgraded line, 230 km/h, under construction)

=== Lines planned ===
- Frankfurt–Mannheim high-speed railway (new line, 300 km/h, in planning)
- Hanover-Bielefeld high-speed railway (new line, 300 km/h, in planning)
- Bielefeld-Hamm high-speed railway (upgraded line, 300 km/h, in planning)
- Nuremberg-Würzburg high-speed railway (new line, 300 km/h, in planning)
- Hanover-Hamburg high-speed railway/Hanover-Bremen high-speed railway (Y-shaped, partially new line, 160 and 300 km/h on new sections, 160 km/h on an existing section, in planning)
- Ulm-Augsburg high-speed railway (new line, 265 km/h, in planning)
- Gelnhausen-Fulda high-speed rail (new line, 250 km/h, in planning)

== Travel times ==
DB Intercity Express travel times between major stations^{1, 2}
	Amsterdam	Berlin	Brussels	Cologne	Dortmund	Düsseldorf	Frankfurt	Hamburg	Innsbruck	Munich	Paris	Stuttgart	Vienna	Zürich
Amsterdam Centraal		—N/a	—N/a	2h 37min	—N/a	2h 11min	3h 55min	—N/a	—N/a	—N/a	—N/a	—N/a	—N/a	—N/a
Berlin Hbf ^{4}	—N/a		—N/a	4h 12min	3h 25min	4h 14min	3h 52min^{3}	1h 42min	—N/a	3h 58min^{3}	8h 01min	5h 04min	7h 43min	—N/a
Brussels Midi/Zuid	—N/a	—N/a		1h 50min	—N/a	—N/a	3h 05min	—N/a	—N/a	—N/a	—N/a	—N/a	—N/a	—N/a
Cologne/Köln Hbf ^{4}	2h 37min	4h 17min	1h 50min		1h 10min	21min	1h 01min^{3}	3h 38min^{3}	—N/a	4h 32min	—N/a	2h 13min	8h 52min	—N/a
Dortmund Hbf	—N/a	3h 28min	—N/a	1h 17min		49min	2h 26min^{3}	2h 49min	11h 12min	5h 35min	—N/a	3h 29min	10h 07min	—N/a
Düsseldorf Hbf	2h 11min	4h 14min	—N/a	21min	48min		1h 26min	3h 06min	—N/a	4h 41min	—N/a	2h 28min	—N/a	—N/a
Frankfurt (Main) Hbf ^{4}	3h 55min	3h 39min^{3}	3h 05min	1h 04min^{3}	2h 35min	1h 26min		3h 20min^{3}	—N/a	3h 09min	3h 38min^{3}	1h 18min^{3}	6h 24min	3h 53min
Hamburg Hbf ^{4}	—N/a	1h 42min	—N/a	3h 35min^{3}	2h 47min	3h 06min	3h 20min^{3}		—N/a	5h 31min	—N/a	4h 59min	—N/a	7h 35min
Innsbruck Hbf	—N/a	7h 15min	—N/a	9h 48min	—N/a	10h 13min	5h28min	—N/a		1h 49min	—N/a	4h 03min	—N/a	—N/a
München Hbf	—N/a	3h 55min^{3}	—N/a	4h 32min	5h 28min	4h 44min	3h 09min	5h 31min	1h 44min^{5}		5h 34min	2h 12min	3h 56min	3h 32min^{5}
Paris Gare de l'Est	—N/a	8h 08min	—N/a	—N/a	—N/a	—N/a	3h 47min^{3}	—N/a	—N/a	5h 34min		3h 09min	—N/a	—N/a
Stuttgart Hbf	—N/a	5h 04min	—N/a	2h 13min	3h 25min	2h 28min	1h 17min^{3}	4h 59min	6h 17min	2h 12min	3h 09min		—N/a	—N/a
Vienna/Wien Hbf	—N/a	7h 40min	—N/a	8h 50min	10h 06min	—N/a	6h 21min	—N/a	—N/a	—N/a	—N/a	—N/a		—N/a
Zürich HB	—N/a	8h 39min	—N/a	—N/a	—N/a	—N/a	3h 53min	7h 35min	—N/a	3h 32min^{5}	—N/a	—N/a	—N/a	
^{1} German category 1 stations and comparable international destinations of 250.000 passengers per day or more^{2} only direct connections shown; travel times as of the DB 2018 timetable^{3} ICE Sprinter^{4} additional or alternative ICE stops for Berlin at: Berlin Südkreuz, Berlin-Gesundbrunnen, Berlin-Spandau and Berlin Ostbf for Cologne (Köln) at: Köln Messe/Deutz and Köln/Bonn Flughafen Fbf for Frankfurt at: Frankfurt (Main) Flughafen Fbf and Hamburg at: HH-Altona, HH Dammtor and HH-Harburg^{5} EuroCity-Express Service
