= Stuttgart–Wendlingen high-speed railway =

Overview
- Native name: Neubaustrecke Stuttgart–Wendlingen
- Line number: 4813
- Locale: Baden-Württemberg, Germany

Technical
- Line length: ≈25.2 km (15.7 mi)
- Num of tracks: 2
- Track gauge: 1,435 mm (4 ft 8 1/2 in) standard gauge
- Electrification: 15 kV/16.7 Hz AC overhead catenary
- Operating speed: 250 km/h (155 mph)
- Signalling: ETCS Level 2
- Maximum incline: 2.8%

The Stuttgart–Wendlingen high-speed railway is an under construction German high-speed line being built as part of the Stuttgart 21 project. It runs from Stuttgart Hauptbahnhof via the Filder Tunnel to the Filder plain and from there to the Neckar valley at Wendlingen, where it runs on to the Wendlingen–Ulm high-speed line. It is part of the Paris-Bratislava corridor as defined by the European Union.

The line will connect the new Filder station via the Airport Loop, and another line will connect to the existing airport station.

The design speed of the approximately 25.2 km line is mostly 250 km/h (155 mph). As of 2024, it is planned to enter in commercial service in December 2026 (two years delay compared to the expectation from 2017).

== Route ==
The line runs from Stuttgart station to the south through the 9,468-metre-long (31,063 ft) Filder Tunnel and surface southwest of Stuttgart-Plieningen near Stuttgart Airport and the A8 autobahn. It then runs to the east parallel with the A8 on its north side for about 10 kilometres to the Denkendorf service area. Between Denkendorf and Neuhausen the line runs under the A 8 in a 768 m-long (2,520 ft) Denkendorf Tunnel and then runs parallel with it on its south side to the southeast. On the western abutment of the Neckar Bridge at Wendlingen the line becomes the proposed Wendlingen–Ulm high-speed line.

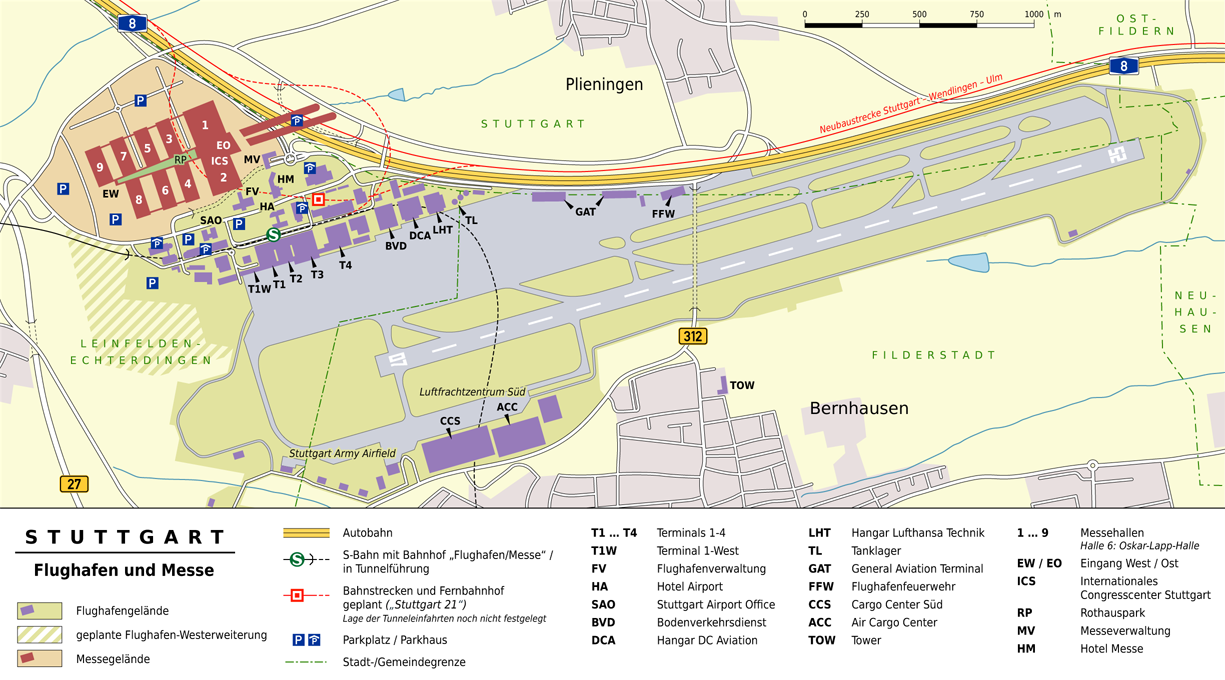
Airport and exhibition centre to Airport loop line, Airport curve and S-Bahn line

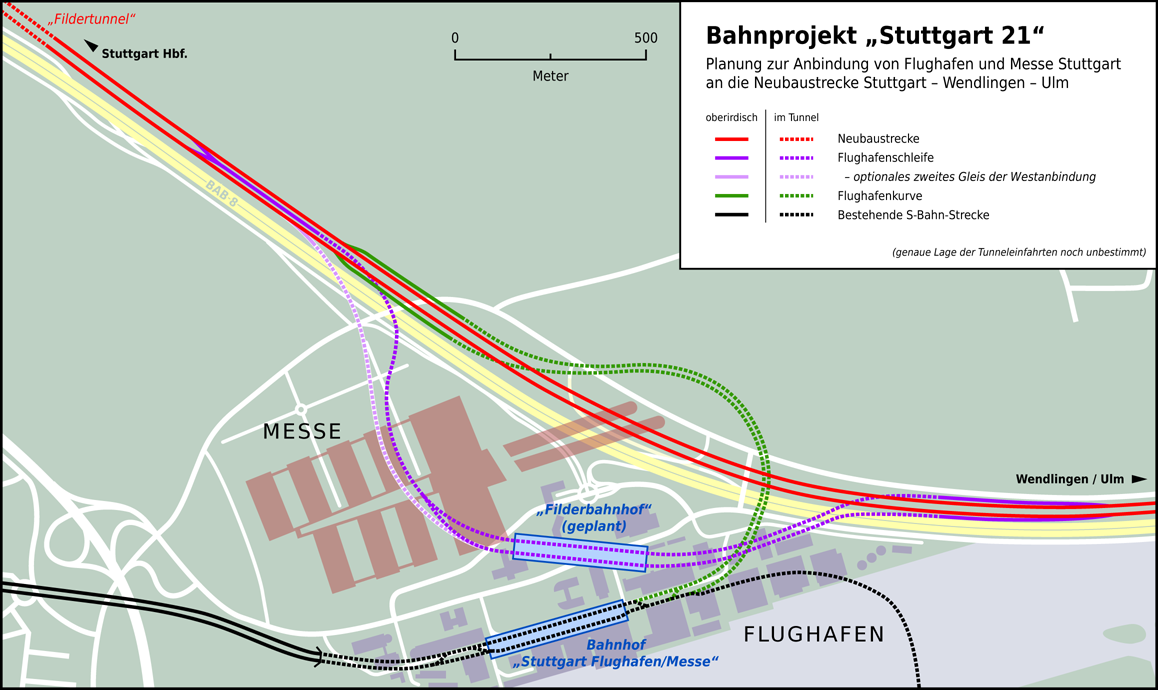
Schematic track plan in the airport area

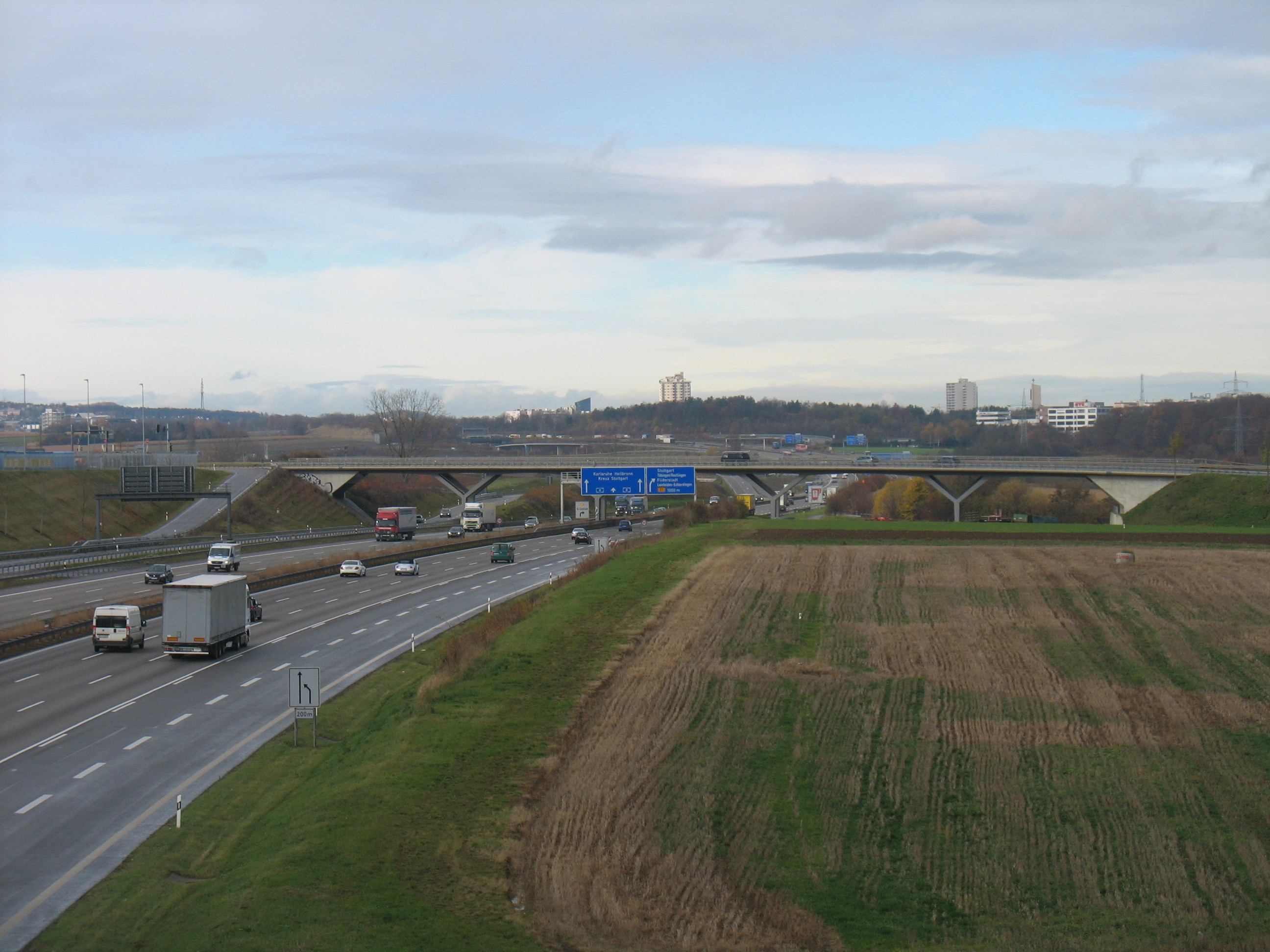
A8 north of Echterdingen looking west: here the new line runs parallel with the autobahn.

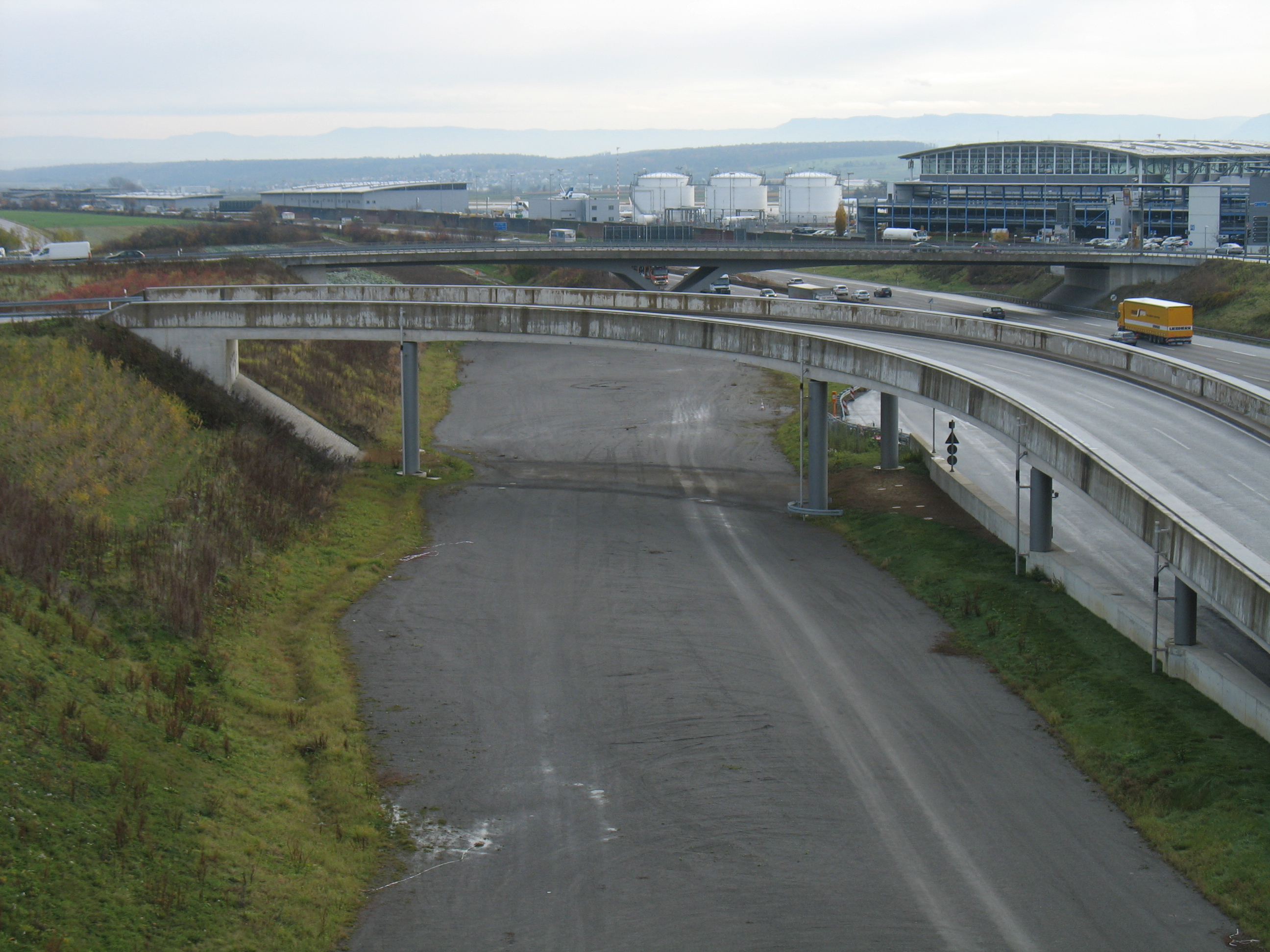
Prepared subgrade and overpasses near the Stuttgart Trade Fair.

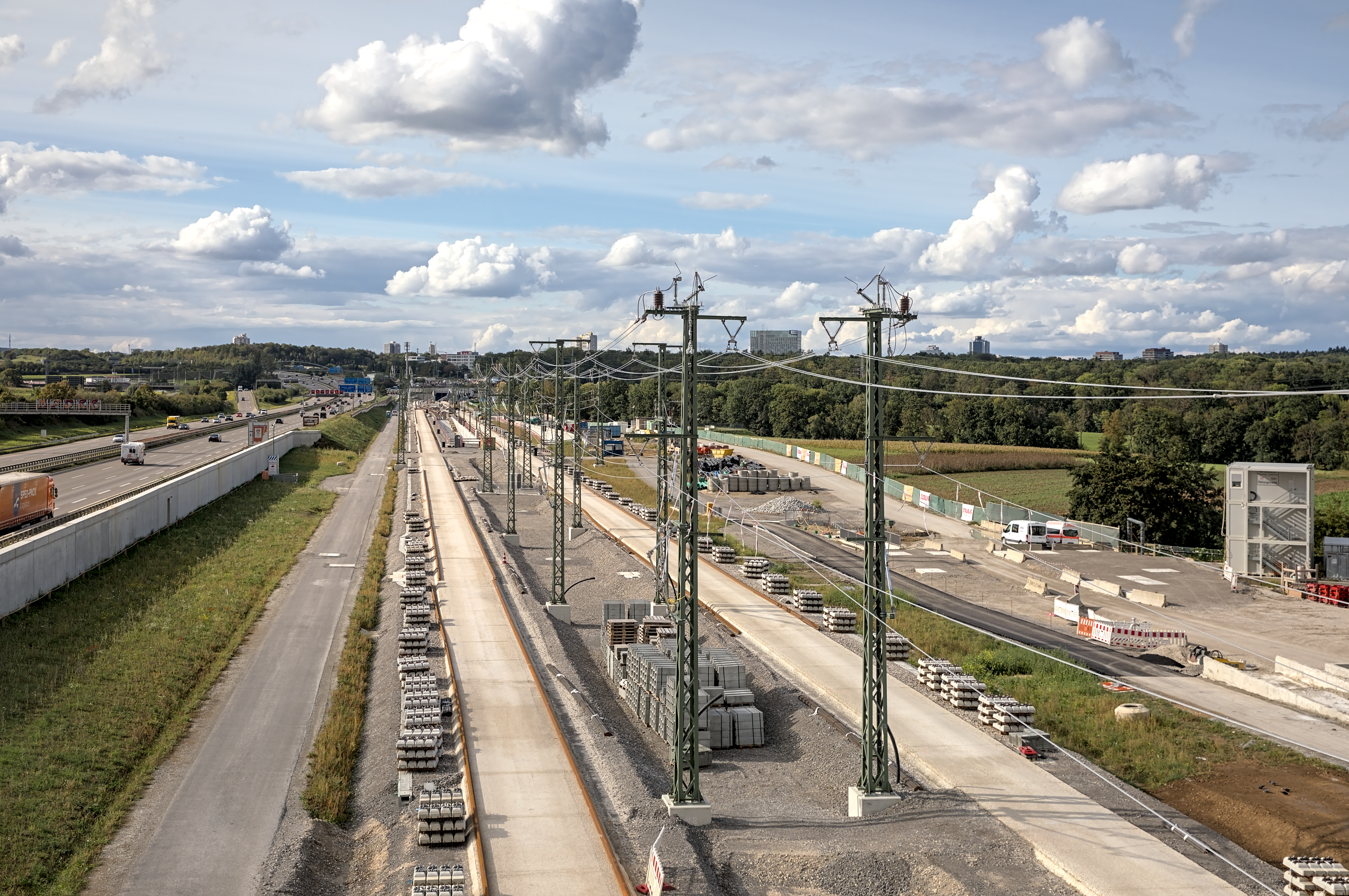
Exit of the Filder Tunnel with subsequent parallel location to the A8.
