= Wendlingen–Ulm high-speed railway =

Railway line in Germany

- Overview of the high-speed line

Overview
- Native name: Neubaustrecke Wendlingen–Ulm
- Line number: 4813
- Locale: Baden-Württemberg, Germany

Technical
- Line length: 59.575 km (37.018 mi)
- Num of tracks: 2
- Track gauge: 1,435 mm (4 ft 8 1/2 in) standard gauge
- Minimum radius: 2,305 m (7,562 ft)
- Electrification: 15 kV/16.7 Hz AC overhead catenary
- Operating speed: 250 km/h (155 mph)
- Signalling: ETCS Level 2
- Maximum incline: in Ulm Hbf: 3.5%; open line: 3.1% (exceptional); otherwise: 2.5%

The Wendlingen-Ulm high-speed line is a high-speed railway in Germany, entirely within the state of Baden-Württemberg. The line crosses the Swabian Jura mountain range, with trains traveling at speeds up to 250 km/h (155 mph). It mostly follows the A8 motorway, connecting with the Neu-Ulm station in the east and Stuttgart in the west. Stuttgart Hauptbahnhof is currently being redeveloped as part of the Stuttgart 21 project.

As a section of the Stuttgart–Augsburg new and upgraded line, the Wendlingen-Ulm line is a component of the Magistrale for Europe from Paris to Budapest, which is supported by the European Union as part of its Trans-European Networks. The European Union provided up to 50 per cent funding of the planning phase of the project and ten per cent of its construction costs.

== Line ==
The line cut travel time for high-speed traffic between Stuttgart and Ulm to 28 minutes rather than the previous 54 minutes, assuming no stop at Stuttgart Airport is made. The project was part of Deutsche Bahn's Netz 21 (network 21) concept, which envisages a reduction of the travel time between Frankfurt and Munich from over three and a half hours today to two and a half hours in the future. However, this timing can only be achieved with a by-pass of Mannheim on the proposed Rhine/Main–Rhine/Neckar high-speed rail line, which would allow the travel time between Frankfurt and Stuttgart to be reduced to one hour. Deutsche Bahn has shelved the proposed bypass because of opposition to it in Mannheim.

27.1 km of the 58 km line run in seven twin-tube tunnels. The estimated construction cost of € 2 billion, is affected by the difficult geology that the tunnels will run through.

=== Sections ===
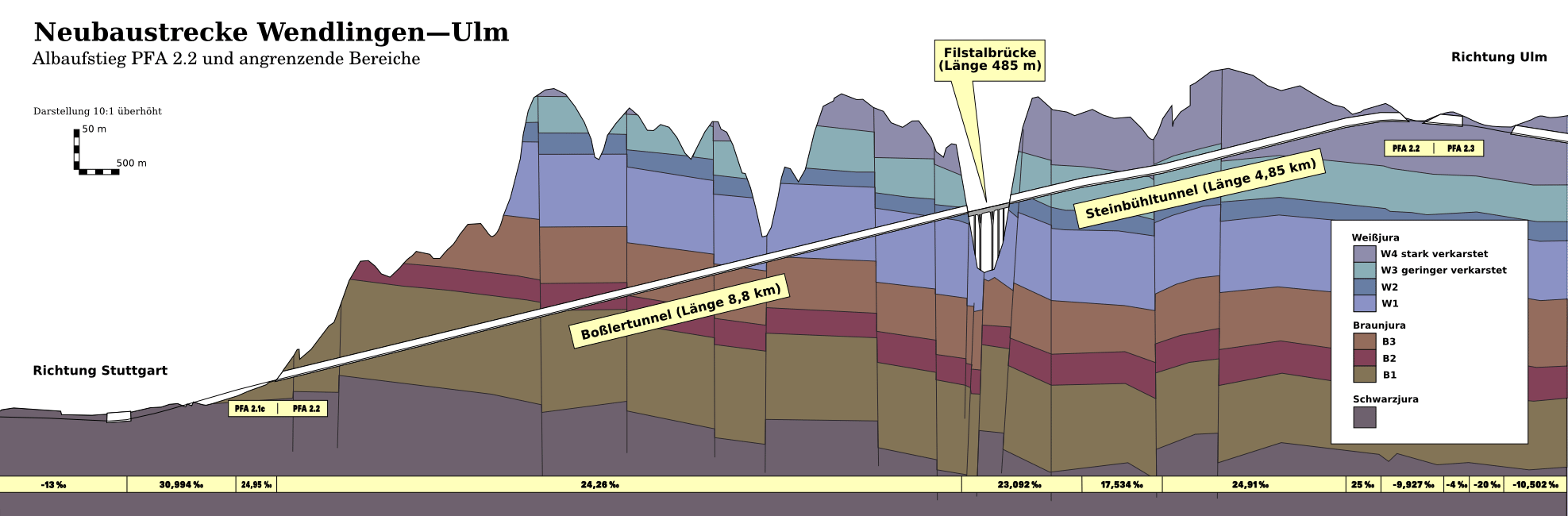
A cross section of the line's route, showing the geolocial layers through which tunnels were built

The project was divided into seven planning sections:

- Section 2.1 a/b connects Wendlingen with section 1.4 of the Stuttgart 21 project.
- Section 2.1 c (Albvorland: Alb foothills) runs parallel with the A8, including the 8.3 km-long Albvorland tunnel.
- Section 2.2 (Albaufstieg: Alb ascent) consists mainly of the approximately 8.8 km for the Bossler tunnel, two approximately 480 m-long bridges over the Fils valley and the approximately 4.8 km-long Steinbühl tunnel.
- Section 2.3 (Albhochfläche: Alb highlands) runs above ground and parallel to the A8.
- Section 2.4 (Albabstieg: Alb descent) runs through a tunnel into the city of Ulm.
- The integration of the line with Ulm station is carried out in Section 2.5 a1.
- Finally Section 2.5 a2 (Danube bridge) connects to the Neu-Ulm 21 project.

=== Construction timetable ===
Construction was initially planned to commence in 2005, but was pushed back due to budget cuts. This changed in 2007, when the Federal Government, the State of Baden-Württemberg and Deutsche Bahn announced that the project had been officially approved. €2.0 billion would be invested in the Wendlingen-Ulm high-speed line, along with €2.8 billion in Stuttgart 21. Baden-Württemberg agreed to provide funds of €950 million for the Wendlingen-Ulm line, but the Federal Government will not provide funding for it before 2016. Preparatory construction work for the new line began in the autumn of 2010, and the ground-breaking ceremony was held on 7 May 2012.

The line was officially opened on 9 December 2022, in an official ceremony with the head of Deutsche Bahn and several local politicians.
