= Nürtingen (Landtag electoral district) =

State electoral district of Germany

9: Nürtingen
- Electoral district for the Landtag of Baden-Württemberg
- Esslingen in 2026
- District: Esslingen
- Electorate: 125,076 (2026)
- Major settlements: Aichtal, Altdorf, Altenriet, Bempflingen, Beuren, Filderstadt, Frickenhausen, Großbettlingen, Kohlberg, Leinfelden-Echterdingen, Neckartailfingen, Neckartenzlingen, Neuffen, Nürtingen, and Schlaitdorf

Current electoral district
- Party: CDU
- Member: Maren Steege

Nürtingen is an electoral constituency (German: Wahlkreis) represented in the Landtag of Baden-Württemberg. Since 2026, it has elected one member via first-past-the-post voting. Voters cast a second vote under which additional seats are allocated proportionally state-wide. Under the constituency numbering system, it is designated as constituency 9. It is wholly within the district of Esslingen.

== Geography ==
The constituency includes the municipalities of Aichtal, Altdorf, Altenriet, Bempflingen, Beuren, Filderstadt, Frickenhausen, Großbettlingen, Kohlberg, Leinfelden-Echterdingen, Neckartailfingen, Neckartenzlingen, Neuffen, Nürtingen, and Schlaitdorf, within the district of Esslingen.

There were 125,076 eligible voters in 2026.

== Members ==
=== First mandate ===
Both prior to and since the electoral reforms for the 2026 election, the winner of the plurality of the vote (first-past-the-post) in every constituency won the first mandate.

Election	Member	Party	%
1976	Gerhard Mahler	CDU	
1980	Friedrich Volz	CDU	
1984	Friedrich Volz	CDU	
May 1988	Annemarie Hanke	CDU	
1988	Annemarie Hanke	CDU	
Feb 1992	Ulrich Stechele	CDU	
1992	Jörg Döpper	CDU	
1996	Jörg Döpper	CDU	
2001	Jörg Döpper	CDU	
2006	Jörg Döpper	CDU	41.1
2011	Thaddäus Kunzmann	CDU	39.7
2016	Winfried Kretschmann	Green	34.9
2021	Winfried Kretschmann	Green	38.8
2026	Maren Steege	CDU	33.7

=== Second mandate ===
Prior to the electoral reforms for the 2026 election, the seats in the state parliament were allocated proportionately amongst parties which received more than 5% of valid votes across the state. The seats that were won proportionally for parties that did not win as many first mandates as seats they were entitled to, were allocated to their candidates which received the highest proportion of the vote in their respective constituencies. This meant that following some elections, a constituency would have one or more members elected under a second mandate.

Prior to 2011, these second mandates were allocated to the party candidates who got the greatest number of votes, whilst from 2011-2021, these were allocated according to percentage share of the vote.

Election	Member	Party	Member	Party	Member	Party	Member	Party
1976	Werner Weinmann	SPD						
1980	Werner Weinmann	SPD	Winfried Kretschmann	Grüne				
1984	Werner Weinmann	SPD			Friedrich Bermann	FDP		
1988	Werner Weinmann	SPD	Winfried Kretschmann	Grüne				
1992	Werner Weinmann	SPD						
1996	Werner Weinmann	SPD	Winfried Kretschmann	Grüne	Friedrich Bermann	FDP	Egon Eigenthaler	REP
Feb 1997	Nils Schmid	SPD	Winfried Kretschmann	Grüne	Friedrich Bermann	FDP	Egon Eigenthaler	REP
2001	Nils Schmid	SPD	Winfried Kretschmann	Grüne	Friedrich Bermann	FDP		
2006	Nils Schmid	SPD	Winfried Kretschmann	Grüne				
2011			Winfried Kretschmann	Grüne				
2016								
2021					Dennis Birnstock	FDP		

== Election results ==
=== 2026 election ===
State election (2026): Nürtingen
Notes:	Blue background denotes the winner of the electorate vote. Pink background denotes a candidate elected from their party list. Yellow background denotes an electorate win by a list member, or other incumbent. A ✓ or ✗ denotes status of any incumbent, win or lose respectively.						
Party	Candidate	Votes	%	±%	Party votes	%	±%
CDU	Maren Steege	30,705	33.7	▲12.1	27,227	29.8	▲8.2
Greens	Clara Schweizer	25,409	27.9	▼10.9	29,751	32.6	▼6.2
AfD	Felix Schneider	16,546	18.2	▲9.1	15,795	17.3	▲8.2
SPD	Tim Reeth	6,818	7.5	▼1.7	4,523	5.0	▼4.3
FDP	Dennis Birnstock	6,288	6.9	▼4.7	4,898	5.4	▼6.2
Left	Clara Meier	3,866	4.2	▲1.6	3,245	3.6	▲1.0
FW					1,810	2.0	▼0.6
BSW					1,115	1.2	
APT					681	0.7	
Volt	Raphaël Fehlen	949	1.0		646	0.7	
PARTEI					372	0.4	▼1.0
Values	Matthias Rogge	452	0.5		312	0.3	
dieBasis					232	0.3	▼0.6
Bündnis C					191	0.2	
ÖDP					123	0.1	▼0.5
Pensioners					114	0.1	
Team Todenhöfer					107	0.1	
Verjüngungsforschung					73	0.1	
PdF					54	0.1	
KlimalisteBW					37	0.0	▼0.7
Humanists					31	0.0	
Informal votes		759			455		
Total valid votes		91,033			91,337		
Turnout		91,792	73.4	▲5.6			
CDU gain from Greens	Majority	5,296	5.8				

=== 2021 election ===
State election (2026): Nürtingen
Party	Candidate	Votes	%	±%
Greens	Winfried Kretschmann	32,562	38.8	▲3.9
CDU	Thaddäus Kunzmann	18,141	21.6	▼3.6
FDP	Dennis Birnstock	9,731	11.6	▲2.5
SPD	Regina Birner	7,749	9.2	▼1.3
AfD	Hansjörg Schrade	7,612	9.1	▼5.3
Left	Anil Besli	2,182	2.6	▲0.5
FW	Markus Mangold	2,186	2.6	
PARTEI	Daniel Friesch	1,162	1.4	▲0.7
dieBasis	Tansel Gündüz	727	0.9	
ÖDP	Michael Buchmann	569	0.7	Steady
KlimalisteBW	Lena Crnjac	627	0.7	
WiR2020	Sabine Mayer-Paris	428	0.5	
DiB	Kirstin Bürkle	310	0.4	
Majority		14,421	17.2	
Rejected ballots		511	0.6	▼0.2
Turnout		84,497	67.7	▼7.2
Registered electors		124,739		
Greens hold		Swing		

== See also ==
- Politics of Baden-Württemberg
- Landtag of Baden-Württemberg
