= Brühlbach =

Brühlbach is an often used name of streams in Southern Germany and Switzerland and may refer to:

- Brühlbach (Erms, Bad Urach), left hand tributary of the Erms at the downstream border of city Bad Urach
- Brühlbach (Erms, Metzingen), right hand Erms tributary in Metzingen

== See also ==
- Brohlbach (disambiguation)
- Buhlbach (disambiguation)
