= Altdorf, Esslingen =

Altdorf
- Municipality
- Coat of arms

- Location of Altdorf within Esslingen district
- Interactive map of Altdorf
- Location within Germany Location within Baden-Württemberg
- Coordinates: 48°35′39″N 9°16′15″E
- Country: Germany
- State: Baden-Württemberg
- Admin. region: Stuttgart
- District: Esslingen

Government
  - Mayor (2020–28): Joachim Kälberer

Area
  - Total: 3.24 km^{2} (1.25 sq mi)
- Elevation: 356 m (1,168 ft)

Population (2025-12-31)
  - Total: 1,704
  - Density: 526/km^{2} (1,360/sq mi)
- Time zone: UTC+01:00 (CET)
  - Summer (DST): UTC+02:00 (CEST)
- Postal codes: 72655
- Dialling codes: 07127
- Vehicle registration: ES
- Website: www.gemeinde-altdorf.de

Altdorf (German pronunciation: [ˈaltˌdɔʁf]) is a municipality in the district of Esslingen in Baden-Württemberg in southern Germany. It is 8 kilometres (5 miles) away from the town of Nürtingen.

== Geography ==
Altdorf lies two kilometres south of the river Neckar in the foothills of the Swabian Jura.

=== Neighbouring communities ===
Adjacent communities are Neckartailfingen to the north, Nürtingen to the Northeast, Großbettlingen to the east, Bempflingen to the south and Neckartenzlingen in the West. All located in the district of Esslingen.

== History ==
Altdorf was first mentioned in 1291. The name Altdorf probably derives from the Alemannic Allachdorf, what a settlement was then called. From various findings it can be concluded that people have resided in Altdorf for four thousand years.

=== Population statistics ===
The population figures are census results (¹) or official extensions of the State Statistical Office of Baden-Württemberg, only including Hauptwohnsitze (main domicile).

Year	Population
1871¹	381
1900¹	429
1925¹	413
1950¹	586

Year	Population
1961¹	533
1970¹	710
1980	746
1985	848

Year	Population
1990	1017
1995	1163
2000	1321
2005	1462

With around 1,500 inhabitants, Altdorf is the smallest Gemeinde (municipality) in the District of Esslingen.

== Politics ==
Altdorf belongs to the Gemeindeverwaltungsverband Neckartenzlingen.

=== Council ===
The council has 10 members in Altdorf. The local elections on 25 May 2014 gave the following distribution of seats:

Freie Bürgerliste Altdorf (Free Citizens of Altdorf)	52,7 %	6 Seats
Unabhängige Bürger (Independent Citizens)	47,3 %	4 Seats

The council consists of the elected honorary councilors and the mayor as chairman. The mayor is entitled to vote in the council.

=== Mayor ===
The independent Joachim Kälberer is mayor of Altdorf. He was elected for his first term of office with 90.3% of the vote in the 2004 mayoral election, which gained a 54.6% voter turnout. The first term ended in 2012, though on 29 January 2012 Joachim Kälberer was confirmed for a further eight years in office, following a 97.6% approval rate with a voter turnout of 49.9%.

=== Crest ===
Blazon : A black Hirschstange (literally 'deer post', and known as the symbol of Württemberg) on a golden chief, below which is a silver ploughshare on blue.

== Economy and facilities ==
=== Public Institutions ===
In 2008 the Altdorf municipality built a Kneipp therapy pool.

=== Education ===
Altdorf has its own primary school and a kindergarten . Two kinds of secondary school, a Realschule and a Gymnasium, are located in the neighbouring town Neckartenzlingen . Hauptschule secondary school pupils attend the school in the community Neckartailfingen .

== Notable people ==
- Heinrich Vollmer (1885–1961), one of Europe's most famous weapon designers, who developed the German submachine guns of the Second World War, MP38/MP40.
