= Bempflingen =

- Municipality
- Coat of arms

- Location of Bempflingen within Esslingen district
- Interactive map of Bempflingen
- Location within Germany Location within Baden-Württemberg
- Coordinates: 48°34′19″N 9°16′11″E
- Country: Germany
- State: Baden-Württemberg
- Admin. region: Stuttgart
- District: Esslingen

Government
  - Mayor (2017–25): Bernd Welser

Area
  - Total: 6.27 km^{2} (2.42 sq mi)
- Elevation: 336 m (1,102 ft)

Population (2025-12-31)
  - Total: 3,304
  - Density: 527/km^{2} (1,360/sq mi)
- Time zone: UTC+01:00 (CET)
  - Summer (DST): UTC+02:00 (CEST)
- Postal codes: 72658
- Dialling codes: 07123
- Vehicle registration: ES
- Website: www.bempflingen.de

Bempflingen is a municipality in the district Esslingen in the Erms valley in Baden-Württemberg, Germany. It belongs to the Region Stuttgart and the European Metropolitan Region Stuttgart.

== Geography ==
=== Geographical location ===
The municipal territory of Bempflingen covers a short section of the river valley of the Erms in the west and extends eastwards almost to the course of the Autmut river. The Eduard-Mörike-Hiking trail and the Ermstal fruit cycle path. South of the Reiner forest in direction Altdorf (Bempflinger Höhe) you can see the panorama of the Swabian Alb from the Hohenzollern over the Jusi to the three imperial mountains.

=== Neighboring communities ===
Adjoining communities are in turn Neckartenzlingen in the northwest, Altdorf in the north, Großbettlingen with a small settlement free exclave also in the north and with the main area in the northeast, all in district Esslingen; Grafenberg in the southeast, Riederich in the south as well as Reutlingen in the southwest, these in district Reutlingen.

=== Community Structure ===
Bempflingen consists of the two districts Bempflingen and Kleinbettlingen (Small bettlingen).

=== Area usage ===
According to data from Statistical State Office, status 2014.

== History ==
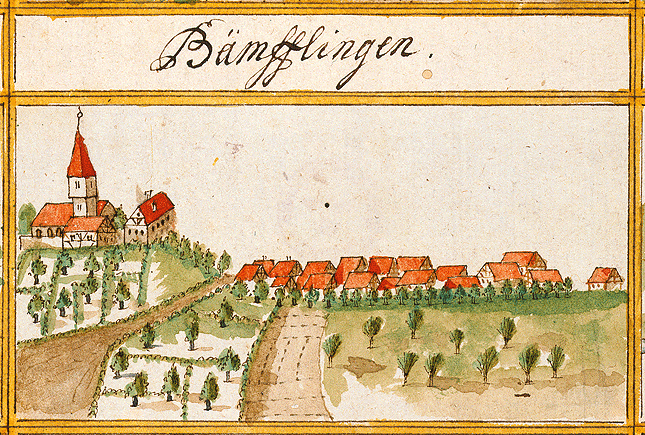

=== Bempflingen ===
Bempflingen was probably founded in the 5th century by Alemanni. This can also be concluded from the place name, which is probably connected with the first name Beonfil. At the place where the Alemannic row cemetery was found, a Roman manor house had previously stood.

Bempflingen was first mentioned in 1090, when the counts Kuno von Wülflingen and Liutold von Achalm and their nephew, count Werner von Grüningen signed the so-called Bempflinger Contract in Biemphelingin to settle the estate and especially to secure their foundation for Zwiefalten Monastery. At that time Bempflingen still belonged to the county Achalm.

Since the early 14th century the settlement belonged to the Kaib family. Later the village was sold and inherited by the Lords of Baustetten and the Lords of Mansberg. In 1448 Württemberg acquired the Baustettischen and in 1465 also the Mansberg part of the village. In 1639 Bempflingen and the Pfandschaft Achalm came under Austrian rule for ten years, but with the Peace of Westphalia came back to Württemberg. After the administrative reorganization at the beginning of the 19th century Bempflingen came to the Oberamt Urach, later to the Landkreis Nürtingen. The administrative reorganization of 1973 led to the affiliation to the administrative district Esslingen.

=== Religions ===
Bempflingen is since the Reformation protestant. But there is also a small catholic parish. The today's evangelical parish Bempflingen comprises the main village and the suburb Kleinbettlingen and belongs to the church district Bad Urach-Münsingen of the evangelical regional church in Württemberg.

=== Population development ===
Year	Population
1602	326
1. Dezember 1871	985
1. Dezember 1900	1.032
17. Mai 1939	1.233
13. September 1950	1.865
6. Juni 1961	2.184
27. Mai 1970	2.657
25. Mai 1987	3.100
31. Dezember 1995	3.146
31. Dezember 2000	3.220
31. Dezember 2005	3.363
31. Dezember 2010	3.348
31. Dezember 2015	3.474

== Politics ==
=== Mayors ===
- 1875–1909: Christian Seybold
- 1909–1927: Gottlob Doster
- 1927–1946: Otto Helber
- 1946: Gotthilf Hahn (Amtsverweser)
- 1946: Friedrich Frank (Amtsverweser)
- 1946–1966: Erwin Albrecht Reich
- 1966–1994: Helmut Kölle
- 1994–2010: Berndt Heidrich
- since February 2010: Bernd Welser

In the mayoral election on 8 November 2009, Bernd Welser was elected in the first ballot with 87.72% as successor to the incumbent mayor. The voter turnout was 66.29%.

=== City council ===
In Bempflingen the local council is elected according to the procedure of the false partial place election. Thereby the number of local councils can change due to overhanging mandatee. The local council in Bempflingen has 14 members after the last election (2014: 15). The municipal elections on 26 May 2019 led to the following final result. The local council consists of the elected honorary local councillors and the mayor as chairman. The mayor is entitled to vote in the municipal council.

Parties and electoral communities		% 2019	Seats; 2019	% 2014	Seats; 2014
FWV	Freie Wählervereinigung Bempflingen	50,24	7	50,03	7
SPD/UB	Sozialdemokratische Partei Deutschlands/Unabhängige Bürger	36,00	5	44,15	7
Bürgerliste	Bürgerliste Bempflingen	13,76	2	5,82	1
total		100,0	14	100,0	15
Voter participation		62,3 %		54,5 %	

=== Crest ===
Blazoning: Under a double row of silver (white) and black chased shield head in blue a silver (white) diagonal bar, covered with three red arrowheads.

The coat of arms, with the blue shield and the silver slanting beam covered with three red arrowheads, refers to the former lords of the village, the lords of Baustetten, who owned three quarters of the village in the 15th century. The lords of Mannsberg, who also owned Bempflingen, are represented by the checkerboard pattern in the coat of arms.

The municipal flag has the colours red and white (red and silver). Flag and coat of arms were awarded to the municipality by the Ministry of the Interior in 1957.

== Economy and Infrastructure ==
=== Traffic ===
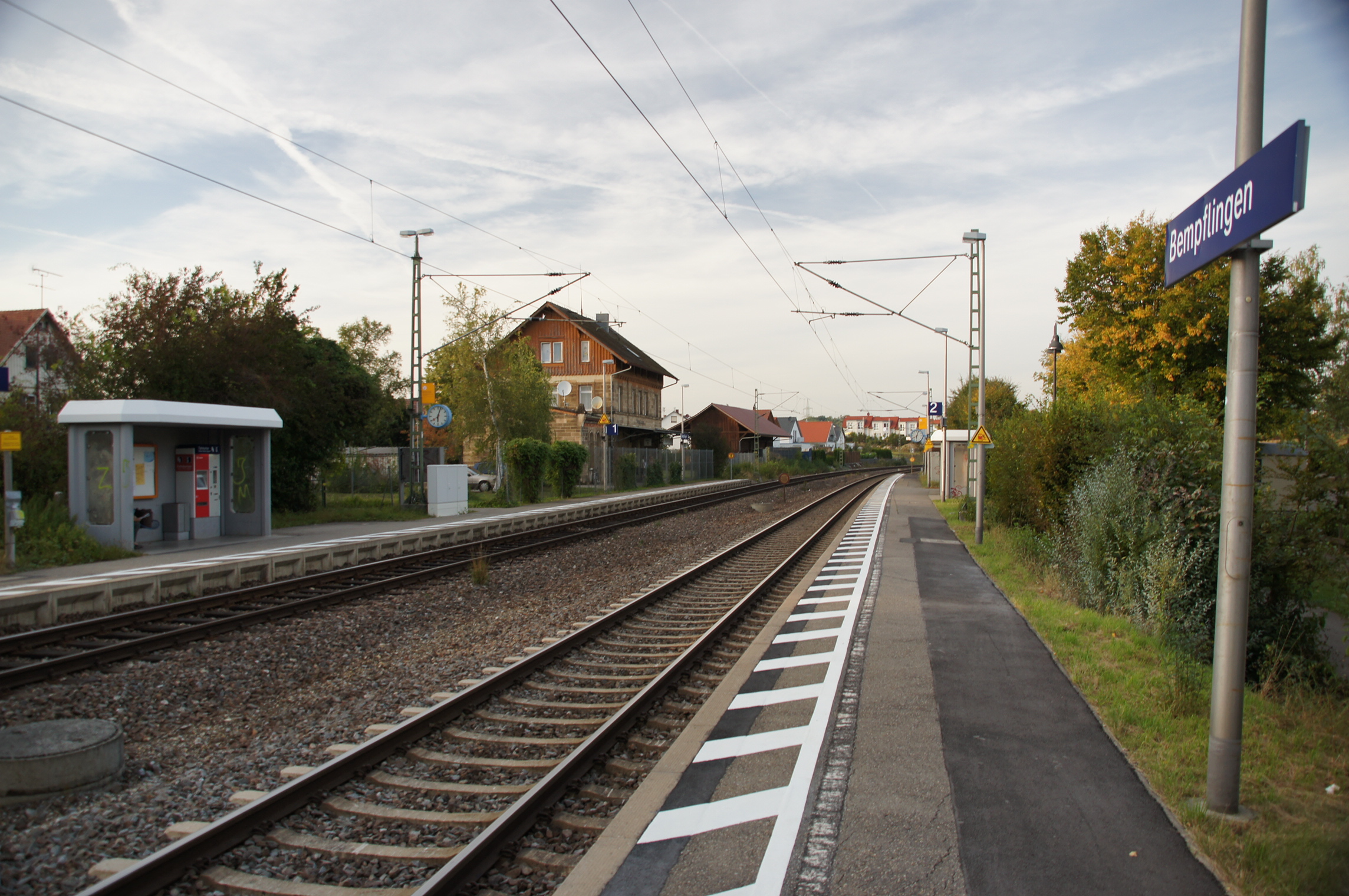
Railway station Bempflingen

Bempflingen is reached by the railway line Plochingen-Tübingen (Stuttgart-Horb am Neckar) to the supra-regional rail network. There are regional trains running at least every hour in the direction of Tübingen and Plochingen. During rush hour there is a stop of the Regionalexpresses Tübingen-Stuttgart, apart from that there is no more connection to Stuttgart without changing trains.

Coming from Nürtingen, Bempflingen is the last stop for which the VVS tariff applies. Until 2008 a DB ticket was still necessary to continue the journey to Metzingen; on January 1, 2009, Bempflingen was integrated into the naldo tariff, so that only a naldo ticket is necessary to continue the journey to Tübingen.

=== Education ===
In Bempflingen there is the Grundschule "Auf Mauern" (On walls), the visit of secondary schools is possible in Neckartenzlingen, Metzingen or Nürtingen. There are also three kindergartens in Bempflingen, two of them (Hanflandweg and Auf Mauern) are located in the main village and one in Kleinbettlingen.

=== Buildings ===
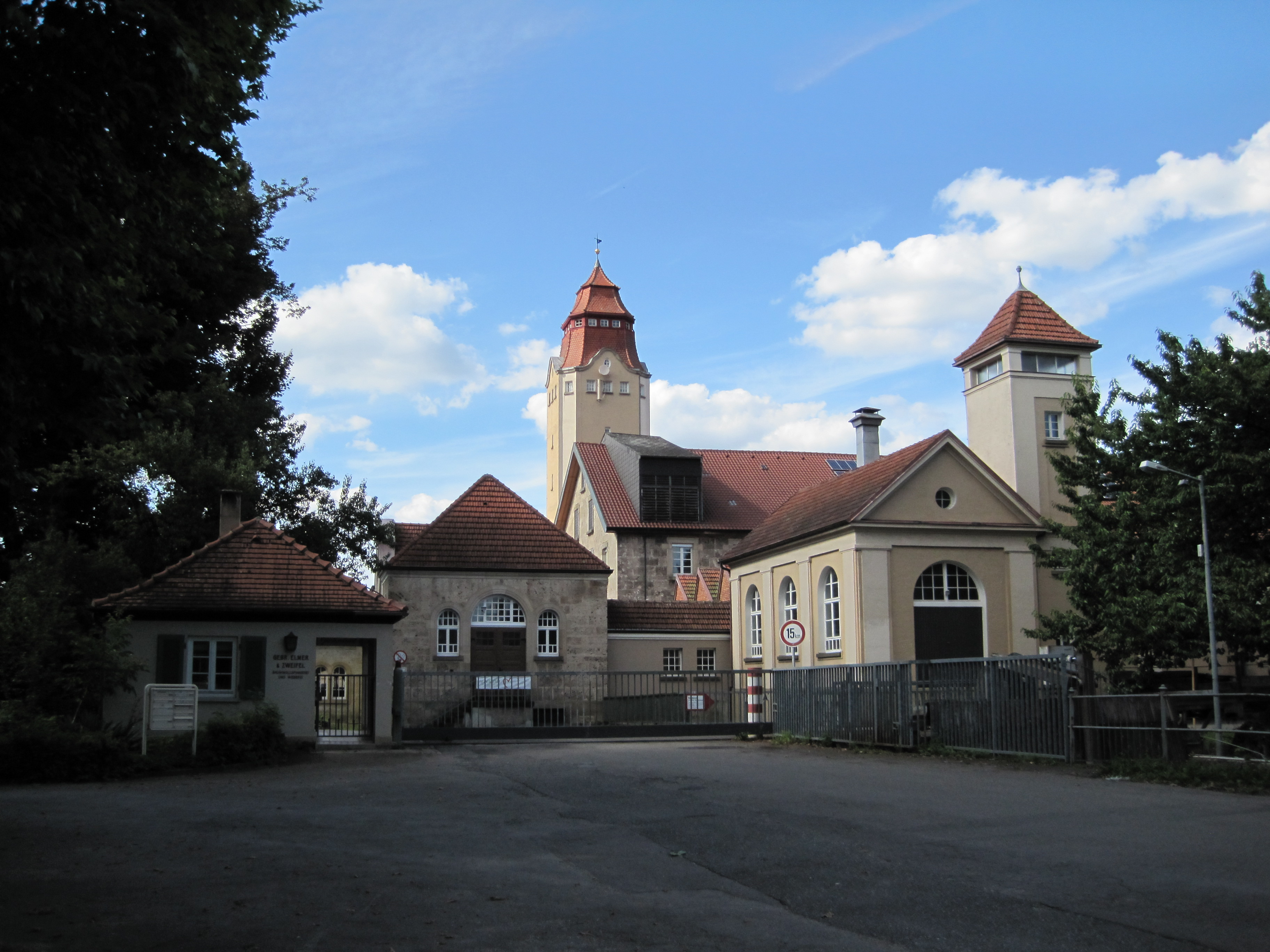
Group of buildings in Bempflingen

- The foundation walls of today's "Bempflinger Mühle" date back to 1659 and the Erms Canal was built for the mill, which was first documented in 1391.
- The evangelic Stephanuschurch was built at the end of the 13th century as a replacement of an older predecessor building in late Romanesque style, of which the north wall and the lower part of the tower are still preserved in the present building. The nave was built in 1827 by the Stuttgart building surveyor Christian Friedrich Roth as Hall church in the Kameralamtsstil with a pulpit altar wall and a three-sided gallery. Chief building officer Christian Friedrich von Leins raised the tower in 1869 in neo-Romanesque style. Architect Heinz Klatte arranged an interior renovation in 1954. Two bells from the years 1468 and 1514 are preserved.
- The schoolhouse was newly built in 1773.

=== Supply and disposal ===
==== Power supply ====
The electricity grid in the community is operated by FairNetz GmbH.

==== Gas supply ====
The natural gas network is operated by FairEnergie GmbH, a subsidiary of Stadtwerke Reutlingen GmbH and EnBW.

==== Water supply ====
The first public water supply was built in 1909. Today, the entire municipal area of Bempflingen and Kleinbettlingen is supplied with pure water from Lake Constance.

==== Sewage disposal ====
The Zweckverband Abwasserreinigung Bempflingen-Riederich operates a sewage treatment plant for the sewage disposal of the communities Bempflingen and Riederich.

==== Waste disposal ====
The waste management company of the district of Esslingen is responsible for waste disposal. There are separate collections for organic waste, household waste and paper.
