= Kohlberg, Baden-Württemberg =

Municipality in Germany

Kohlberg
- Municipality
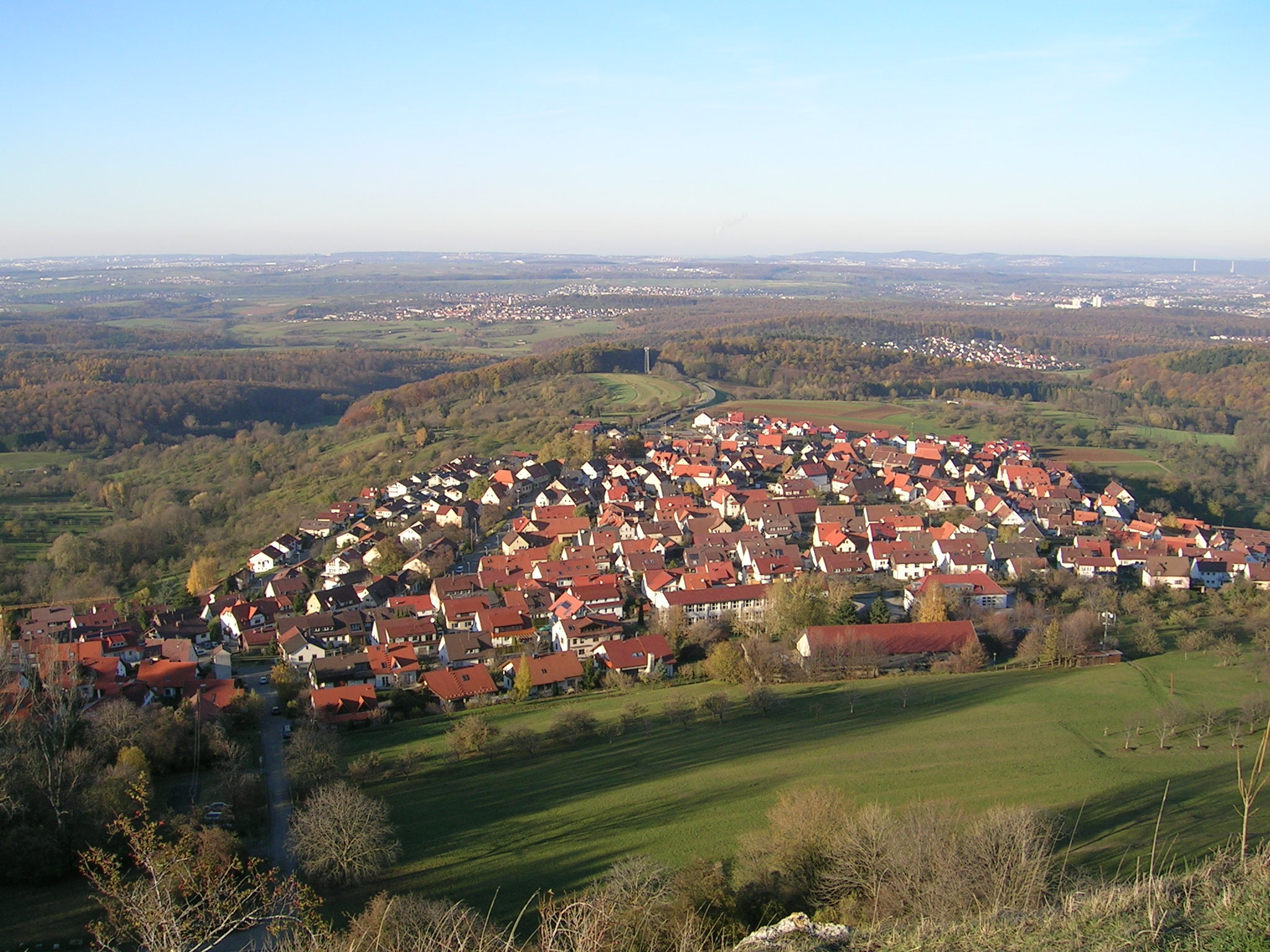
- View from the Jusi towards Kohlberg

- Coat of arms

- Location of Kohlberg within Esslingen district
- Interactive map of Kohlberg
- Location within Germany Location within Baden-Württemberg
- Coordinates: 48°33′28″N 9°20′8″E
- Country: Germany
- State: Baden-Württemberg
- Admin. region: Stuttgart
- District: Esslingen

Government
  - Mayor (2023–31): Thomas Franz

Area
  - Total: 4.38 km^{2} (1.69 sq mi)
- Elevation: 476 m (1,562 ft)

Population (2025-12-31)
  - Total: 2,253
  - Density: 514/km^{2} (1,330/sq mi)
- Time zone: UTC+01:00 (CET)
  - Summer (DST): UTC+02:00 (CEST)
- Postal codes: 72664
- Dialling codes: 07025
- Vehicle registration: ES
- Website: www.kohlberg-wuerttemberg.de

Kohlberg (German pronunciation: [ˈkoːlbɛʁk]) is a municipality in the district of Esslingen in Baden-Württemberg in southern Germany.

== Geography ==
Kohlberg is located on the edge of Swabian Jura at an elevation of 357–673 metres (1,171–2,208 ft).

== Municipality ==
Beside the village of Kohlberg there are no other villages, farms or houses within the municipality.

== Neighboring communities ==
The following towns and municipalities, which belong to the district of Esslingen and to the district of Reutlingen¹, share borders with the municipality of Kohlberg, starting clockwise in the north: Frickenhausen, Neuffen, Metzingen¹ and Grafenberg¹.

== History ==
Kohlberg in Esslingen district

Traces of a settlement in the area of Kohlberg go far back to the time before the birth of Christ. Jurassic chert tools, which had been manufactured in the Neolithic Age (about 3000 to 2000 BC), were found in the field area "Mittlerer Wasen". The tools found suggest that some the inhabitants of Kohlberg area were pastoralists and some were hunter-gatherers. This also applies to the Hallstatt period (800-400 BC), derived from some grave mounds in the upper Autmut valley.

In the following years significant disputes happened around a farm in Kohlberg. These took almost warlike forms in the 15th century, when Emperor Frederick III gave the farm in Kohlberg to Vice Chancellor Ulrich Welzli, who was born in Göppingen, as a hereditary fief. Only the totally unexpected death of Ulrich Welzli made a peaceful solution possible.

Based on an out-of-court deal between the Zwiefalten Abbey and the Ulrich Welzli's brother, who would have inherited the farm, the Rottweil court decided that it should be returned to Zwiefalten Abbey under the following obligation: Zwiefalten Abbey had to pay 1,000 florins to Welzli and had to pay him 100 guilders per year for the rest of his life. In 1467 Frederick III declared that the farm belonged again to the abbey and that it was not any longer af fief. As a consequence, the Abbey got back all its previous rights. Zwiefalten Abbey lent the farm in 1520 to some feudal peasants in Neuhausen an der Erms. Also in 1520, Kohlberg became an independent parish, after it had previously been filial community of Neuffen. The rights of the aristocrats and the Abbey were transferred to Württemberg after the Reformation.

Linen weaving was confirmed to be in place since the 17th century. However, the inhabitants focussed predominantly on agriculture until the middle of the 20th century, and even today there orchards and vineyards, which had been set up in the feudal time by the Zwiefalten Abbey, are well kept.

In Württemberg Kohlberg belonged first to Oberamt Neuffen. 1806 it came to Oberamt Nürtingen and 1938 to district Nürtingen. In the period of World War II the municipality was spared from airstrikes. On 23 April 1945 Kohlberg was occupied by the Americans and French soldiers, and the border between the sectors ran initially straight through the parish. It was later moved, so that the whole parish was in the American sector. With the administration reform 1973, the site was integrated into the district of Esslingen.

== Mayors ==
- 1924-1945: Eugen Schäfer
- 1945: Hermann Schaich
- 1945-1948: Richard Arnold
- 1948-1956: Eugen Schäfer
- 1956-1993: Rolf Winkler
- 1993-2008: Frank Buss
- 2008-2016: Klaus Roller
- since 2016: Rainer Taigel

== Crest ==
Blazon: In the upper part of a divided blade are two silver (white) lilies side by side, and below in silver (white) a blue branch with blue grapes and two blue leaves.

This is an indication for the winemaking history of Kohlberg. The town flag has the colors white and blue. The coat of arms was awarded in 1952 by the state government, the flag in 1973 by the Ministry of Interior.

== Culture and Attractions ==
=== Fruit and Wine ===
- Kohlberg is located on the Württemberg wine road with many attractions.
- Regularly scheduled village festivals are the Cherry Festival and the Kohlberg Wine Festival.

=== Buildings ===
- Winepress, built in 1579

=== Natural Monuments ===
- The Jusi is 673 m high. From there hikers have a wonderful panorama view over Swabia.

== Sons and daughters of Kohlberg ==
- Christian Nathanael Osiander (1781–1855), theologian, General Superintendent of Ulm, Member of Parliament
- August Holder (1850–1918), literary historian and local historian
- Philipp Jakob Manz (1861–1936), industrial architect
