= Erms =

River in Germany

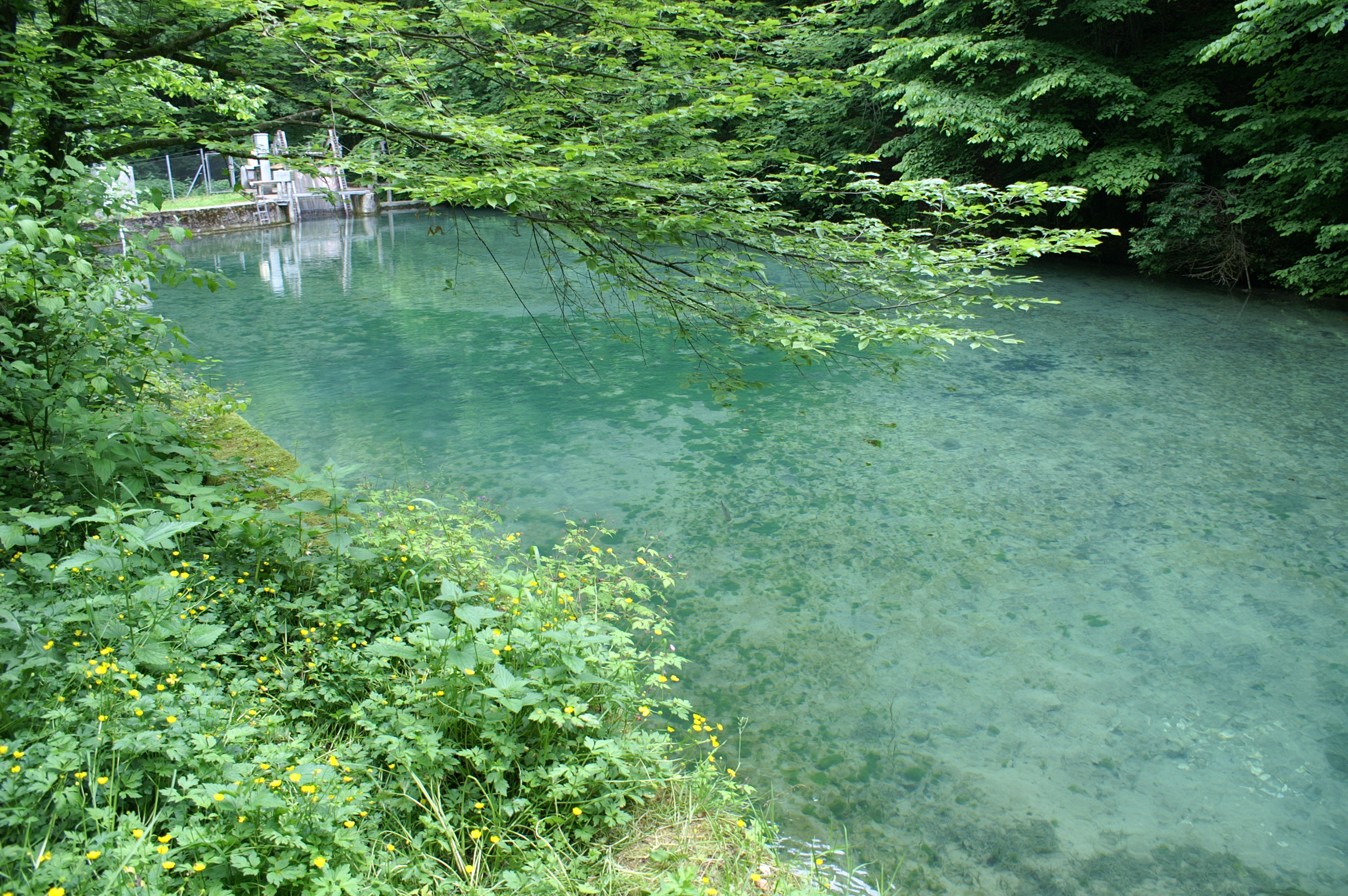
- Karst spring

Location
- Country: Germany
- State: Baden-Württemberg

Physical characteristics
- Source
  - elevation: 617 m above sealevel
- Mouth
  - location: Neckar
  - coordinates: 48.5931°N 9.2364°E
- Length: 32.4 km (20.1 mi)

Basin features
- Progression: Neckar→ Rhine→ North Sea

The Erms (German pronunciation: [ɛʁms]) is a river of the karstified Swabian Alb range in Baden-Württemberg, Germany. It flows into the Neckar in Neckartenzlingen. On its way from the Karst spring to the next large municipality Bad Urach, a former Erms sedimented, especially during floods, no less than eight valley cataracts, where chemically precipitated travertine repeatedly drops c. 2 to 5 metres (7 to 16 ft).

== Geography ==
The Ermstal valley is one of the largest valley systems that have cut into the layer of the Swabian Alb from the northwest. The nearby large waters of the river system of the Rhine lie much deeper than the Danube on the south-eastern side of the Alb, so that regressive erosion of the Rhenish waters is gradually shifting back the European watershed at the expense of the Danube basin. Due to the Neckar river, which runs here particularly close to the Alb's eaves, and the great difference in altitude between them, the Erms possessed sufficient erosive power to form one of the most striking valleys of the Alb's eaves. The valley is rich in karst phenomena. The longitudinal profile, stepped by limestone sinter deposits, was once more conspicuous than today due to several natural reservoirs and favoured the industrial development along the river because of the easily usable water power.

=== Spring ===
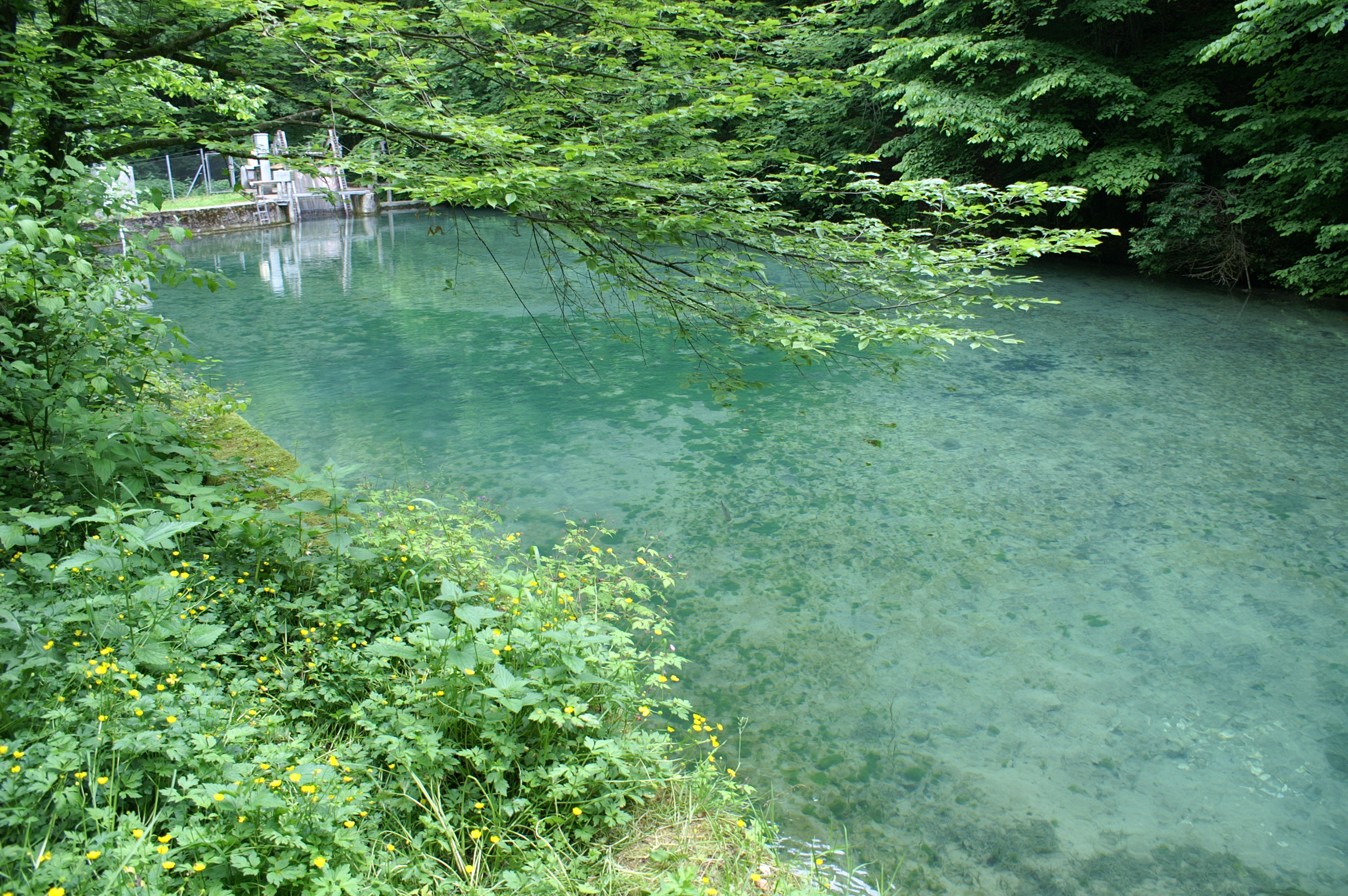
Ermsursprung

The spring known as "Ermsursprung" is located just under one kilometre (0.62 mi) southeast of the village Seeburg in the Mühltal. The average flow rate of the karst spring is between 335 L/s (11.8 cu ft/s) and 380 L/s (13 cu ft/s) (this corresponds to 20.1 m³ or 22.8 m³ per minute). Depending on the weather, the source discharge fluctuates between 67 and 1,000 L/s (2.4 and 35.3 cu ft/s).

=== Course ===
Coming from the Fischburg valley, the much longer Fischbach flows into Seeburg. Its valley is part of the western border of the former Münsingen military training area. Mühltal, Fischburgtal and the Seetal, which flows in from the south, form here a three-part Talspinne.

Between Seeburg and Bad Urach the river Erms flows through the upper Ermstal, which here forms the Border of the villages Wittlingen and Sirchingen. The valley section is characterized by the closely opposite, wooded slopes of the Albtrauf, crowned by limestone rocks. Until the 19th century, several natural lakes existed, dammed by Kalktuffbarren. Since the limestone tuff (precipitated lime) is a good building material that is easy to extract, the lakes gradually disappeared.

In the area of the old town of Urach lies the centre of another valley spider. Here, from the east, the multi-branched valley system of the Elsach, whose sources lie in the Falkensteiner Höhle and in the Elsachbröller, flows out. From the southwest, from the Maisental, where the Uracher Wasserfall and the Gütersteiner Wasserfall lie, the Brühlbach flows into the Elsachbröller. Below Urach, the Stufenrandtal valley, eroded by the Erms river, widens. Down the valley there are more and more traces of the early use of the Erms' water power during industrialisation. In Dettingen there is still a paper mill.

The Glemsbach flows into Neuhausen. Here as in Metzingen, vineyards accompany the course of the river. The Erms leaves the valley of the Jura mountains and flows into the Albvorland. Below Riederich the Riederichbach, which was previously called Stetterbach for a long time, flows out. After the river has passed Bempflingen, it flows into the Neckar at Neckartenzlingen, whose waters reach the North Sea via the Rhine.

=== Catchment area ===
The river Erms drains an area of about 179 km^{2} (69 sq mi), mainly in the middle Swabian Alb and its foreland. Its upper part belongs to the Mittleren Kuppenalb, the lower part almost entirely to the foothills of the central Swabian Alb, where it passes successively through the Neuffen-Vorberge and the Erms-Steinach-Albvorland. Finally, a gusset close to the mouth of the river counts towards the subspace Nürtinger-Esslinger Neckartal of the Fildern.

The highest point in the area reaches about 870 metres (2,850 ft) above sea level in the area of the Römerstein on the Alb plateau.

=== Tributaries ===
Tributaries from the source to the estuary. With length and partial catchment area. Other sources are noted.

Selection, usually without side channels.

Ermsursprung in Mühltal less than one kilometre before Seeburg.

- Trailfinger Bach, upper course through Trailfinger Schlucht and Mühltal to the official origin, about 2 km (1.2 mi). Begins its course at the Trailfinger sewage plant.
- Fischbach, from right in Bad Urach-Seeburg 8.4 km (5.2 mi) and 36 km^{2} (14 sq mi). The Erms together with the Trailfinger Bach is only 3.6 km (2.2 mi) long at the confluence and has an aboveground catchment area of only 8.7 km^{2} (3.4 sq mi).
- Seebach, from left into the Mühlgraben left of the Erms in Seeburg, 1.3 km (0.81 mi).
- (stream from Fleinsbrunnen), from the right into the engine channel down from Seeburg, 1.2 km (0.75 mi).
- Coal Pond Ditch, from left, 1.5 km (0.93 mi).
- (stream from Jakobsbrunnen, from the right, 0.6 km (0.37 mi).
- Grindelbach, from left, 1.1 km (0.68 mi).
- (stream from Fischerbrunnen, from left, 0.3 km (0.19 mi).
- Übereich, alluvial spring inflow from the right into the Triebwerkskanal near Bad Urach-Georgenau, 0.4 km (0.25 mi).
- Sirching Waterfall, from left, 0.1 km (0.062 mi).
- Wittlinger Bach, from the right, 1.8 km (1.1 mi).
- Wiesengraben, from the right in front of the Georgii settlement, under 0.1 km (0.062 mi).
- Nottenbach, from left at the southern edge of the closed development of the central Bad Urach, 1.1 km (0.68 mi).
- Elsach, from the right in the centre of Bad Urach, 5.4 km (3.4 mi) and 30.5 km^{2} (11.8 sq mi).
- (stream from the Seltbachtal), from the left in Bad Urach, 0.5 km (0.31 mi).
- Brühlbach (Erms, Bad Urach) (!), from left, 3.4 km (2.1 mi) and 8.1 km^{2} (3.1 sq mi).
- Eschenbach, from left at the paper mill of Dettingen an der Erms, 1.2 km (0.75 mi).
- Herdterngraben, from the right at the paper mill of Dettingen an der Erms into the Erms canal, 0.5 km (0.31 mi).
- Gweidachgraben, from the right at the paper factory of Dettingen into the Ermskanal, 0.4 km (0.25 mi).
- Talgraben, from the right between Papierfabrik and Dettingen, 3.6 km (2.2 mi) and 4.2 km^{2} (1.6 sq mi).
- Rosstriebbach, from left in Dettingen, 0.6 km (0.37 mi) with right upper course Rohrbach.
- Sulzbach, from right in Dettingen, 1.3 km (0.81 mi).
- Krebsgraben, from right in Dettingen, 1.5 km (0.93 mi).
- Lochbach, from right in Dettingen, 1.4 km (0.87 mi).
- Peteräckergraben, from left in Dettingen into the power plant canal Wasserschlössle next to the river Erms, 1.1 km (0.68 mi).
- Nitzenbach or Nützenbach, from the right in Dettingen, 1.4 km (0.87 mi).
- Saubronnenbach, from left, 1.4 km (0.87 mi).
- Saulbach, from right between Dettingen and Neuhausen an der Erms, 2.3 km (1.4 mi)and 1.9 km^{2} (0.73 sq mi).
- Leberbach, from left in Neuhausen, 2.0 km (1.2 mi) and 1.7 km^{2} (0.66 sq mi).
- Glemsbach, from left in Neuhausen, 4.3 km (2.7 mi) and 11.4 km^{2} (4.4 sq mi). See also Pumped storage plant Glems.
- Wangenbach, from left opposite the development boundary from Neuhausen to Metzingen, 1.2 km (0.75 mi).
- Spalerbach, from the right in Metzingen, 2.4 km (1.5 mi).
- Buchbach or Scheulerbach, from the left into the Ermskanal in Metzingen, 3.3 km (2.1 mi).
- Vogelherdbach, from left into the mentioned Erms canal in Metzingen, 0.8 km (0.50 mi).
- Hölzlebach, from left in Metzingen, 1.1 km (0.68 mi).
- Brühlbach (Erms, Metzingen)* (!), from the right in Metzingen, 1.8 km (1.1 mi).
- Korrenbach, from the right in Metzingen, 2.0 km (1.2 mi).
- Lindenbach, from the right, 3.5 km (2.2 mi) and 3.8 km^{2} (1.5 sq mi).
- Riederichbach, from left to Riederich, 8.2 km (5.1 mi) and 8.9 km^{2} (3.4 sq mi). With section name sequence Riederichbach → Stettertbach → Brühlwiesenbach → Riederichbach.
- Ettwiesenbach, from right to Riederich into the Bempflinger mill canal, 3.0 km (1.9 mi) and 2 km^{2} (0.77 sq mi).
- Steidenbach, from the right in Bempflingen into the Bempflinger Mühlkanal, 2.8 km (1.7 mi) and 2.6 km^{2} (1.0 sq mi).
- Krotenbach, from the right in Bempflingen into the Bempflinger Mühlkanal, 1.6 km (0.99 mi) and 1.4 km^{2} (0.54 sq mi).

== Name and history ==
The name of the Erms goes back to the Roman Empire Armissa, which itself possibly has pre-Roman origins.

During the Roman period, there was a more important Roman settlement at the strategically favourable place of the valley exit, at the place of today's Metzingen, which was called Vicus Armissium. At that time the Ermstal was called Swiggerstal, later the name was used as a landscape designation until the 15th century was transferred to a larger area . The villages came to Württemberg in the Middle Ages and have shared its fate ever since. Therefore, in the 16th century all communities situated along the river Erms were reformed.

Within Württemberg the settlements belonged to Oberamt Urach, only Neckartenzlingen was part of the Oberamt Nürtingen. The towns of Urach were mainly transferred to the district of Reutlingen in 1938 when the district of Urach was dissolved. Bempflingen went with Neckartenzlingen to the district of Nürtingen to the district of Esslingen; the villages above Urach, like Seeburg, Wittlingen and Sirchingen, went to the district of Münsingen in 1938, 1973 also to the Landkreis Reutlingen.

== See also ==
- List of rivers of Baden-Württemberg
