= Maren Steege =

German politician (born 1982)

Member of the Landtag of Baden-Württemberg
- Incumbent
- Assumed office 11 May 2026
- Constituency: Nürtingen

Personal details
- Born: 8 April 1982 (age 44)
- Party: Christian Democratic Union

Maren Steege (born 8 April 1982) is a German politician serving as a member of the Landtag of Baden-Württemberg since 2026. She has served as chairwoman of the Christian Democratic Union in Filderstadt since 2024.
