= Andreas Deuschle =

German politician (born 1978)

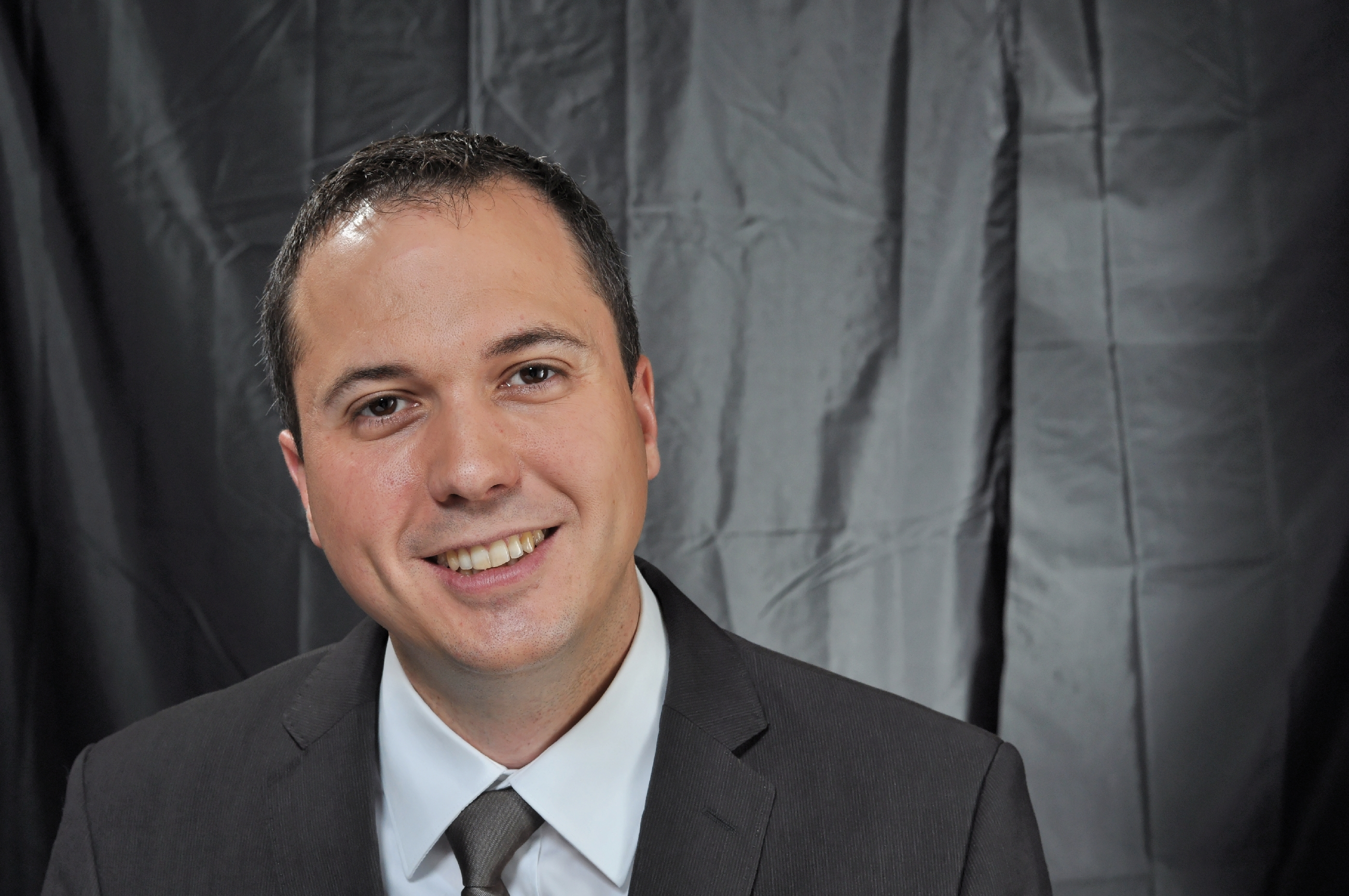
- Deuschle in 2013

Member of the Landtag of Baden-Württemberg
- Incumbent
- Assumed office 1 May 2011
- Preceded by: Christa Vossschulte
- Constituency: Esslingen (2011–2016)

Personal details
- Born: 18 November 1978 (age 47) Nürtingen
- Party: Christian Democratic Union

Andreas Deuschle (born 18 November 1978 in Nürtingen) is a German politician serving as a member of the Landtag of Baden-Württemberg since 2011. He has served as chief whip and deputy group leader of the Christian Democratic Union since 2021.
