= Gottlieb Jakob Planck =

German historian

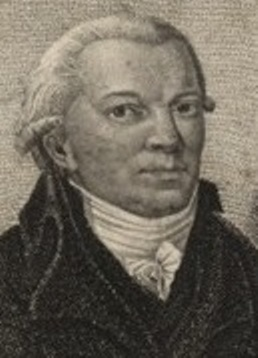
- Born: 15 November 1751; Nürtingen, Duchy of Württemberg
- Died: 31 August 1833 (aged 81); Göttingen, Kingdom of Hannover

Academic background
- Education: University of Tübingen
- Academic advisors: Johann Friedrich Cotta; Jeremias Friedrich Reuß

Academic work
- Institutions: University of Göttingen
- Notable students: Friedrich Christoph Schlosser

Gottlieb Jakob Planck (15 November 1751 – 31 August 1833) was a German theologian and church historian. He was the great-grandfather of physicist Max Planck.

== Biography ==
Planck was born at Nürtingen in Württemberg, where his father was a notary. Educated for the Protestant ministry at Blaubeuren, Bebenhausen and Tübingen, he became a lecturer at Tübingen in 1774, a preacher at Stuttgart in 1780, and a professor of church history at the University of Göttingen in 1784.

At Tübingen he wrote Das Tagebuch eines neuen Ehemannes. In 1781 he published the first volume of Geschichte des protestantischen Lehrbegriffs (History of the Protestant teaching concept); the second volume appeared in 1783, and it was eventually completed in six volumes in 1800. It was followed by an extensive Geschichte der christlich-kirchlichen Gesellschaftsverfassung (History of the Christian church's social constitution) in five volumes (1803–1809).

He died in Göttingen on 31 August 1833. His son Heinrich Ludwig Planck (1785–1831), also professor of theology at Göttingen, published Bemerkungen über den ersten Paulinischen brief an den Timotheus (1808) and Abriss der philosophischen Religionslehre (1821).
