= Elsach =

River in Germany

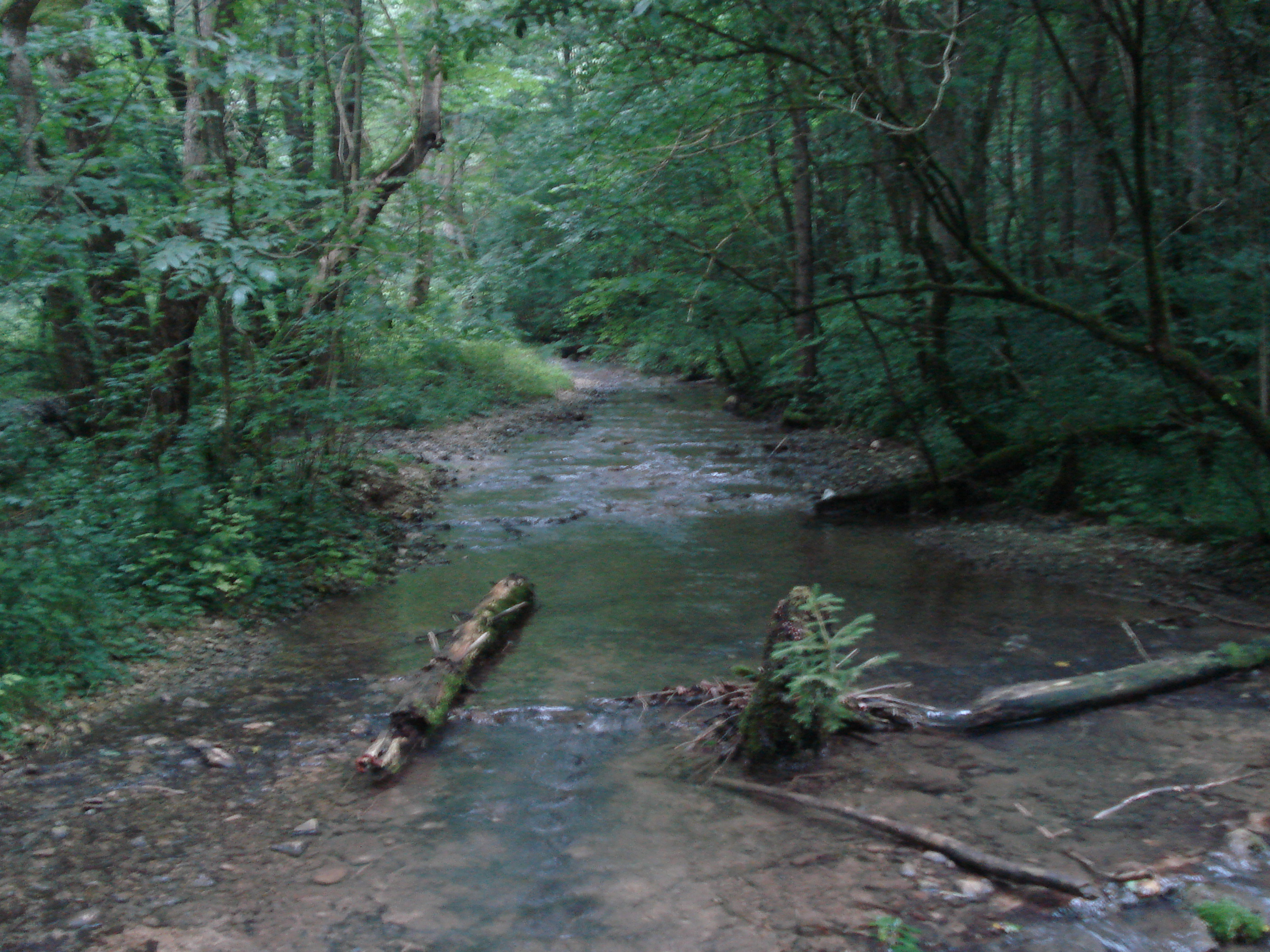

Location
- Country: Germany
- State: Baden-Württemberg

Physical characteristics
- Mouth
  - location: Erms
  - coordinates: 48.4948°N 9.3983°E

Basin features
- Progression: Erms→ Neckar→ Rhine→ North Sea

Elsach is a river of Baden-Württemberg, Germany. It flows into the Erms in Bad Urach.

== See also ==
- List of rivers of Baden-Württemberg
