= Hanna Marie Klek =

German chess player (born 1995)

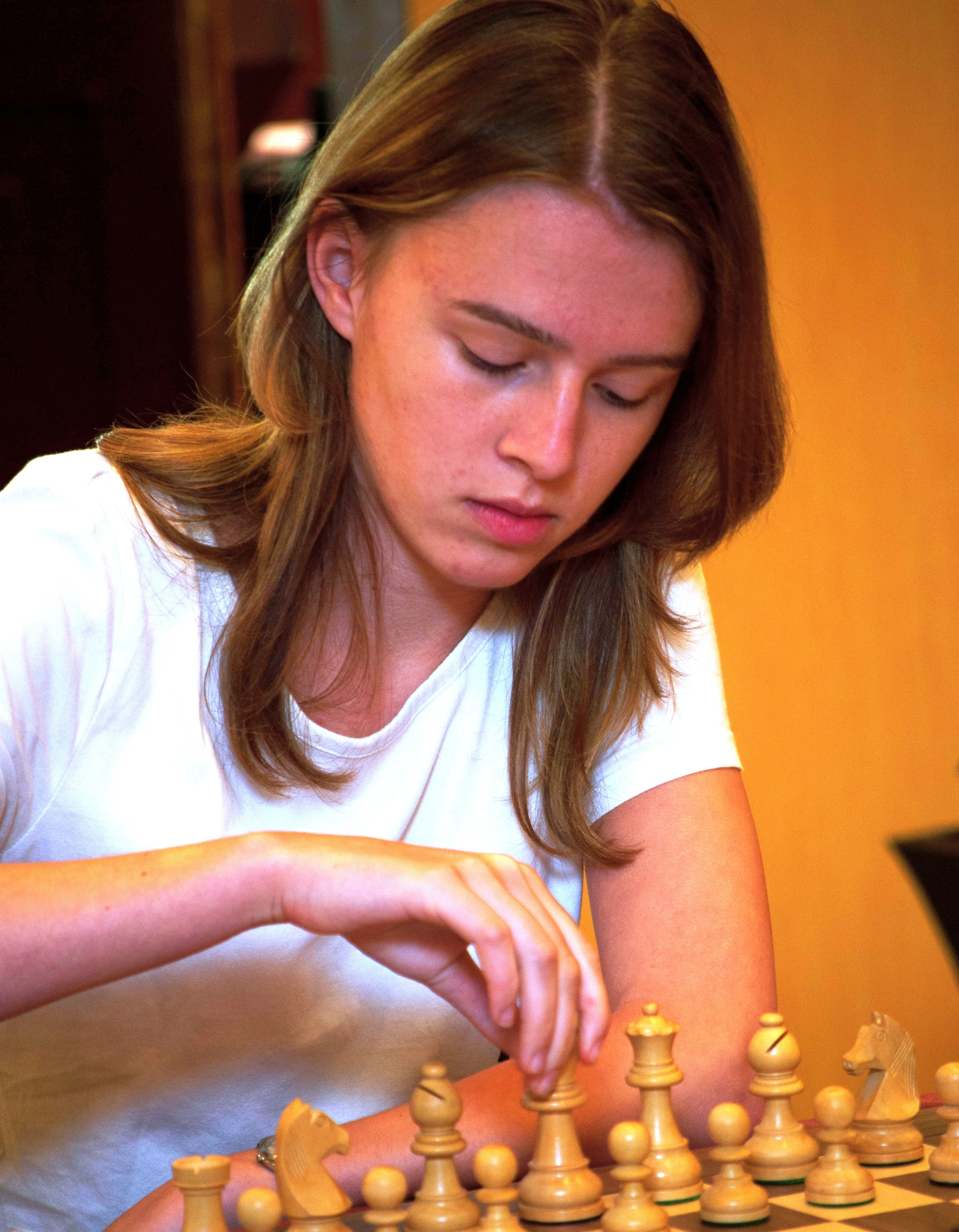
- Hanna Marie Klek in 2012

Personal information
- Born: 11 January 1995 (age 31) Nürtingen, Baden-Württemberg, Germany

Chess career
- Country: Germany
- Title: Woman Grandmaster (2017)
- Peak rating: 2376 (January 2017)

Hanna Marie Klek (born 11 January 1995) is a German chess player who holds the title of Woman Grandmaster (WGM, 2017). She won the German Women's Chess Championship (2013) and bronze medal in European Women's Team Chess Championship (2025).

== Biography ==
In 1999 her family - Hanna Marie Klek has two sisters - moved to Erlangen. Her father Konrad Klek is the church musician, theologian and university teacher. After graduating from the Ohm-Gymnasium in 2012, she studied mathematics at the Friedrich-Alexander University in Erlangen-Nuremberg and currently psychology at the Otto-Friedrich-University in Bamberg.

Hanna Marie Klek learned to play chess at the age of eight. She was multiple German Girls Chess Championships winner: U12 (2006, 2007), U14 (2008) and U16 (2011). In 2011 she was 2nd (behind Nastassia Ziaziulkina) at the World Youth Chess Championship in Girls U16 age group in Caldas Novas and 5th at the German Women's Chess Championships in Bonn.

In 2013 in Bad Wiessee Hanna Marie Klek won the German Women's Chess Championship. In 2021 she won the German Master chess tournament for women.

Hanna Marie Klek played for Germany in the Women's Chess Olympiads:

- In 2008, at reserve board in the 38th Chess Olympiad (women) in Dresden (+2, =0, -4),
- In 2022, at third board in the 44th Chess Olympiad (women) in Chennai (+2, =1, -3),
- In 2024, at fourth board in the 45th Chess Olympiad (women) in Budapest (+4, =2, -2).

Hanna Marie Klek played for Germany in the European Women's Team Chess Championships:

- In 2021, at third board in the 14th European Team Chess Championship (women) in Čatež ob Savi (+2, =4, -2),
- In 2023, at fourth board in the 15th European Team Chess Championship (women) in Budva (+1, =4, -2),
- In 2025, at second board in the 16th European Team Chess Championship (women) in Batumi (+3, =5, -0) and won team bronze medal.

Hanna Marie Klek played for Germany in the Women's Chess Mitropa Cups:

- In 2013, at first board in the 10th Chess Mitropa Cup (women) in Meissen (+4, =1, -4) and won team silver medal,
- In 2017, at first board in the 14th Chess Mitropa Cup (women) in Balatonszárszó (+5, =1, -5).

In 2017, she was awarded the FIDE Woman Grandmaster (WGM) title.
