= Jeremias Friedrich Reuß =

German theologian

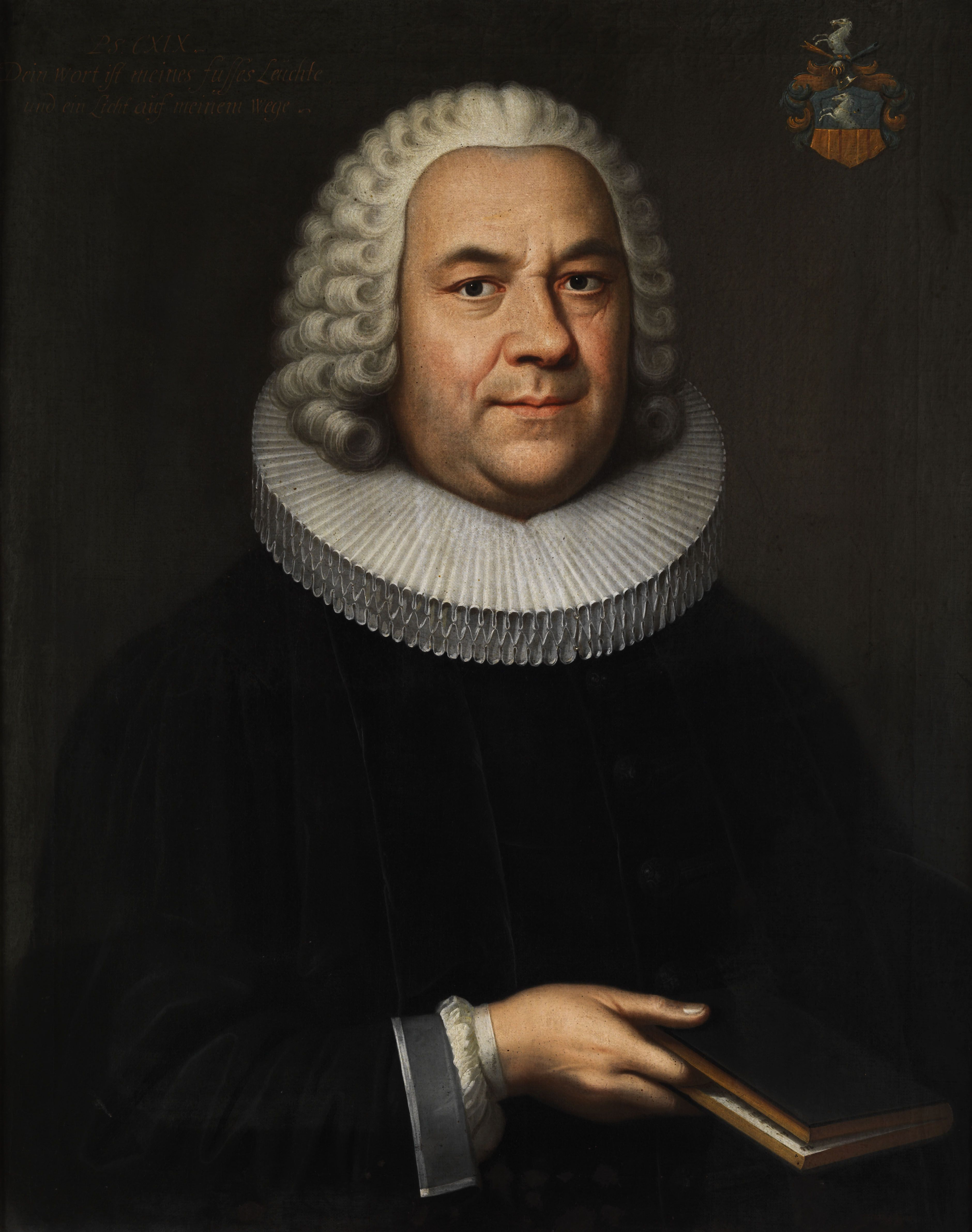
- Born: 7 December 1700; Horrheim, Duchy of Württemberg
- Died: 6 March 1777 (aged 76); Tübingen, Duchy of Württemberg
- Known for: Opposition to pietism
- Spouse: Clara Catharina von Creuz (m. 1740; died 1768)
- Children: 4, including Jeremias David Reuß

Academic background
- Education: University of Tübingen (MA, 1723); University of Copenhagen (Dr. theol., 1742)
- Academic advisor: Johann Albrecht Bengel

Academic work
- Institutions: Tübinger Stift; University of Copenhagen; University of Tübingen
- Notable students: Gottlieb Jakob Planck; Gottlob Christian Storr

Jeremias Friedrich Reuß (8 December 1700 – 6 March 1777) was a German Lutheran theologian. He was the father of the philologist and librarian Jeremias David Reuß.

Reuss was a disciple of Johann Albrecht Bengel at the Denkendorf monastery and then studied in Tübingen, where he read the writings of contemporary Catholic mystics while remaining in contact with Bengel. On a recommendation from Nicholas Ludwig von Zinzendorf, in 1732 he became chaplain to the Danish King Christian VI and professor of theology at the University of Copenhagen, where he published against the pietism movement. He was also a member of the committee for the improvement of the Danish Bible translation. In 1739–40 and 1748–49 he served as the rector of the university.

On 24 February 1749 he was appointed the General Superintendent and Chief Consistory Councillor of the duchies of Schleswig and Holstein, and he moved to Rendsburg. In 1757 he became a professor (Professor primarius theologiae) at the University of Tübingen and at the same time chancellor of the university, provost of the Collegiate Church of Tübingen, and titular abbot of the Lorch monastery.
