= Buhlbach =

Buhlbach may refer to:

- Buhlbach (Baiersbronn), village in the municipality of Baiersbronn in the county of Freudenstadt, Baden-Württemberg, Germany
- Buhlbach (Rechtmurg), right-hand tributary of the Rechtmurg in the parish of Buhlbachsaue in the municipality of Baiersbronn in the county of Freudenstadt, Baden-Württemberg, Germany. Flows through the Buhlbachsee.
