= Brohlbach =

Brohlbach may refer to:

- Brohlbach (Moselle), a river of Rhineland-Palatinate, Germany, tributary of the Moselle
- Brohlbach (Rhine), a river of Rhineland-Palatinate, Germany, tributary of the Rhine
