= Brühlbach (Erms, Bad Urach) =

River in Germany

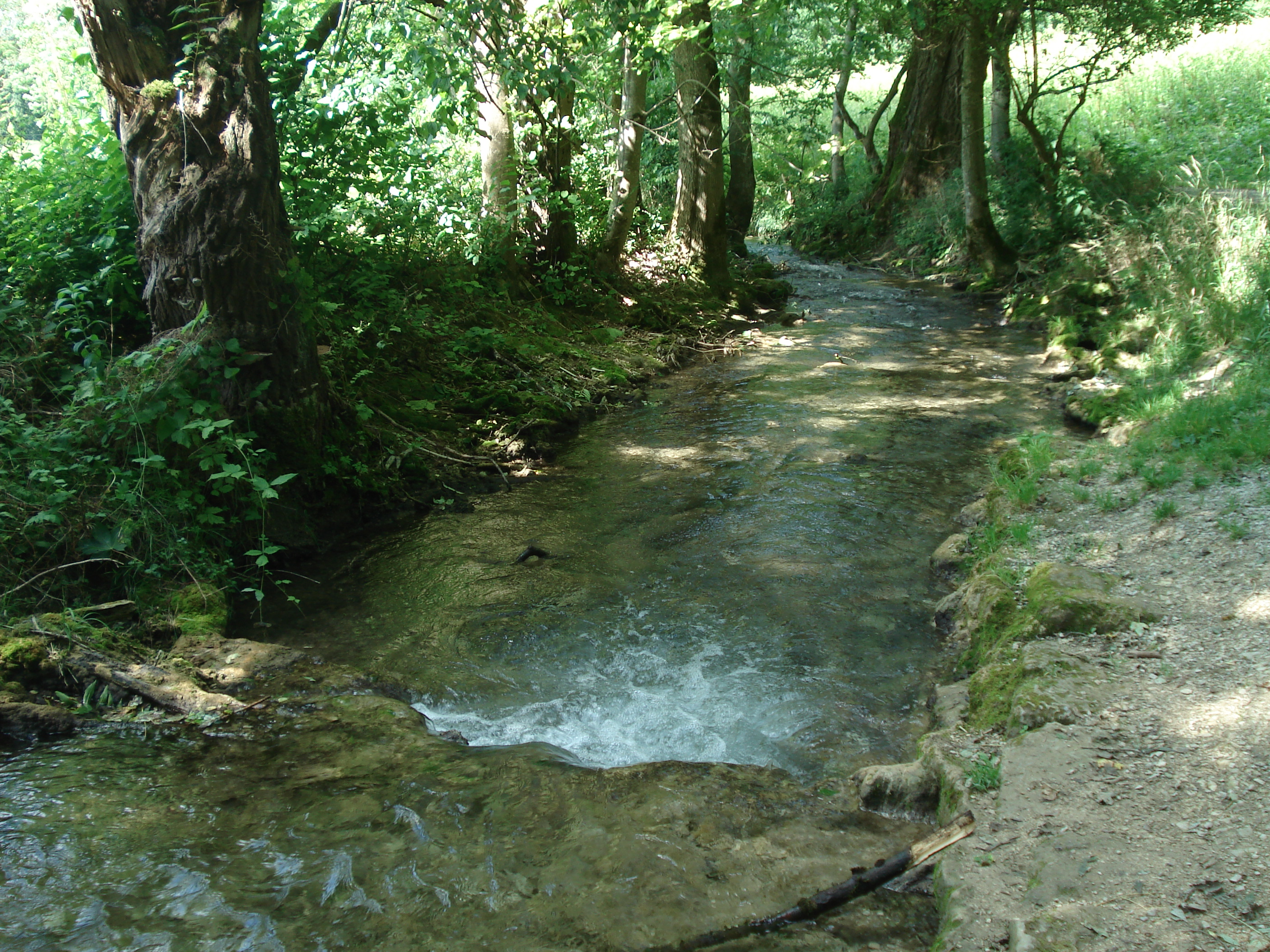
- The Brühlbach between the waterfall and Bad Urach

Location
- Country: Germany
- State: Baden-Württemberg

Physical characteristics
- Mouth
  - location: Erms
  - coordinates: 48°30′22″N 09°22′28″E

Basin features
- Progression: Erms→ Neckar→ Rhine→ North Sea

The Brühlbach is a river in Baden-Württemberg, Germany. It flows into the Erms near Bad Urach.

== Geography ==
=== Sources ===
The springs of the Brühlbach are located about 150 m southwest of the Urach waterfall. They are several karst springs, which emerge in a rugged limestone plateau. The water comes from the plateau around Würtingen (a part of St. Johann). There, rainwater seeps through the calcareous rock layers. The carbonated water absorbs lime and collects on the water-impermeable marl layer below. Approximately 28 hours after its infiltration, the water reappears in the Brühlbach springs. The flow varies depending on weather and season from about 70 L/s up to 420 L/s. In exceptionally dry summers the springs can even dry up.

=== Course ===
After its source, the Brühlbach falls down the Urach waterfall. Below it is strengthened by further springs. It flows in a predominantly northern direction through the "Brühl" and – after including the river "Gütersteinbach" from the waterfall Gütersteiner Wasserfall – through the "Maisental". Near the Bad Urach gauge on the northwest edge of the city, the Brühlbach flows into the Erms.

== See also ==
- List of rivers of Baden-Württemberg
