= Neckartailfingen =

- Municipality
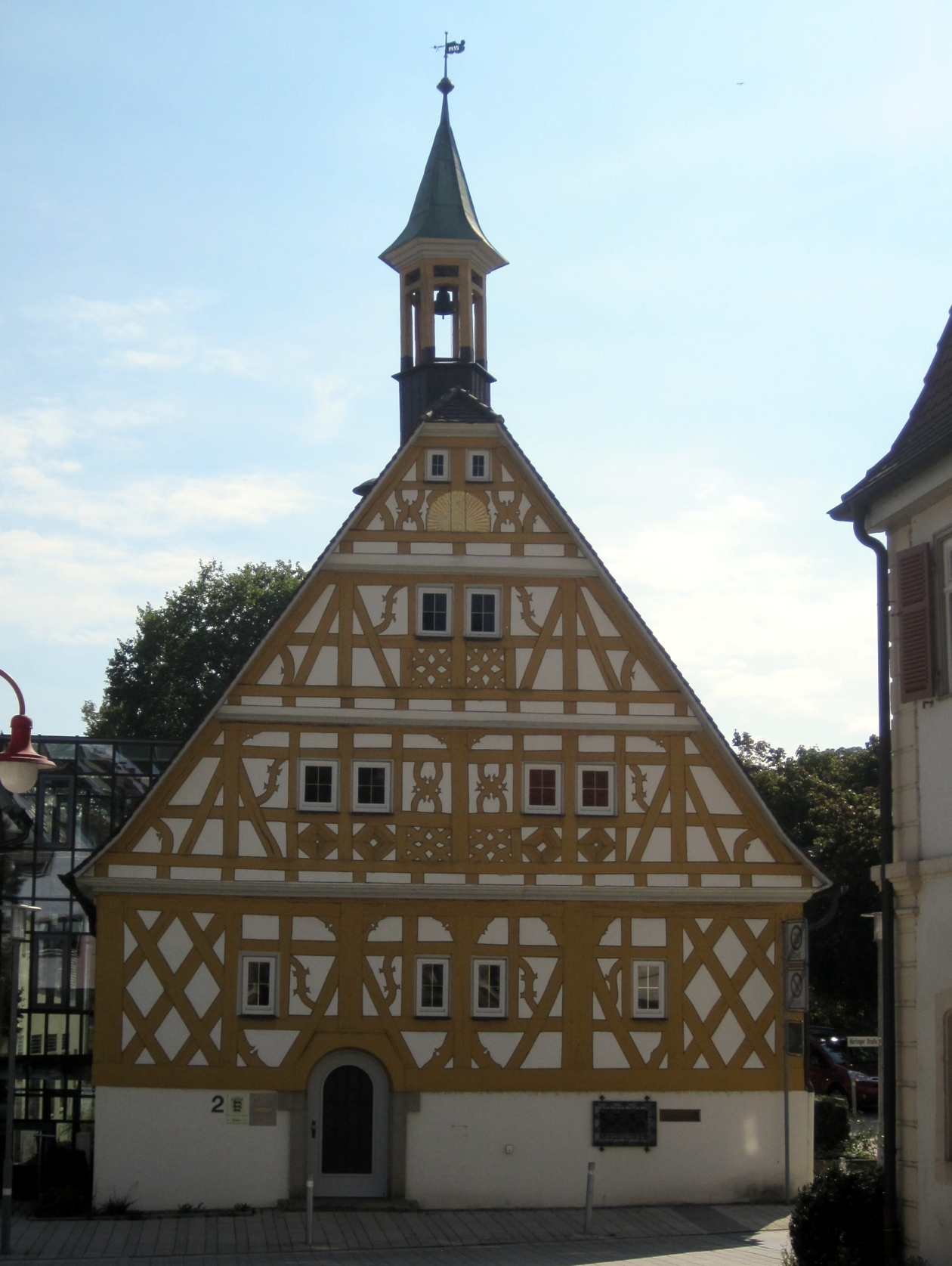
- Neckartailfingen town hall

- Coat of arms

- Location of Neckartailfingen within Esslingen district
- Interactive map of Neckartailfingen
- Location within Germany Location within Baden-Württemberg
- Coordinates: 48°36′52″N 9°16′5″E
- Country: Germany
- State: Baden-Württemberg
- Admin. region: Stuttgart
- District: Esslingen

Government
  - Mayor (2022–30): Wolfgang Gogel

Area
  - Total: 8.26 km^{2} (3.19 sq mi)
- Elevation: 282 m (925 ft)

Population (2025-12-31)
  - Total: 3,854
  - Density: 467/km^{2} (1,210/sq mi)
- Time zone: UTC+01:00 (CET)
  - Summer (DST): UTC+02:00 (CEST)
- Postal codes: 72666
- Dialling codes: 07127
- Vehicle registration: ES
- Website: www.neckartailfingen.de

Neckartailfingen is a municipality in Germany, located approximately 20 km (12 mi) south of Stuttgart. It is located on the river Neckar.

== History ==
Neckartailfingen was first mentioned in 1090 in the Hirsau codex (Codex Hirsaugiensis) as Tagelvingen. Built by order of the Hirsau abbey, the town's landmark church—the Romanesque Martinskirche—was probably completed in the year 1111. In 1536, the town became Protestant, together with the office Nürtingen and received in 1541 the first village school of the former district Nürtingen.

In the Thirty Years' War Neckartailfingen was destroyed after the Battle of Nördlingen (1634) by the infamous dragoons of colonel Walter Butler of Roscrea. Only after a few years the fugitive inhabitants returned and slowly re-built their village again.

== Economy and infrastructure ==
=== Traffic ===
Neckartailfingen has always been an important transit point. At the time of the stagecoaches Neckartailfingen was an important station for changing horses.

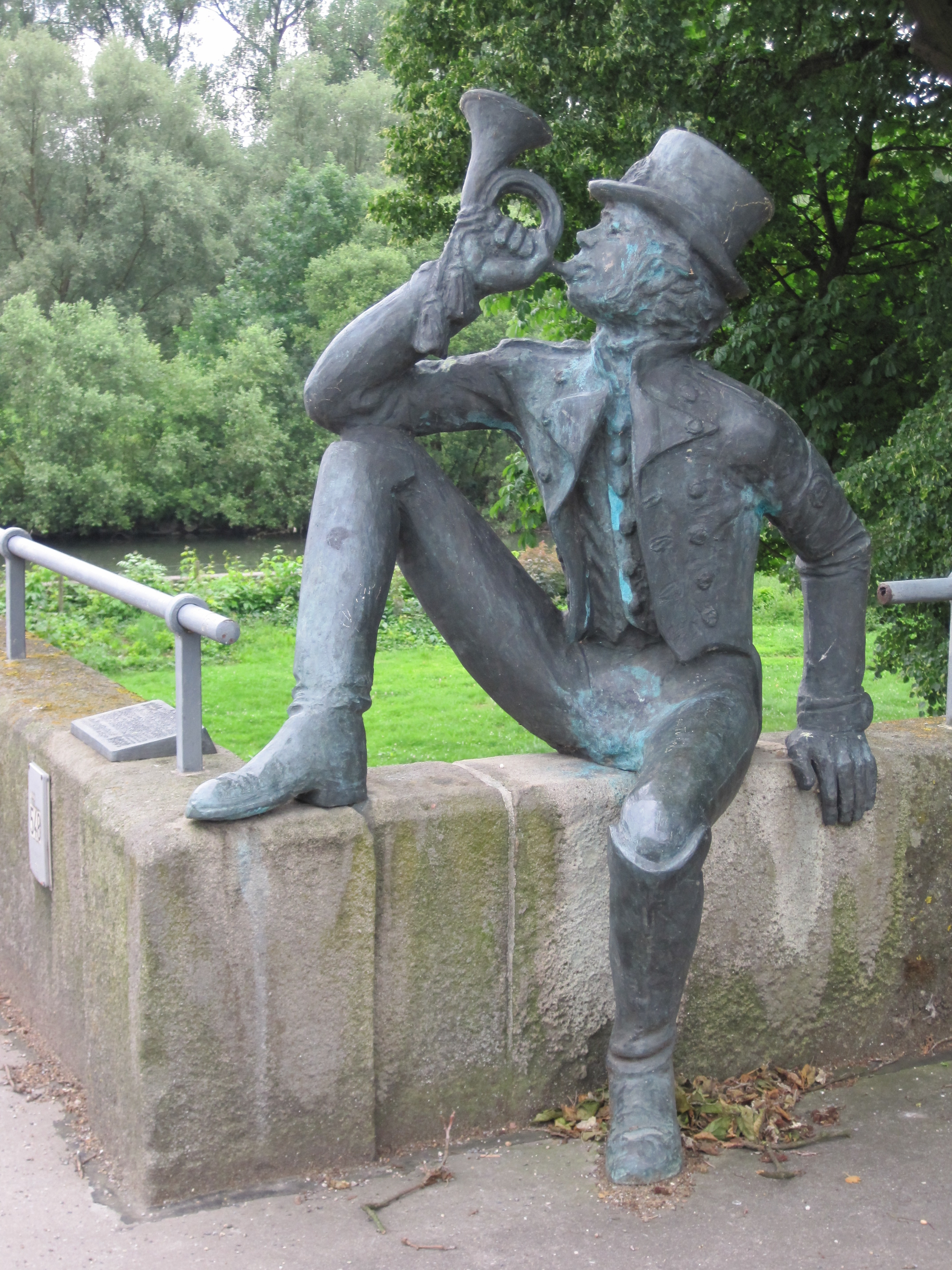
Neckartailfingen Postilion

Until 1976, the Deutsche Bundesbahn maintained a station at the Plochingen-Tübingen railway, which was about two kilometers away from the place.

In 1995, the bypass of the Bundesstraße 297 was completed. This road runs between the municipality and the Neckar in a tunnel.

The public transport is operated by the Verkehrs- und Tarifverbund Stuttgart. There are the bus lines 188 (to Nürtingen) and 190 (to Aichtal). The line 75 (to Bernshausen or Stuttgart-Degerloch stops just on the outskirts.

== Education ==
Neckartailfingen has with the Liebenau school a primary school. In addition, there are three kindergartens in the place. A music school is for the pupils from the village and the surrounding areas.

The soprano Lore Wissmann was born in the place.
