= Frickenhausen =

- Municipality
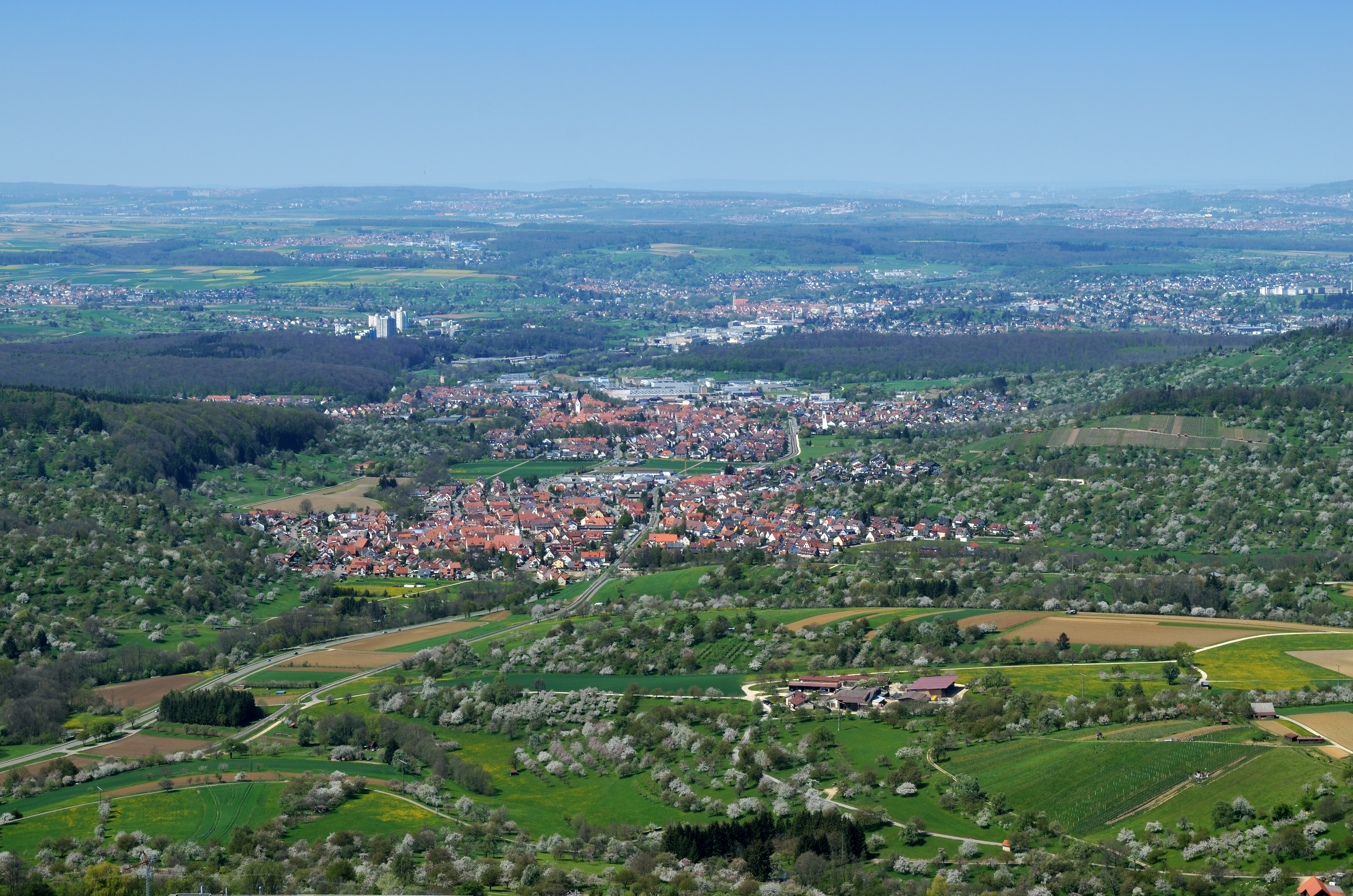
- Aerial view of Frickenhausen

- Coat of arms

- Location of Frickenhausen within Esslingen district
- Interactive map of Frickenhausen
- Location within Germany Location within Baden-Württemberg
- Coordinates: 48°35′34″N 9°21′40″E
- Country: Germany
- State: Baden-Württemberg
- Admin. region: Stuttgart
- District: Esslingen
- Subdivisions: 3

Government
  - Mayor (2018–26): Simon Blessing

Area
  - Total: 11.35 km^{2} (4.38 sq mi)
- Elevation: 323 m (1,060 ft)

Population (2025-12-31)
  - Total: 9,202
  - Density: 810.7/km^{2} (2,100/sq mi)
- Time zone: UTC+01:00 (CET)
  - Summer (DST): UTC+02:00 (CEST)
- Postal codes: 72636
- Dialling codes: 07022, 07025 (Linsenhofen), 07123 (Tischardt)
- Vehicle registration: ES
- Website: www.frickenhausen.de

Frickenhausen (German pronunciation: [fʁɪkn̩ˈhaʊzn̩]) is a town in the district of Esslingen in Baden-Württemberg in Germany.

== History ==
For the first time the municipality was called in the early 14th century Frickenhusen. The main source of income was the growing of wine. However, epidemics, war and bad harvests made the income volatile, so many people worked from mid-18th century on linen weaving, spinning and flax.

Today's Protestant church was built in 1500 as a late Gothic village church.

== Religion ==
Since the Reformation Frickenhausen is predominantly Protestant. Today there is a Protestant church in each of the three municipal parts. In the center there is also a Roman Catholic church and since several years a New Apostolic congregation.

== Districts ==
=== Tischardt ===
The municipality Tischardt was incorporated on April 15, 1972 to the municipality Frickenhausen. The coat of arms was adopted in 1923, it shows in a blue shield a silver table, behind are three silver trees.

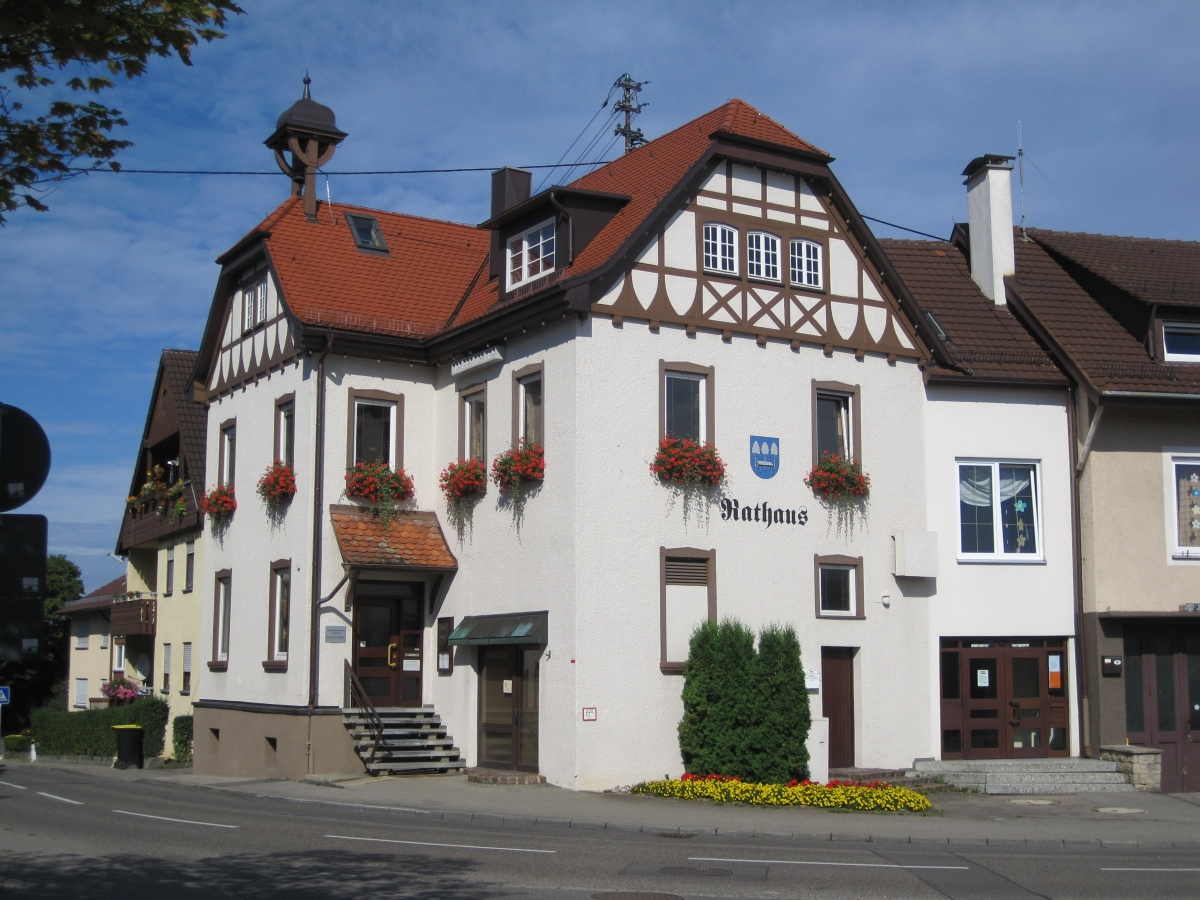
Town hall Tischardt

=== Linsenhofen ===
Linsenhofen came on January 1, 1975, by incorporation to Frickenhausen. Linsenhofen was first mentioned in 1137 in the Zwiefalter Chronik. The coat of arms can be detected since 1778. On a seal two men are seen, holding a grape between them standing.

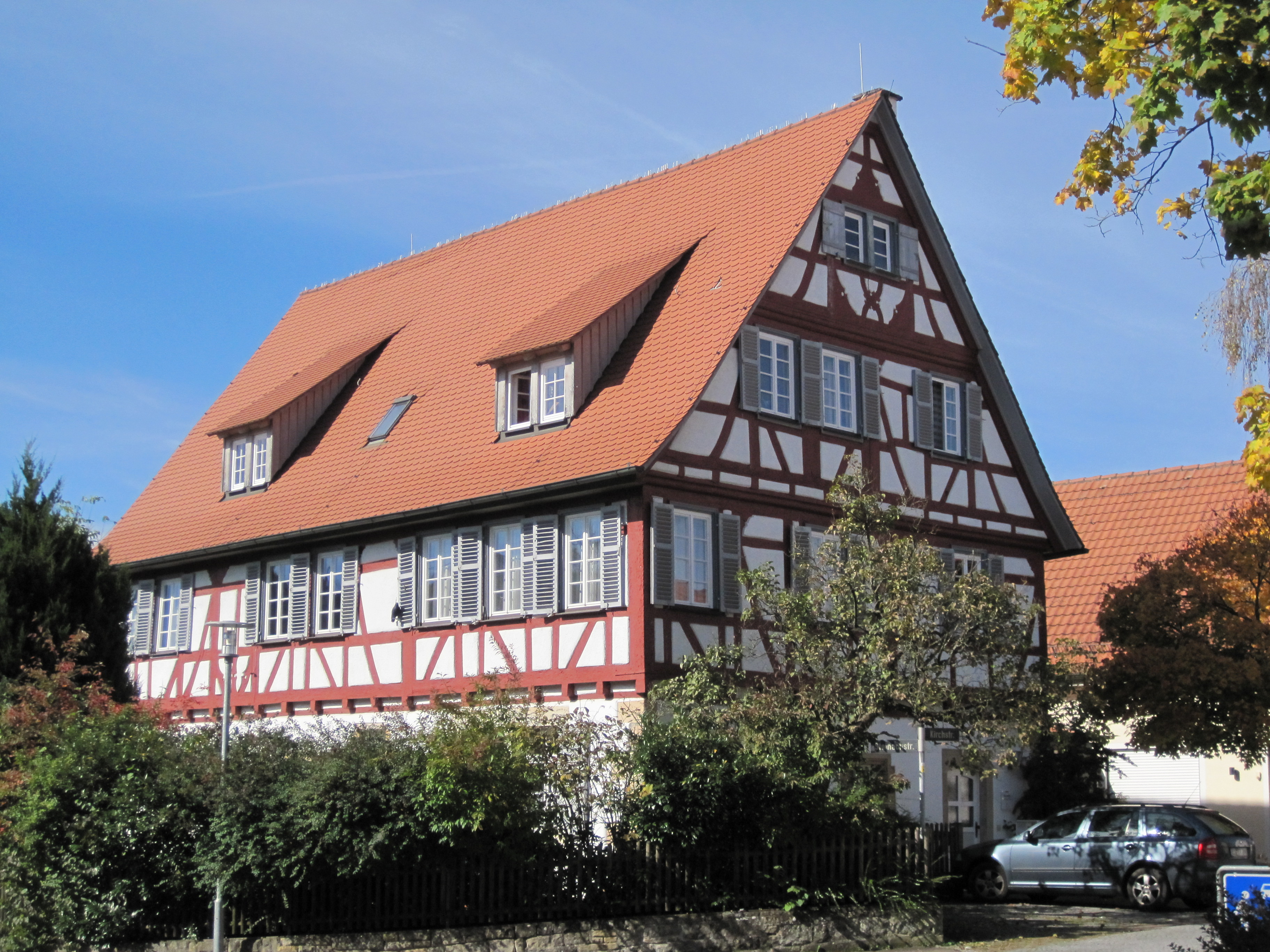
Rectory Linsenhofen

== Personalities ==
- Erich Scherer, mayor 1948-1986
- Ludwig König, longtime councilor
- Marianne Ellinger, longtime councilor 1971–2001, deputy mayor 1981-2001

=== Personalities who have worked locally ===
- Dieter Auch (born 1941), politician (SPD), former member of parliament, lives in the district Linsenhofen
- Carla Bregenzer (born 1946), politician (SPD), former member of Landtag, lives in Frickenhausen
- Marvin Plattenhardt (born 1992), professional football player for Hertha BSC, grew up in Frickenhausen

== Literature ==
- Schwenkel, Hans: Heimatbuch des Kreises Nürtingen. Band 2. Würzburg 1953, S. 223–243.
- Lorenz, Sönke, Schmauder, Andreas (Hrsg.): Frickenhausen, Tischardt, Linsenhofen – Aus neun Jahrhunderten Ortsgeschichte. Gemeinde Frickenhausen 2000, ISBN 3-00-006828-7.
- Löffelad, Peter: Die Flurnamen der Gemeinde Frickenhausen. PL-Verlag, Spraitbach 2010, ISBN 978-3-9813258-7-4.
- Der Landkreis Esslingen. - Hrsg. vom Landesarchiv Baden-Württemberg in Verbindung mit dem Landkreis Esslingen, Jan Thorbecke Verlag, Ostfildern 2009, ISBN 978-3-7995-0842-1, Band 1, pages 546–561.
