= Jusi =

Coordinates: 48°32′59″N 9°20′21″E

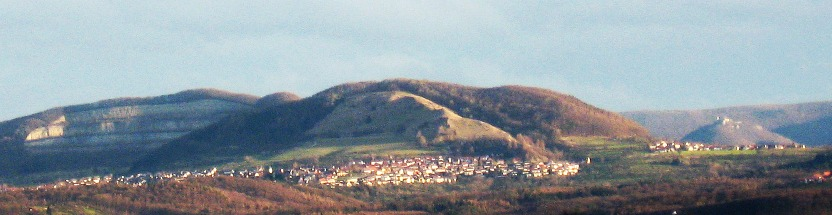

Highest point
- Elevation: 672.8 m (2,207 ft)

Geography
- Location: Baden-Württemberg, Germany

Jusi is the residual of a volcano, an erosional outlier of the Swabian Alb, Baden-Württemberg, Germany.

This category of extinct volcanos is only found within a range of 25 km of Bad Urach. It is the largest of the 355 residuals. Many of them are unrecognizable in the geological relief. Their tuffic pipe could only be identified by seismo-electric methods. These volcanos were active in the time before 17 - 16 million years.
