= Großbettlingen =

- Municipality
- Coat of arms

- Location of Großbettlingen within Esslingen district
- Interactive map of Großbettlingen
- Location within Germany Location within Baden-Württemberg
- Coordinates: 48°35′25″N 9°18′32″E
- Country: Germany
- State: Baden-Württemberg
- Admin. region: Stuttgart
- District: Esslingen

Government
  - Mayor (2020–28): Christopher Ott

Area
  - Total: 4.23 km^{2} (1.63 sq mi)
- Elevation: 358 m (1,175 ft)

Population (2025-12-31)
  - Total: 4,221
  - Density: 998/km^{2} (2,580/sq mi)
- Time zone: UTC+01:00 (CET)
  - Summer (DST): UTC+02:00 (CEST)
- Postal codes: 72663
- Dialling codes: 07022
- Vehicle registration: ES, NT
- Website: www.grossbettlingen.de

Großbettlingen is a municipality in the district of Esslingen in Baden-Württemberg in southern Germany. Großbettlingen is about 5 km from Nürtingen. Unlike many small, German villages, Großbettlingen is not administered with any other villages.
