= Neckartenzlingen =

- Municipality
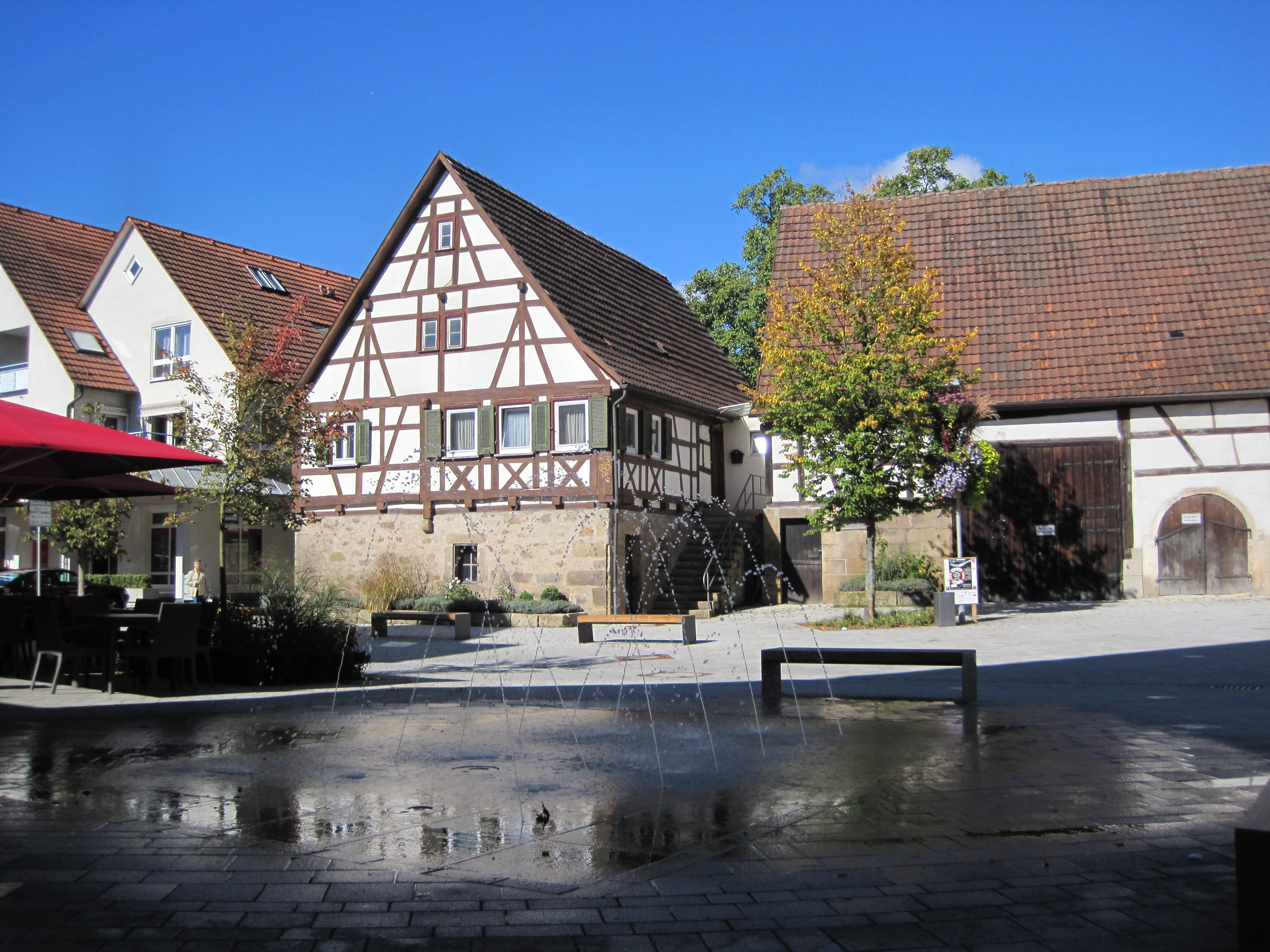
- Fountain in the town center

- Coat of arms

- Location of Neckartenzlingen within Esslingen district
- Interactive map of Neckartenzlingen
- Location within Germany Location within Baden-Württemberg
- Coordinates: 48°35′21″N 9°14′46″E
- Country: Germany
- State: Baden-Württemberg
- Admin. region: Stuttgart
- District: Esslingen

Government
  - Mayor (2016–24): Melanie Gollert

Area
  - Total: 9.03 km^{2} (3.49 sq mi)
- Elevation: 292 m (958 ft)

Population (2025-12-31)
  - Total: 6,222
  - Density: 689/km^{2} (1,780/sq mi)
- Time zone: UTC+01:00 (CET)
  - Summer (DST): UTC+02:00 (CEST)
- Postal codes: 72654
- Dialling codes: 07127
- Vehicle registration: ES
- Website: www.neckartenzlingen.de

Neckartenzlingen is a town in the district of Esslingen in Baden-Württemberg in southern Germany.

== Geography ==
It is located 10 km north of Reutlingen, and 25 km south of Stuttgart.

== Demographics ==
Population development:

Year	Inhabitants
1990	5,804
2001	6,329
2011	6,199
2021	6,356

== Twin towns — sister cities ==
Neckartenzlingen is twinned with:

- Komló, Hungary

== People ==
- Gottlob Bauknecht (1892-1976), German businessman
