= Nürtingen =

- Town
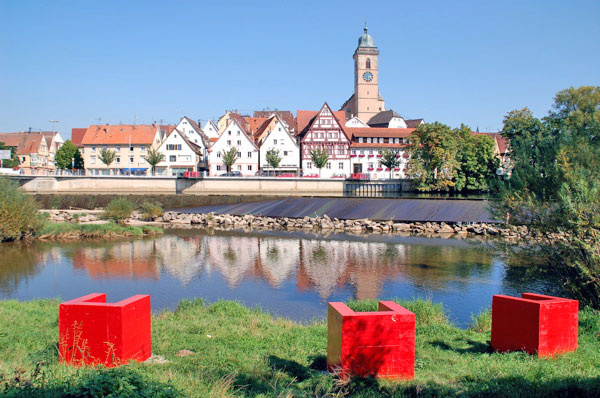

- Coat of arms

- Location of Nürtingen within Esslingen district
- Interactive map of Nürtingen
- Location within Germany Location within Baden-Württemberg
- Coordinates: 48°38′N 9°20′E
- Country: Germany
- State: Baden-Württemberg
- Admin. region: Stuttgart
- District: Esslingen

Government
  - Mayor (2019–27): Johannes Fridrich

Area
  - Total: 46.88 km^{2} (18.10 sq mi)
- Elevation: 291 m (955 ft)

Population (2025-12-31)
  - Total: 40,898
  - Density: 872.4/km^{2} (2,259/sq mi)
- Time zone: UTC+01:00 (CET)
  - Summer (DST): UTC+02:00 (CEST)
- Postal codes: 72601–72622
- Dialling codes: 07022
- Vehicle registration: ES, NT
- Website: nuertingen.de

Nürtingen (German pronunciation: [ˈnʏʁtɪŋən]; Swabian: Nirdeng) is a town on the river Neckar in the district of Esslingen in the state of Baden-Württemberg in southern Germany.

== History ==
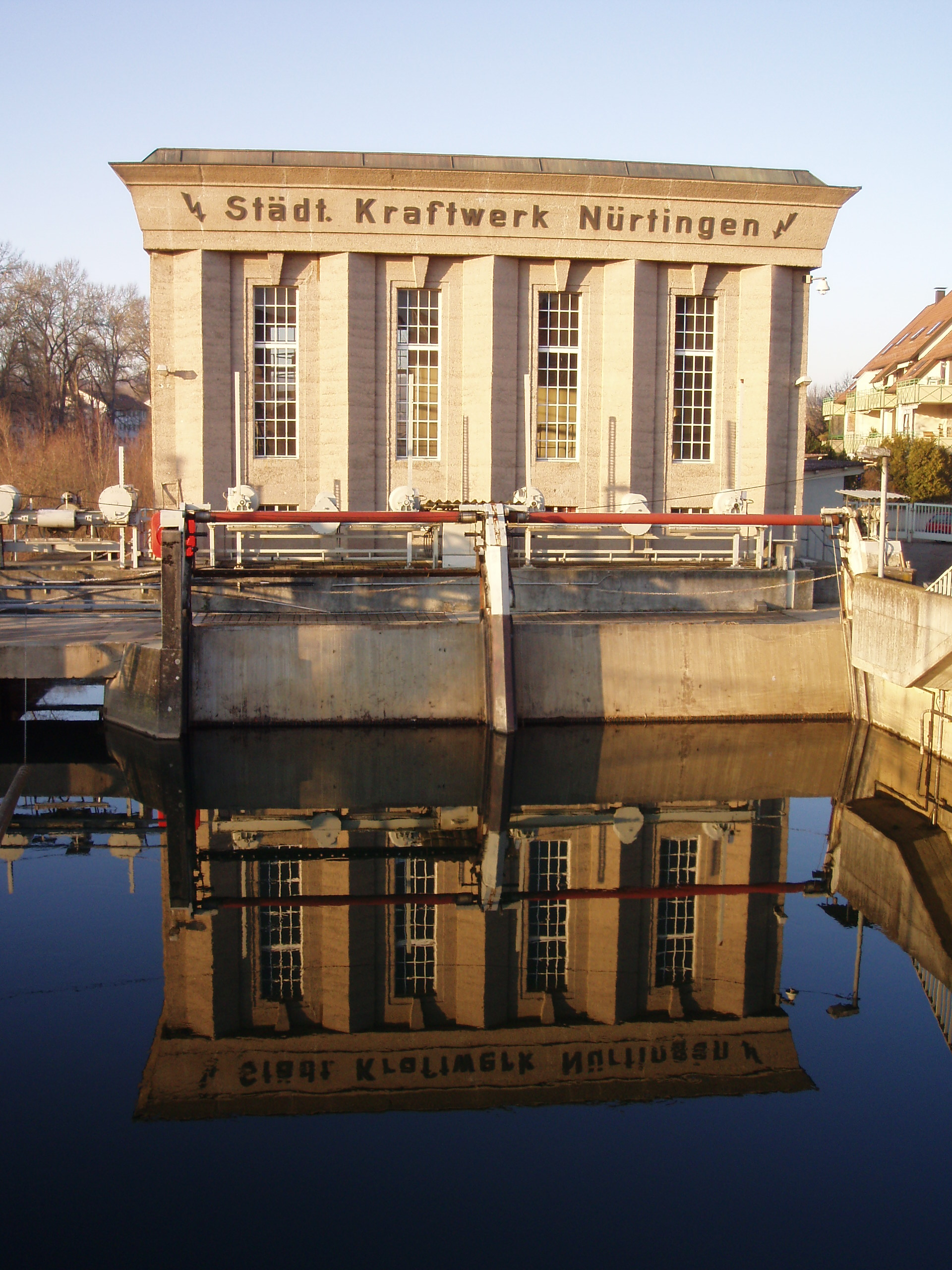
Nürtingen power plant

The following events occurred, by year:

- 1046: First mention of Niuritingin in the document of Speyer. Heinrich III gave Nürtingen as a gift to the chapter of Speyer
- around 1335: Nürtingen received city rights
- 1421: From this date, Nürtingen was the domicile of the Württemberg widows of former sovereigns.
- 1442: In the treaty of Nürtingen between Count Ludwig I and his brother Ulrich V the County of Württemberg was divided into a Stuttgart half and an Urach half
- 1602: The Maientag, a famous folklore procession and celebration, was first recorded
- 1634: Half of the population died in the Thirty Years' War and of the plague
- 1750: 133 buildings were burned down in the great fire
- 1783/1784: Friedrich Hölderlin and Friedrich Wilhelm Joseph von Schelling were pupils of the Latin school (German: Lateinschule). They are still commemorated in the town by the street name Schellingstraße and the name of a high school Hölderlin-Gymnasium.

=== 19th century ===
The Amt Nürtingen, an Oberamt (district) since 1758, was expanded in 1807, one year after the founding of the Kingdom of Württemberg, to include the Oberamt Neuffen as part of the new administrative structure of Württemberg. In 1859, Nürtingen was connected to the network of the Royal Württemberg State Railways via the Plochingen–Immendingen railway line. Thus, the Oberamt town of Nürtingen developed into an industrial town towards the end of the 19th century. Initially, the textile industry predominated, which later changed towards the metalworking industry. Nürtingen was long known as the "City of Grey Roofs" because cement was produced in Nürtingen from 1872 to 1975. Since 1900, the "Portlandzementwerke Heidelberg" owned the Nürtingen cement works. The “Tälesbahn”, which opened in June 1900 for passenger traffic between Nürtingen and Neuffen, was also used for freight traffic from June 21 to transport the limestone for cement from the “Hörnle” quarry to the factory.

=== 20th century ===
During the Nazi era there were in today's urban area 17 forced labor camps and accommodations with "Eastern workers", prisoners of war and "foreign workers", who had to work in the local companies, such as Maschinenfabrik Gebrüder Heller. At the present location of the secondary schools was the Mühlwiesenlager with "Eastern workers". Eleven names of victims of the "euthanasia" murders are known; they were killed in Grafeneck or Hadamar. They also caused that all in so-called "mixed marriages" living men were brought to concentration camps and murdered there.

A Sinti child born in Nürtingen, Anton Köhler, was with most of his siblings brought in 1944 from the Catholic orphanage St. Josephpflege in Mulfingen to Auschwitz-Birkenau and killed after his parents had been murdered.

- 1945 : A few bombs hit Nürtingen. The Tiefenbachtal (a valley south of Nürtingen) was an escape route for German soldiers.
- 1948 : The population increased from 10,000 to 17,000 due to refugees and displaced persons from the former eastern territories of Germany
- 1960: Population exceeds 20,000 – as a result Nürtingen became Große Kreisstadt on 1 February 1962
- 1973 : The district of Nürtingen was merged into the district of Esslingen

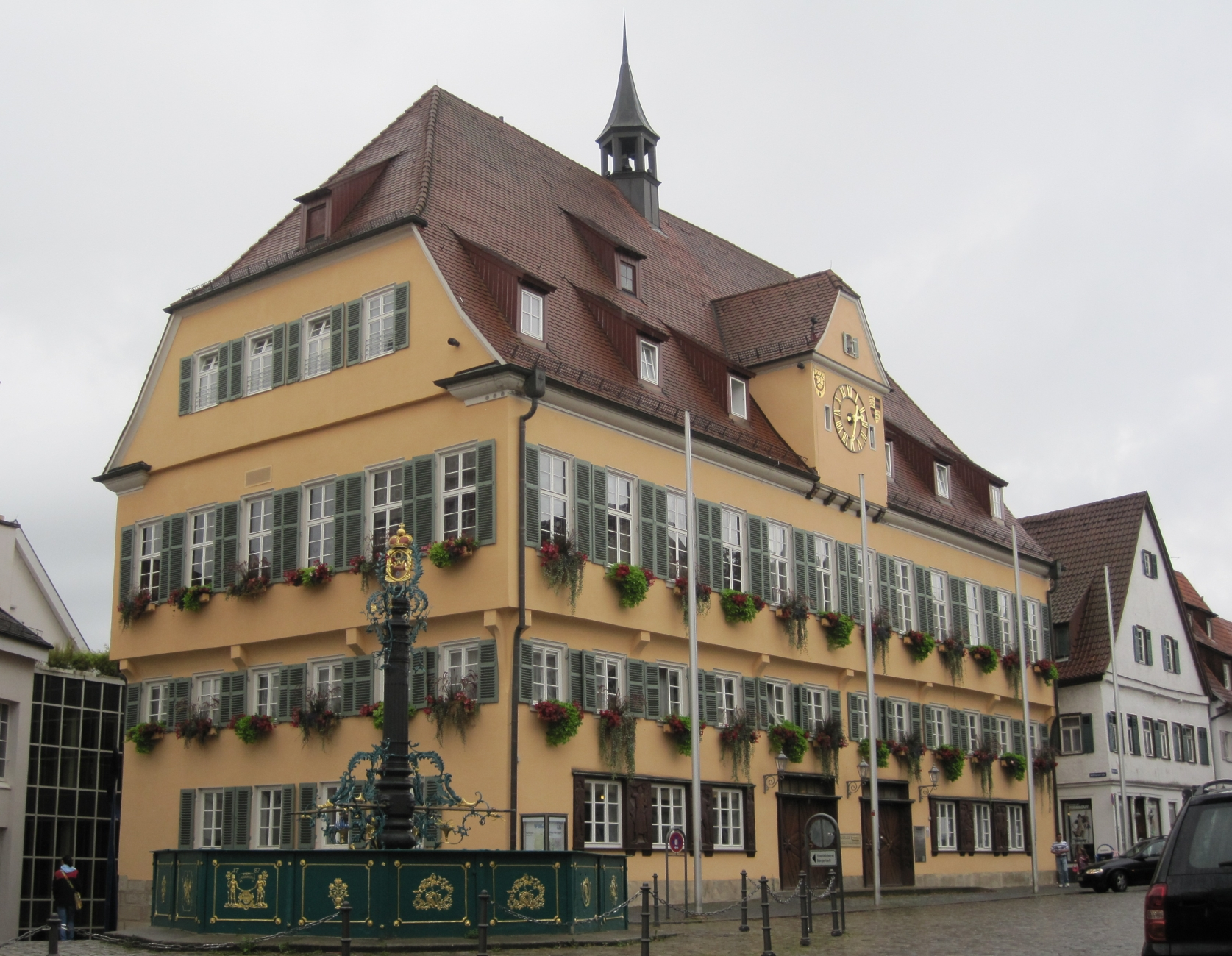
Town hall

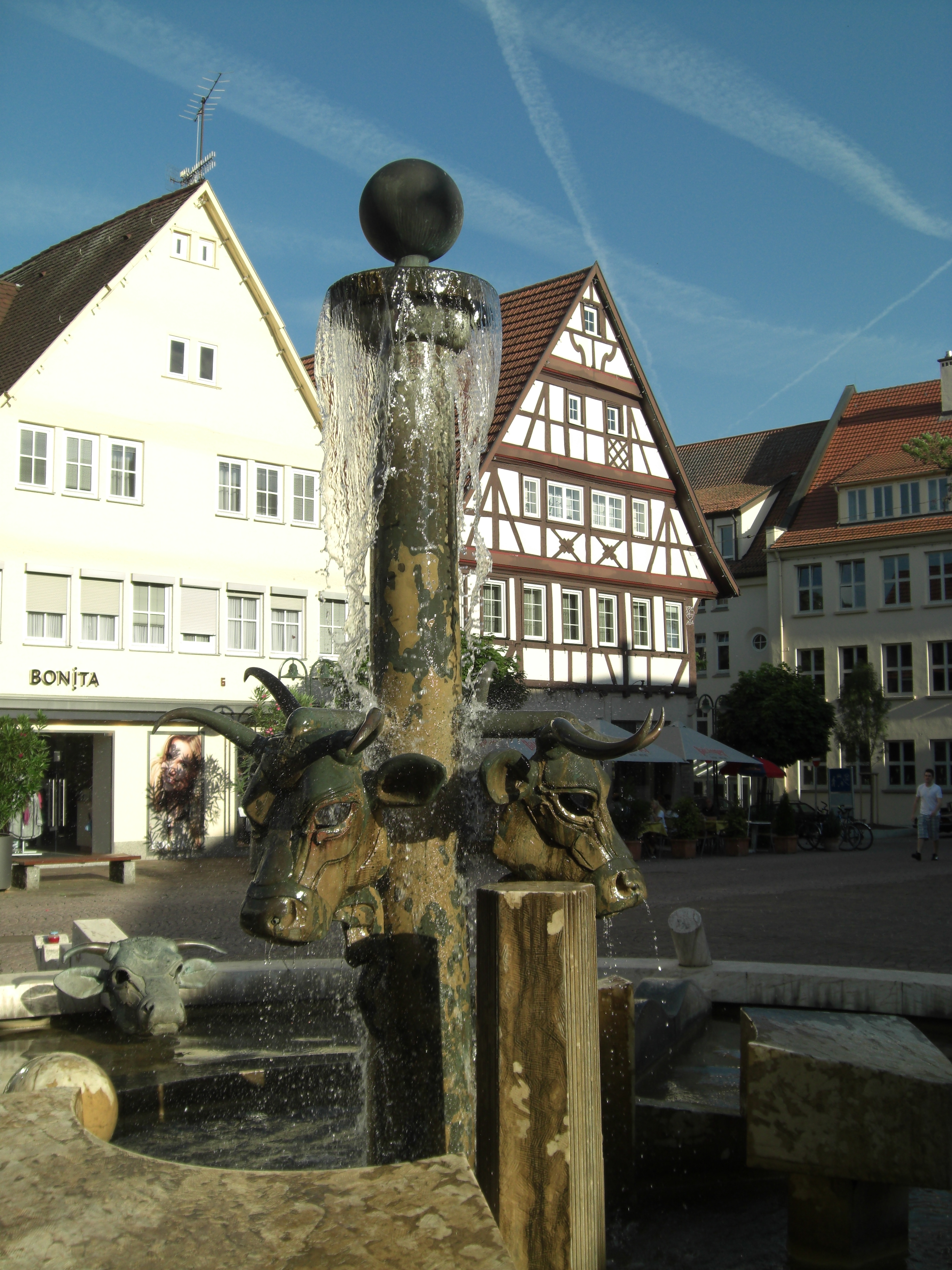
Ox fountain

== Education ==
Nürtingen is home to Nürtingen-Geislingen University of Applied Science, also known as the Hochschule für Wirtschaft und Umwelt Nürtingen-Geislingen. The school hosts undergraduate and graduate programs in business administration, finance, real estate, and landscape architecture. Programs are taught in English and German, with a Master of Science in International Finance being taught through its growing European School of Finance, which partners with the German Institute for Corporate Finance, the European Derivatives Institute, the Deutsche Börse, and the Eurex exchange.

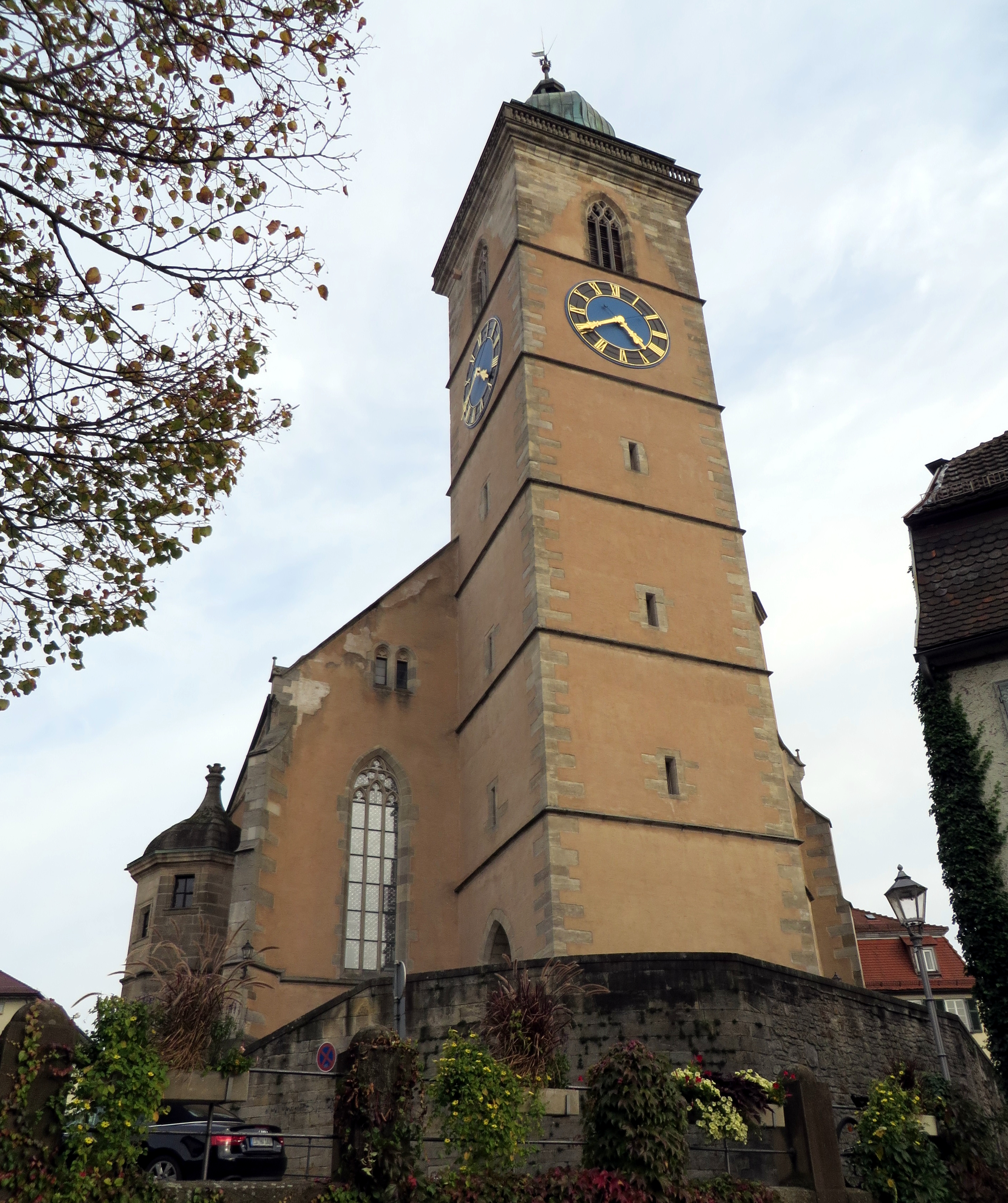
West side of the Church of St. Laurentius

== Mayors since 1819 ==
- 1819–1828: Gottlob Friedrich Schickhardt
- 1828–1846: Heinrich Schickhardt
- 1846–1868: Karl Friedrich Eßig
- 1868–1896: Ferdinand Wilhelm Schmid (1829–1896)
- 1896–1930: Matthäus Baur
- 1930–1939: Hermann Weilenmann
- 1939–1943: Walter Klemm (NSDAP)
- 1943–1945: August Pfänder, temporary (NSDAP) (1891–1971)
- 1945–1948: Hermann Weilenmann
- 1948–1959: August Pfänder
- 1959–1979: Karl Gonser (1914–1991)
- 1979–2004: Alfred Bachofer (Free Voters) (born 1942)
- 2004–2019: Otmar Heirich (SPD) (born 1951)
- since 2019: Johannes Fridrich (born 1977)

== Districts ==
=== Hardt ===
Hardt (929 inhabitants, as of 2012) is the smallest district of Nürtingen. Hardt was first mentioned in 1366 in documents.

=== Neckarhausen ===
Neckarhausen (3,768 inhabitants, as of 2012) is about 2 km from Nürtingen. Neckarhausen was first mentioned in the year 1284. The site is largely dominated by the church and the town hall.

=== Raidwangen ===
Raidwangen (2,115 inhabitants, as of 2014) is about 3 km southwest of Nürtingen and about 1 km from the Neckar. Raidwangen was first mentioned in 1236 in documents.

=== Reudern ===
Reudern (2,707 inhabitants, as of 2012) is located on a hill approximately 3 km east of Nürtingen and was first mentioned in the year 1338.

=== Zizishausen ===
Zizishausen (3,222 inhabitants, as of 2012) is to the left and right of the Neckar and borders to the north directly to the core city of Nürtingen. Zizishausen was first mentioned in 1296.

=== Oberensingen ===
Oberensingen (4,060 inhabitants, 2006) closes immediately northwest of the central city of Nürtingen. The first mention dates back to 1344.

=== Roßdorf ===
Roßdorf lies south of Nürtingen. The district was created in the early 1960s as a model construction project for modern urban planning on the drawing board. Today Roßdorf has around 4,500 inhabitants.

== Local council ==
The local council in Nürtingen has 32 members (until 2014 it had 39 members). The last local elections on 9 June 2024 had following results. The Oberbürgermeister (Mayor) is the president of the council and has one vote.

Parteien und Wählergemeinschaften		% 2024	Sitze 2024	% 2019	Sitze 2019
CDU	Christlich Demokratische Union Deutschlands	26,37	9	17,84	6
NL/GRÜNE	Nürtinger Liste/Grüne	19,18	6	18,69	6
FW	Freie Wähler in Nürtingen	20,64	7	14,35	5
SPD	Sozialdemokratische Partei Deutschlands	13,18	4	12,84	4
NT14	NT 14	13,51	4	14,56	5
FDP	FDP	7,13	2	7,93	2
AB	Aktive Bürger	–	–	7,88	2
FWVO	Freie Wählervereinigung Nürtingen-Oberensingen	–	–	3,76	1
Basis NT	Basis NT	–	–	2,14	1
Gesamt		100	32	100	32
Wahlbeteiligung		57,57 %		55,02 %	

== Twin towns – sister cities ==
Nürtingen is twinned with:

- Oullins, France
- Rhondda Cynon Taf, Wales, United Kingdom
- Soroksár (Budapest), Hungary
- Zerbst, Germany

== Notable people ==
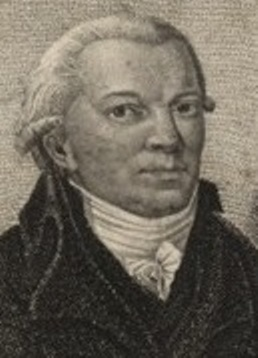
Gottlieb Jakob Planck, c. 1800

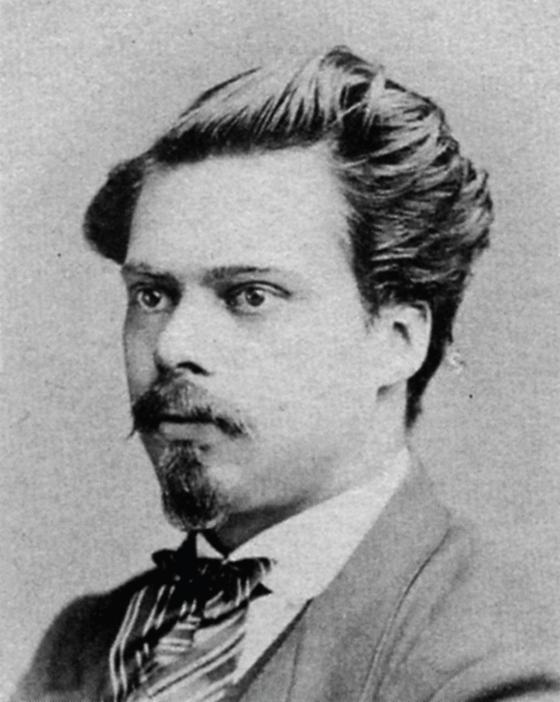
Robert Wiedersheim, 1874

- Elisabeth of Brandenburg, Duchess of Württemberg (1451–1524) a princess of Brandenburg, died locally
- Anna Maria of Brandenburg-Ansbach (1526–1589), princess of Brandenburg-Ansbach, died locally
- Christian Friedrich Duttenhofer, (DE Wiki) (1742–1814), Lutheran pastor
- Gottlieb Jakob Planck (1751–1833), theologian and church historian, great-grandfather of Max Planck.
- Albert Schäffle (1831–1903), scientist and statesman.
- Robert Wiedersheim (1848–1923), physician and anatomist
- Herbert Maisch (1890–1974), theatre director, stage and film director
- Gotthilf Kurz, (DE Wiki) (1923–2010), bookbinder, book artist and graphic artist
- Andreas Deuschle (born 1978), politician (CDU)

=== Sport ===
- Erwin Waldner (1933–2015), footballer, played over 300 games and 13 for West Germany
- Klaus Just (born 1964), 400m. sprinter
- Alois Schwartz (born 1967), football player and manager
- Thomas Brdaric (born 1975), footballer, played 342 games and 8 for Germany
- Wolf Henzler (born 1975), former Porsche factory race car driver
- Hakan Aslantaş (born 1985), a Turkish footballer who played over 270 games
- Christian Gentner (born 1985), footballer, played over 540 games and 5 for Germany
- Dominic Maroh (born 1987), Slovenian footballer, played over 270 games and 7 for Slovenia
- Thomas Gentner (born 1988), footballer, played over 220 games
- Daniel Didavi (born 1990), footballer, played over 250 games
- Pascal Breier (born 1992), footballer, played over 340 games
- Hanna Marie Klek (born 1995), Woman chess Grandmaster (WGM), 2017
- Dang Qiu (born 1996), table tennis player.
- Matthias Jaissle (born 1988), football manager and former player
