= Göppingen (Landtag electoral district) =

State electoral district of Germany

10: Göppingen
- Electoral district for the Landtag of Baden-Württemberg
- Göppingen in 2026
- District: Göppingen (majority) and Esslingen (minority)
- Electorate: 94,643 (2026)
- Major settlements: Adelberg, Birenbach, Börtlingen, Ebersbach an der Fils, Eislingen/Fils, Göppingen, Rechberghausen, Schlierbach, Uhingen, Wäschenbeuren, Wangen, and Reichenbach an der Fils

Current electoral district
- Party: CDU
- Member: Sarah Schweizer

Göppingen is an electoral constituency (German: Wahlkreis) represented in the Landtag of Baden-Württemberg. Since 2026, it has elected one member via first-past-the-post voting. Voters cast a second vote under which additional seats are allocated proportionally state-wide. Under the constituency numbering system, it is designated as constituency 10. It is mostly within the district of Göppingen, but also incorporates part of the district of Esslingen.

== Geography ==
The constituency includes the municipalities of Adelberg, Birenbach, Börtlingen, Ebersbach an der Fils, Eislingen/Fils, Göppingen, Rechberghausen, Schlierbach, Uhingen, Wäschenbeuren, and Wangen, within the district of Göppingen, as well as the municipality of Reichenbach an der Fils of Esslingen.

There were 94,643 eligible voters in 2026.

== Members ==
=== First mandate ===
Both prior to and since the electoral reforms for the 2026 election, the winner of the plurality of the vote (first-past-the-post) in every constituency won the first mandate.

Election	Member	Party	%
1976	Fritz Frey	CDU	
1980	Roman Herzog	CDU	
Oct 1983	Josef Wilhelm Hauser	CDU	
1984	Josef Wilhelm Hauser	CDU	
Aug 1984	Dieter Remppel	CDU	
1988	Dieter Remppel	CDU	
1992	Dieter Remppel	CDU	
1996	Dietrich Birk	CDU	
2001	Dietrich Birk	CDU	
2006	Dietrich Birk	CDU	43.9
2011	Dietrich Birk	CDU	38.0
Jan 2014	Jutta Schiller	CDU	38.0
2016	Alexander Maier	Green	29.1
Jan 2021	Christine Lipp-Wahl	Green	29.1
2021	Ayla Cataltepe	Green	28.8
Dec 2024	Ayla Cataltepe	CDU	28.8
2026	Sarah Schweizer	CDU	38.5

=== Second mandate ===
Prior to the electoral reforms for the 2026 election, the seats in the state parliament were allocated proportionately amongst parties which received more than 5% of valid votes across the state. The seats that were won proportionally for parties that did not win as many first mandates as seats they were entitled to, were allocated to their candidates which received the highest proportion of the vote in their respective constituencies. This meant that following some elections, a constituency would have one or more members elected under a second mandate.

Prior to 2011, these second mandates were allocated to the party candidates who got the greatest number of votes, while from 2011-2021, these were allocated according to percentage share of the vote.

Election	Member	Party	Member	Party
1976	Frieder Birzele	SPD		
1980	Frieder Birzele	SPD		
1984	Frieder Birzele	SPD		
1988	Frieder Birzele	SPD		
1992	Frieder Birzele	SPD	Max Reimann	REP
1996	Frieder Birzele	SPD		
2001	Frieder Birzele	SPD		
2006	Peter Hofelich	SPD		
2011	Peter Hofelich	SPD	Jörg Fritz	Grüne
2016	Peter Hofelich	SPD	Heinrich Fiechtner	AfD
Nov 2017	Peter Hofelich	SPD	Heinrich Fiechtner	IND
2021	Sarah Schweizer	CDU	Hans-Jürgen Goßner	AfD
Apr 2025	Sarah Schweizer	CDU	Sandro Scheer	AfD

== Election results ==
=== 2026 election ===
State election (2026): Göppingen
Notes:	Blue background denotes the winner of the electorate vote. Pink background denotes a candidate elected from their party list. Yellow background denotes an electorate win by a list member, or other incumbent. A ✓ or ✗ denotes status of any incumbent, win or lose respectively.						
Party	Candidate	Votes	%	±%	Party votes	%	±%
CDU	Sarah Schweizer	24,014	38.5	▲12.0	18,801	30.0	▲3.5
AfD	Sandro Scheer	14,405	23.1	▲10.8	14,448	23.1	▲10.7
Greens	Mariska Ott	13,112	21.0	▼7.8	17,015	27.2	▼1.7
SPD	Sabrina Hartmann	5,379	8.6	▼3.7	3,721	5.9	▼6.4
FDP	Peter Körber	2,778	4.5	▼4.5	2,616	4.2	▼4.7
Left	Alexandra Bürger	2,682	4.3	▲2.2	1,986	3.2	▲1.1
FW					1,188	1.9	▼2.2
BSW					924	1.5	
APT					465	0.7	
PARTEI					271	0.4	▼1.1
Volt					262	0.4	▲0.1
dieBasis					229	0.4	▼0.6
Team Todenhöfer					172	0.3	
Pensioners					138	0.2	
Values					134	0.2	
Bündnis C					94	0.2	
ÖDP					83	0.1	▼0.5
Verjüngungsforschung					40	0.1	
Humanists					30	0.0	
PdF					29	0.0	
KlimalisteBW					20	0.0	▼0.7
Informal votes		741			445		
Total valid votes		62,370			62,666		
Turnout		63,111	66.7	▲6.6			
CDU gain from Greens	Majority	9,609	15.4				

=== 2021 election ===
State election (2026): Göppingen
Party	Candidate	Votes	%	±%
Greens	Ayla Cataltepe	16,167	28.8	▼0.3
CDU	Sarah Schweizer	14,846	26.5	▲3.1
AfD	Hans-Jürgen Goßner	6,919	12.3	▼5.1
SPD	Sabrina Hartmann	6,918	12.3	▼2.5
FDP	Heidi Nader	4,998	8.9	▲0.6
FW	Andreas Cerrotta	2,279	4.1	
Left	Joachim Kalitowski	1,168	2.1	Steady
PARTEI	Sebastian Grieb	883	1.6	▲0.8
dieBasis	Elke Krause	556	1.0	
KlimalisteBW	Daniel Wagner	422	0.8	
WiR2020	Sabine Reichert	419	0.7	
ÖDP	Manfred Freiherr von Campenhausen	334	0.6	▲0.1
Volt	Tobias Breyer	193	0.3	
Majority		1,321	2.3	
Rejected ballots		341	0.6	▼0.4
Turnout		56,443	60.0	▼8.5
Registered electors		94,014		
Greens hold		Swing		

== See also ==
- Politics of Baden-Württemberg
- Landtag of Baden-Württemberg
