= Wangen (Göppingen) =

- Municipality
- Coat of arms

- Location of Wangen within Göppingen district
- Interactive map of Wangen
- Location within Germany Location within Baden-Württemberg
- Coordinates: 48°43′46″N 9°36′41″E
- Country: Germany
- State: Baden-Württemberg
- Admin. region: Stuttgart
- District: Göppingen

Government
  - Mayor (2022–30): Mary-Ann Schröder

Area
  - Total: 9.68 km^{2} (3.74 sq mi)
- Elevation: 379 m (1,243 ft)

Population (2025-12-31)
  - Total: 3,174
  - Density: 328/km^{2} (849/sq mi)
- Time zone: UTC+01:00 (CET)
  - Summer (DST): UTC+02:00 (CEST)
- Postal codes: 73117
- Dialling codes: 07161
- Vehicle registration: GP
- Website: www.gemeinde-wangen.de

Wangen (German pronunciation: [ˈvaŋən]) is a village and municipality in the district of Göppingen in Baden-Württemberg, southern Germany. It lies on the edge of the Stuttgart Metropolitan Region.

== Geography ==
Wangen lies on a hill above the Fils Valley, on the edge of the Schurwald and around five kilometres from the county town of Göppingen. The edges of the municipal area border Adelberg to the north, Börtlingen and Rechberghausen to the east, Göppingen to the south, Uhingen to the west and the town of Schorndorf in the neighbouring district of Rems-Murr-Kreis.

The municipality of Wangen includes the formerly independent municipality of Oberwälden, and is composed of the villages of Wangen and Oberwälden. The hamlet of Niederwälden has now been subsumed into the village of Wangen.

== History ==
The village was first recorded in writing in 1274, when Friedrich von Staufeneck sold all his estates in Wangen and Oberwälden to the Abbey of Adelberg. From 1327, the village belonged administratively to the Württemberg State of the Holy Roman Empire, but the majority of property in the village remained under the ownership of the Abbey.

In 1806, the Degenfeld family's fiefdom of Rechberghausen and the Klosteramt (an administrative division centering on the estates of a dissolved monastery) of Adelberg were abolished and the lands transferred to the new Oberamt of Göppingen, which in 1934 was renamed as a Kreis, and in 1938 as an enlarged Landkreis. In 1935, the hamlet of Niederwälden was transferred from the municipality of Holzhausen to that of Wangen. As part of administrative reforms in Baden-Württemberg, the formerly independent municipality of Oberwälden was incorporated into Wangen on 1 July 1971.

=== Religion ===
Wangen was first designated as a parish in 1511, having previously belonged to the parish of Göppingen. In 1557, as part of the Reformation, a Protestant parish was established in the village, and since then there has been no Catholic parish there, Catholics instead attending the parish of Rechberghausen. In addition to this, there is also a small United Methodist community in Wangen.

=== Population ===
Datum	Einwohner
1837	849
1907	1073
17 May 1939	1233
13 September 1950	1863
27 May 1970	2759
31 December 1983	2976
31 December 2005	3213
31 December 2010	3165
30 September 2020	3236

== Politics ==
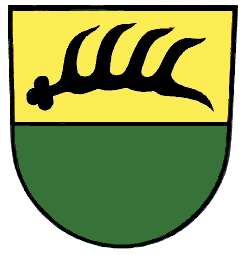

=== Heraldry ===
Blazon: Per fess Or and vert, chief an attire sable

The green of the village's arms represents the surrounding meadows, while the gold represents the profitable wheat fields, and the antler is for the village's affiliation to the House of Württemberg. The coat of arms was adopted in 1930, and officially granted by the Interior Ministry on 3 July 1959.

=== Partnerships ===
The municipality of Wangen has a limited partnership with the French Region de Routot, to which the municipalities of Bouquetot, Brestot, Étréville, Eturqueraye, Hauville, La Haye Aubree, Le Landin, Rougemontier and Routot belong. The rural community of around 5,500 people lies in Normandy. The partnership was established on 1 May 1992, and since then there has been an annual meeting of representatives of the communities.

=== Council ===
There have traditionally been no parties or factions in the municipal council of Wangen. It is not possible under the electoral rules to put forward a list containing more candidates than there are seats available. The candidates therefore traditionally put forward to lists - Free Voters and Independent Voters' Association - in order to be able to carry out a proper election.

== Economy and infrastructure ==
There is one primary school in the village, while higher schools are available in neighbouring towns and villages. The village also contains three nursery schools, two community nurseries and a Catholic nursery.

== Culture and sightseeing ==
=== Music ===
The Musikverein Wangen e. V. (Wangen Musical Society) was established in 1951 and runs a concert band. The society plays an active role in the life of the community through its work in both spiritual and secular events. The society is also heavily involved in youth work through its youth bands.

=== Architecture ===
In the village of Oberwälden is the Nikolauskirche (Church of St. Nicholas), the choir room of which contains some precious frescos.
