= Wäschenbeuren =

- Municipality
- Coat of arms

- Location of Wäschenbeuren within Göppingen district
- Interactive map of Wäschenbeuren
- Location within Germany Location within Baden-Württemberg
- Coordinates: 48°45′37″N 9°41′17″E
- Country: Germany
- State: Baden-Württemberg
- Admin. region: Stuttgart
- District: Göppingen

Government
  - Mayor (2024–32): Steven Hagenlocher

Area
  - Total: 12.95 km^{2} (5.00 sq mi)
- Elevation: 442 m (1,450 ft)

Population (2025-12-31)
  - Total: 3,916
  - Density: 302.4/km^{2} (783.2/sq mi)
- Time zone: UTC+01:00 (CET)
  - Summer (DST): UTC+02:00 (CEST)
- Postal codes: 73116
- Dialling codes: 07172
- Vehicle registration: GP
- Website: www.waeschenbeuren.de

Wäschenbeuren is a town in the district of Göppingen in Baden-Württemberg in southern Germany.

== Geography ==
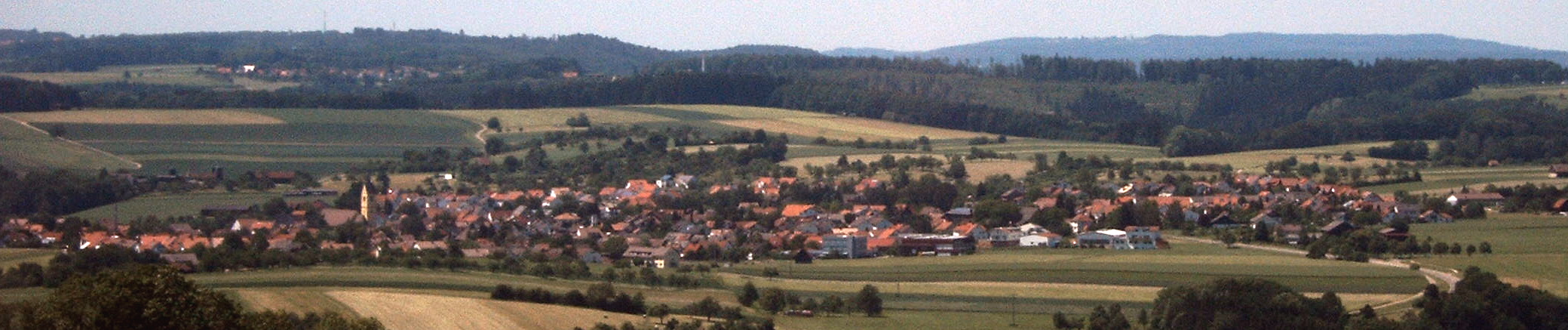
Panorama of Wäschenbeuren

=== Location ===
Wäschenbeuren is located on the edge of the Schurwald, at the Hohenstaufen, between the Filstal valley and the Remstal valley, some 10 kilometers northern of the district city of Göppingen.

Wäschenbeuren in Göppingen district

=== Towns and Municipalities of the Neighborhood ===
In the North, the municipality borders the towns of Lorch and Schwäbisch Gmünd, district of Ostalbkreis, at the East and in the South, it borders to the district city of Göppingen and in the West, it borders to Birenbach and Börtlingen.

=== Organization of the Municipality ===
The rural community of Wäschenbeuren are the villages of Krettenhof, Linderbronn and Wäscherhof, and belong to the municipality of Wäschenbeuren, so do the farm Beutenmühle and the single houses Schützenhof (also to Birenbach), the tile manufacture and furthermore, the abandoned village of Holzweiler.

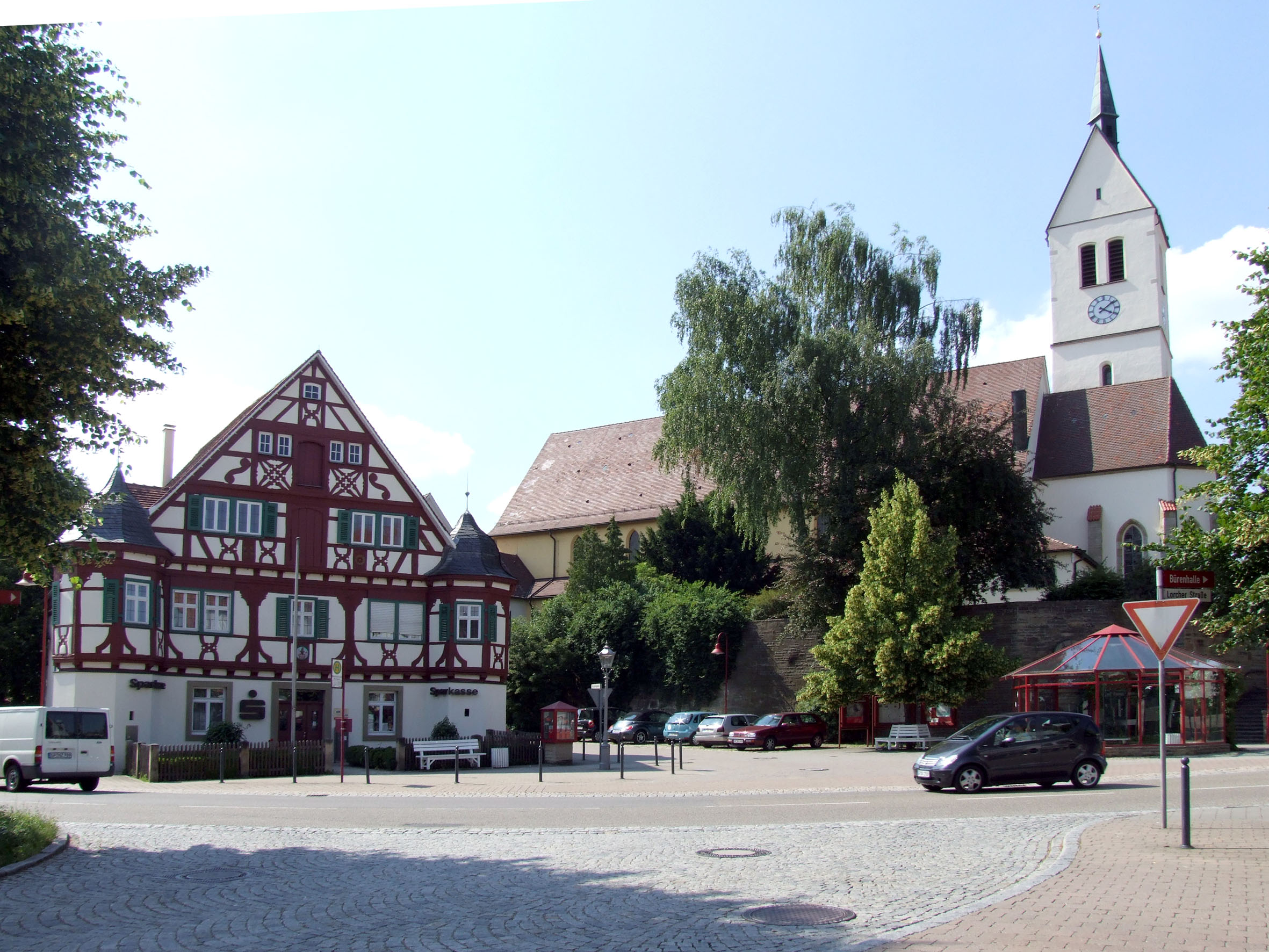
Church and district office (Amtshaus)Wäschenbeuren

== History ==
Evolution of the population

Inhabitants of the municipality since 1837 :

Date	1837	1907	17 May 1939	13 September 1950	27 May 1970	31 December 1983	31 December 2005
Inhabitants	1,243	1,469	1,764	1,988	2,584	2,738	3,952

== Policy ==
Coat of Arms

The coat of arms is a 'talking one', showing a laundress on a red-white-green background. It was given to the municipality on April 14, 1491.

== Economy and infrastructure ==
Transportation Wäschenbeuren is located on the primary road 297, from Göppingen to Lorch. Several ùotor-bus lines connect the municipality to neighboring cities and municipalities :

Line 11 : Göppingen – Bartenbach – Rechberghausen – Birenbach – Wäschenbeuren – Schwäbisch Gmünd

Line 11a : Göppingen – Bartenbach – Rechberghausen – Birenbach – Wäschenbeuren – Maitis

line 12 : Göppingen – Faurndau – Rechberghausen – Birenbach – Wäschenbeuren – Maitis – Lenglingen – Schwäbisch Gmünd

The motor-busses of the company Omnibusverkehr Göppingen circulate from 5 AM to 11 PM, at a rate of approx. one an hour and more often during main business time. There are less opportunities towards Lorch and Schwäbisch Gmünd. Railroad connections are located at the station Bahnhof Göttingen for the Fils Valley Railway Stuttgart - Ulm, and in Lorch or Lorch-Waldhausen, for the Remsbahn railway Stuttgart - Aalen. The former 'Hohenstaufen' railway Hohenstaufenbahn, well known in the last decades as the 'Josefle' - the little Joseph - rolling from Schwäbisch Gmünd to Göppingen, was stopped operating by 1984.

== Formation ==
With the Stauferschule, Wäschenbeurer has an Elementary school and a General school (Hauptschule)including a Werkrealschule, a specific sort of a general school in Baden Württemberg, with a tenth school-year for volunteers. Other leading schools are available in the surrounding vicinities : Realschule at Rechberghausen and colleges at Göppingen and Lorch, very well connected through public transportation means.

== Other landmarks ==
- The 2006 completed nursing home is located in the center of the vicinity. It is administrated by the Foundation Stiftung Haus Lindenhof. It is named Cardinal Walter Kasper who lived here in the old schoolhouse during his youth, from 1938 to 1946.
- Next to the Catholic Church, you can find the home for the catholic youth : Katholische junge Gemeinde of Wäschenbeuren. Beyond some movies evenings or feasts, that home is the main meeting point of the local youth.
- The municipality hall is called 'Bürenhalle'. It was completed by 2002 and is located abreast to the Stauferschule.

== Education and culture ==
=== Museums ===
The castle named Schloss Wäscherburg is located in the area called Wäscherhof. It shelters an interesting collection on the subject : History of the House of Hohenstaufen.

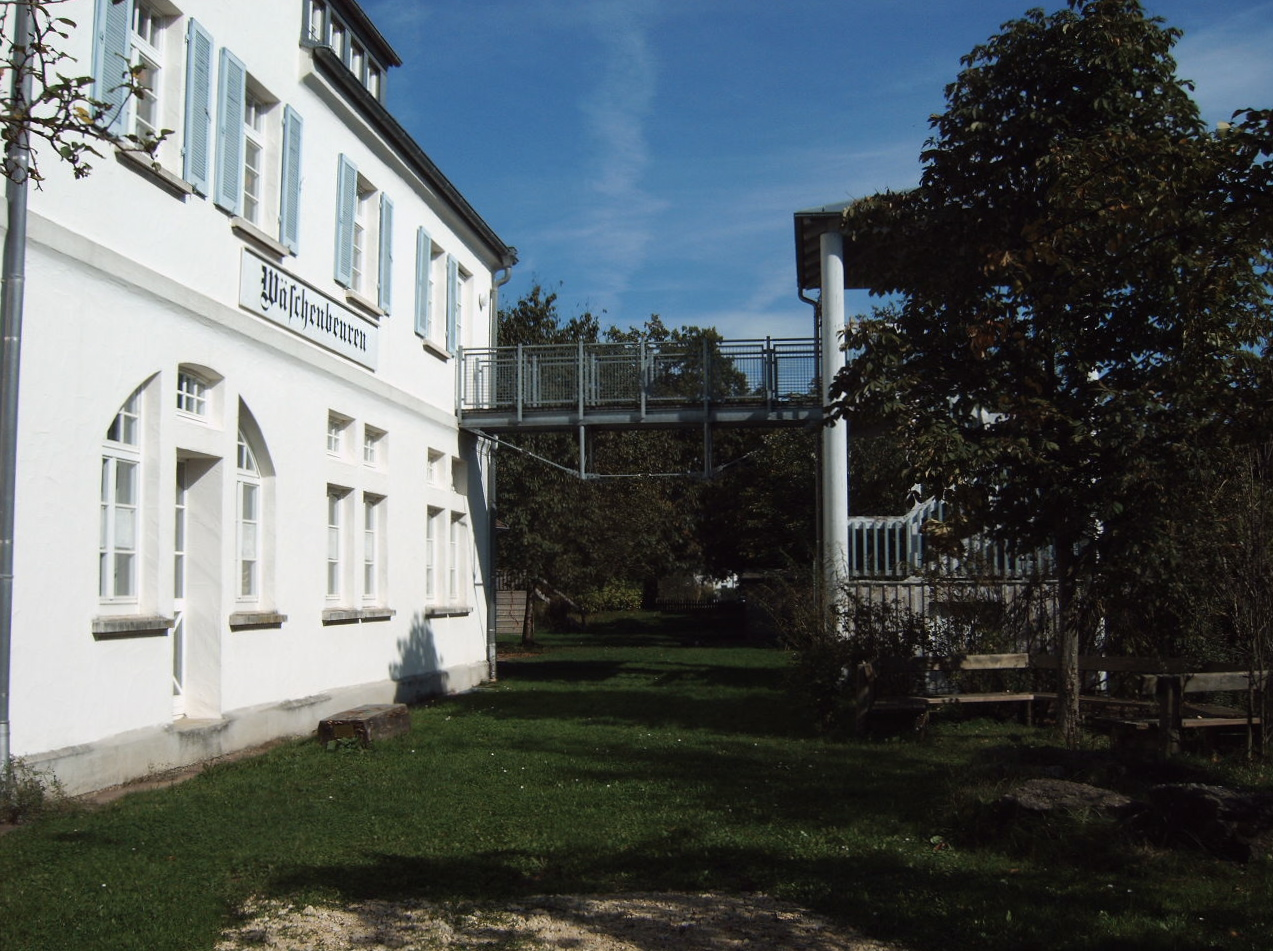
Former railroad station

=== Buildings ===
Near the castle Wäscherburg, you find the Catholic Church with its nave, so as the former railroad station, nowadays fitted up as a kinder garden; both are worth a visit. In the center, you may also have a look at the Amtshaus - the administration hall. On the Burren in the North of the locality, you will find the remnants of a middle-age flatland castle (Niederungsburg)

== Notable inhabitants ==
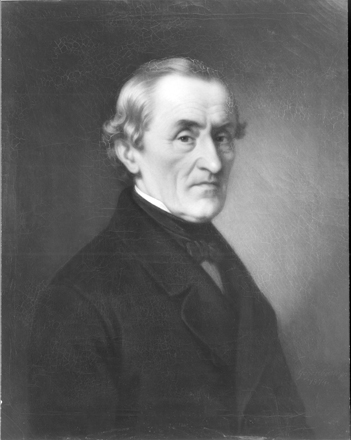
Johannes von Kuhn 1874

- Johannes von Kuhn (1806–1887), Catholic theologian, born in Wäschenbeuren.
- Bernhard Kaiser (1834–1918), teacher and an author
- Manfred Wörner (1934–1994), former Federal Ministry of Defense and former Secretary General of NATO - lived in Wäschenbeuren since 1973, at Wäscherhof; honorary citizen since 1994
