= Adelberg =

- Municipality
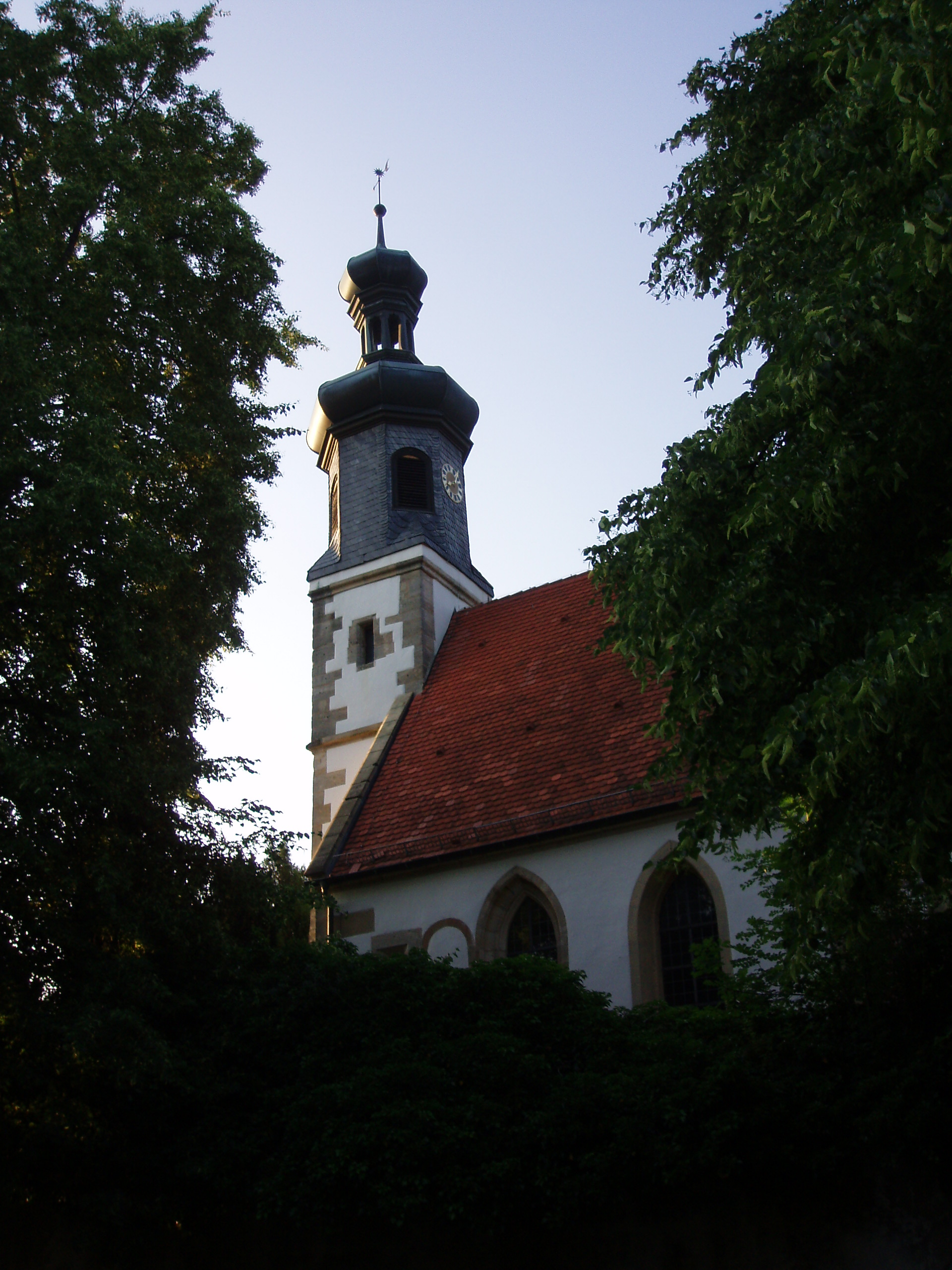
- Church

- Coat of arms

- Location of Adelberg within Göppingen district
- Interactive map of Adelberg
- Location within Germany Location within Baden-Württemberg
- Coordinates: 48°45′43″N 9°35′59″E
- Country: Germany
- State: Baden-Württemberg
- Admin. region: Stuttgart
- District: Göppingen

Government
  - Mayor (2018–26): Carmen Marquardt

Area
  - Total: 9.49 km^{2} (3.66 sq mi)
- Elevation: 472 m (1,549 ft)

Population (2025-12-31)
  - Total: 1,954
  - Density: 206/km^{2} (533/sq mi)
- Time zone: UTC+01:00 (CET)
  - Summer (DST): UTC+02:00 (CEST)
- Postal codes: 73099
- Dialling codes: 07166
- Vehicle registration: GP
- Website: www.adelberg.de

Adelberg (German pronunciation: [ˈaːdl̩ˌbɛʁk]) is a municipality in the district of Göppingen in Baden-Württemberg in southern Germany.

== Geography ==
Adelberg lies in the Schurwald forest, at an altitude of around 334 to 473m.

=== Climate ===
The annual rainfall of 1045mm is within the top quarter of values recorded in Germany, with lower values registered in 87% of the country's weather stations. The driest month is February, while the most rainfall comes in June, with almost double the rainfall of February. Variability of precipitation is extremely strong, and only 18% of weather stations record higher seasonal variations.

=== Local subdivisions ===
The municipality of Adelberg is made up of the village of Adelberg, the neighbouring hamlet of Adelberg Abbey, and the houses, Herrenmühle, Mittelmühle and Zachersmühle. In 1971, the hamlet of Nassach was transferred to the municipality of Uhingen.

== History ==
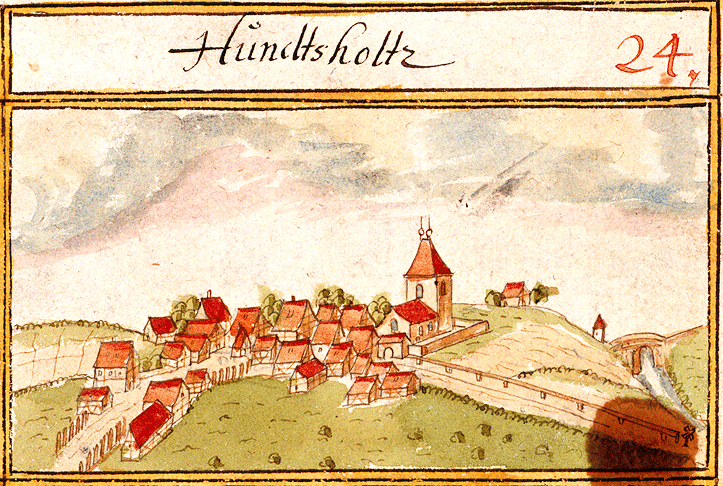
Hundsholz, 1685

The site on which Adelberg now stands was originally occupied by the village of Hundsholz (Dogwood), which is the source of the leaping dog on Adelberg's coat of arms. In 1178, Volknand von Staufen founded the Abbey of Adelberg, and gifted to it a part of the village of Hundsholz. After the demise of the von Staufens, both abbey and town came under the control of Württemberg, a State of the Holy Roman Empire. During the Reformation, Adelberg became a Klosteramt (an administrative division centering on the estates of a dissolved monastery), consisting of the former Abbey and the village of Hundsholz. In 1556, the monastery, along with twelve others in the region, were transformed into Protestant grammar schools under the direction of Christoph Binder. The school in Adelberg served this purpose until 1648, its most famous pupil being mathematician and astronomer Johannes Kepler (1584–1586). In 1807, the Klosteramt was subsumed into the larger administrative district, Oberamt of Schorndorf. In 1830, the village of Hundsholz bought out the property in the village which had previously belonged to the monastery, and the monastery itself. In 1843, the area of the monastery was formally incorporated into the village, which was renamed as Adelberg. The administrative reform of 1938 brought the municipality within the district of Göppingen. After the Second World War, the population rose steeply through the return of former expatriates.

=== Adelberg Abbey ===
In 1054, a small chapel was built on the site on which the abbey now stands. The monastery was itself established in 1178 by the Premonstratensian canons of Roggenburg Abbey, and it came under the direct protection of Frederick I, Holy Roman Emperor by a charter of 1181. In the charter the emperor established that Adelberg Abbey would have no other advocate than the lord of Hohenstaufen. Also, the charter required that the prior of the abbey give a gold coin to the Holy See as a sign that the abbey must be protected and defended by the Pope.

The first church in the village of Hundsholz was built in the 1490s. With the introduction of the Reformation by Ulrich, Duke of Württemberg, the monastery was dissolved.

=== Population ===
Date	Population
1525	250
1721	350
1769	403
1851	850
1907	808
1912	705
17 May 1939	761
1946	1112
13 September 1950	1223
27 May 1970	1505
31 December 1983	1646
31 December 2000	2041
31 December 2005	2044

== Politics ==
Abensberg and the neighbouring municipalities of Birenbach, Börtlingen und Rechberghausen form the Gemeindeverwaltungsverband (joint administrative union) of Eastern Schurwald. A Gemeindeverwaltungsverband (GVV) is a voluntary association of municipalities within the same administrative district which pool their resources and public services in order to save money.

=== Mayor ===
The Mayor of Adelberg is Wolf-Dieter Hermann, who will be succeeded in June 2010 by Carmen Marquardt, who won 60.7% of the vote in the election on 15 March 2010.

=== Town council ===
Local elections were held on 7 June 2009 and ten members from a single list of candidates were elected. The most votes were received by Robert Tischer. The election turnout was 54%, 0.6% lower than in the 2004 municipal elections. The council consists of eight men and two women.

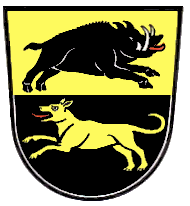

=== Heraldry ===
Blazon: Per fess Or and sable, a boar courant contourny and a dog courant counterchanged

The boar of the town's coat of arms is taken from the arms of the former Abbey of Adelberg, while the dog is a reference to the former name of the village, Hundsholz (literally, Dogwood). The village's colours are black and yellow.

The coat of arms and flag were officially conferred on 7 April 1959.

=== Twin towns ===
Adelberg is twinned with Lichtensteig in the Canton of St. Gallen, Switzerland.

== Economy and infrastructure ==
Adelberg is part of the border zone of the Stuttgart Metropolitan Region. It is the location of the headquarters of ERNI Electronics.

=== Transport ===
Adelberg is connected by the Landesstraße 1147 to nearby Rechberghausen and to Oberberken, part of the municipality of Schorndorf. The No. 260 Bus (Göppingen–Schorndorf), run by Regional Bus Stuttgart, part of Deutsche Bahn, runs through Adelberg. Between 1912 and 1962, the Hohenstaufen railway serviced the Adelberg-Börtlingen railway station, around four kilometres from the town.

=== Education ===
The town itself contains a primary school, while higher schools are situated in neighbouring towns.

== Culture and sightseeing ==
=== Architecture ===
- The church within the former Abbey compound contains altar paintings by Bartholomäus Zeitblom.

=== Museums ===
- Museum in der Klostervilla (Museum housed in the monastery house)

=== Regular events ===
- Adelberger History Afternoon
- Open Air Festival in Adelberg Abbey
