= Klosteramt =

A Klosteramt (lit. 'monastery office') was an administrative unit in certain states of the Holy Roman Empire that, after the Reformation in the 16th century, took over the administration of the estates of dissolved monasteries and also their lower court powers. In Old Württemberg the head of the Klosteramt was the prelate (Prälat), a Protestant clergyman appointed by the Duke, who had a seat and vote in the Landtag. The administrative business was managed by the monastery reeve (Klostervogt) or steward (Hofmeister), who from 1759 held the title of Klosteroberamtmann.

The Klosteramts were dissolved after the Napoleonic Wars at the beginning of the 19th century in the course of the subsequent reorganization of states like the Kingdom of Württemberg.

== List of Klosteramts in Württemberg ==
The following Klosteramts are recorded:

- Adelberg
- Alpirsbach
- Anhausen
- Bebenhausen
- Blaubeuren
- Denkendorf
- Herbrechtingen
- Herrenalb
- Hirsau
- Königsbronn
- Lichtenstern (nunnery, no prelate)
- Lorch
- Maulbronn
- Murrhardt
- Reichenbach (Klosterreichenbach), Baiersbronn municipality, in the Freudenstadt district, Baden-Württemberg
- St. Georgen

The poorer monasteries had administrative units called a Klosterhofmeisterei or Stiftsverwaltung. They were not represented in the state parliament.

== Literature ==
- Erwin Hölzle: Der deutsche Südwesten am Ende des alten Reiches, Stuttgart 1938, S. 30ff.
- Hans-Martin Maurer: Altwürttembergisches Archiv (A-Bestände). Kohlhammer, Stuttgart 1975, ISBN 3-17-002175-3, S. 160 (Veröffentlichungen der Staatlichen Archivverwaltung Baden-Württemberg, Band 32).
