= Alfdorf =

German municipality

- Municipality
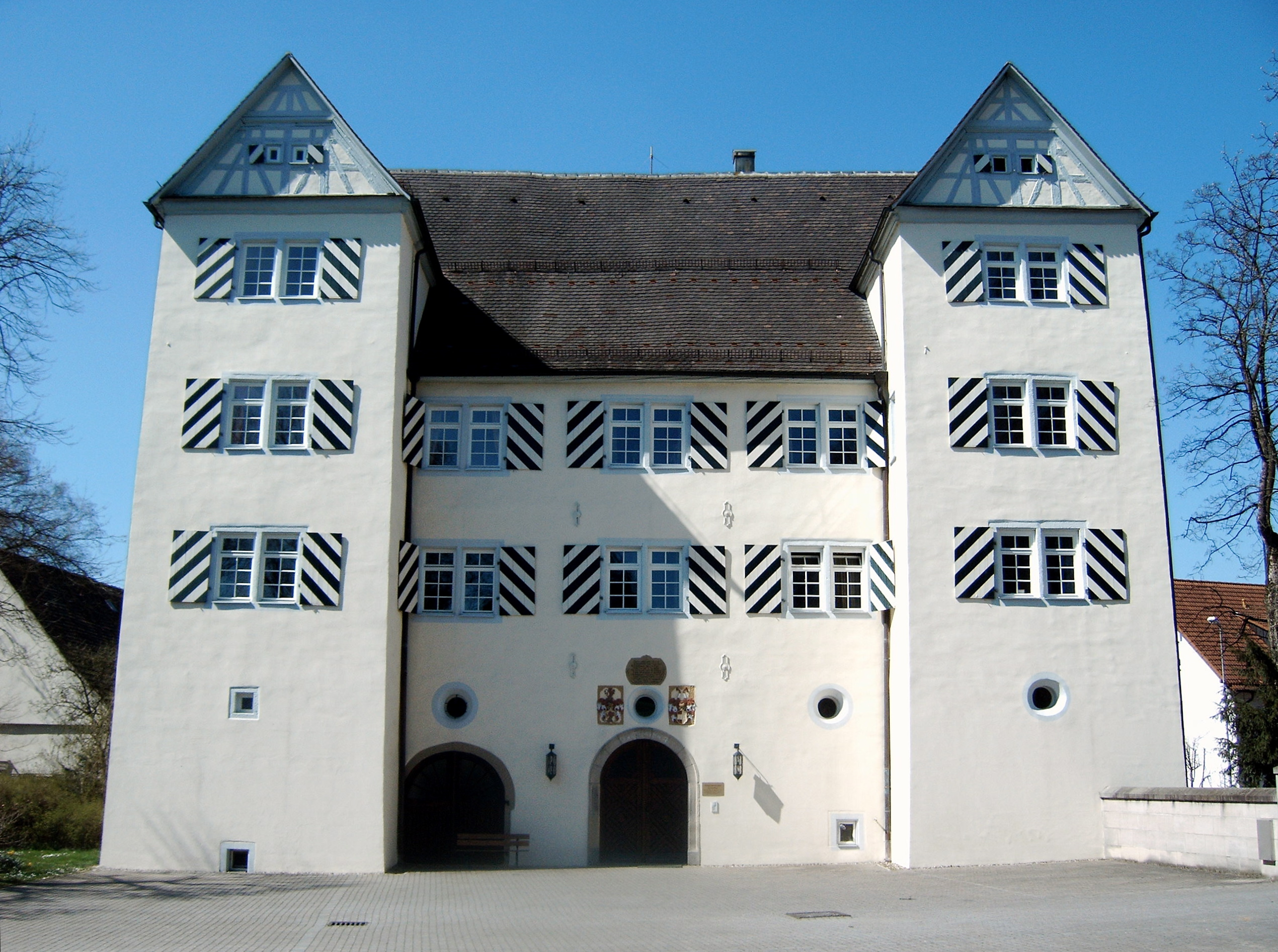
- Altdorf Town Hall

- Coat of arms

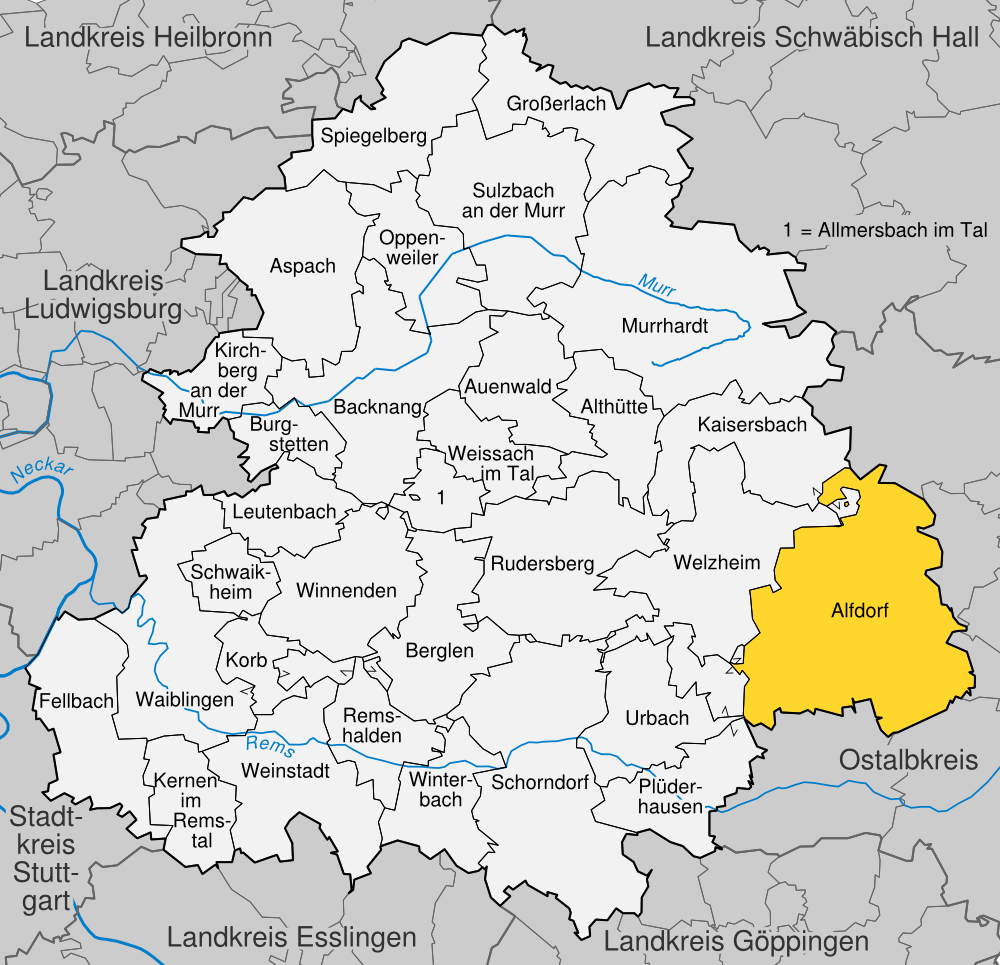
- Location of Alfdorf within Rems-Murr-Kreis district
- Interactive map of Alfdorf
- Location within Germany Location within Baden-Württemberg
- Coordinates: 48°50′43″N 9°43′09″E
- Country: Germany
- State: Baden-Württemberg
- Admin. region: Stuttgart
- District: Rems-Murr-Kreis

Area
  - Total: 68.52 km^{2} (26.46 sq mi)
- Elevation: 487 m (1,598 ft)

Population (2025-12-31)
  - Total: 7,237
  - Density: 105.6/km^{2} (273.6/sq mi)
- Time zone: UTC+01:00 (CET)
  - Summer (DST): UTC+02:00 (CEST)
- Postal codes: 73553
- Dialling codes: 07172
- Vehicle registration: WN
- Website: www.alfdorf.de

Alfdorf is a municipality in the Rems-Murr district of Baden-Württemberg, Germany.

== History ==
The municipality of Alfdorf was formed in 1972 by the merging of the municipalities of Alfdorf, Pfahlbronn, and Vordersteinenberg.

== Geography ==
The municipality (Gemeinde) of Alfdorf lies at the easternmost extremity of the Rems-Murr district, along its border with the Ostalb district. Alfdorf is physically located in the Schurwald and Welzheim Forest, regions of the larger Swabian-Franconian Forest. Elevation above sea level in the municipal area ranges from a high of 566 meters (1,857 ft) Normalnull (NN) to a low of 307 meters (1,007 ft) NN.

Portions of the Federally protected Lein river valley between Leinecksee and Leinhäusle, Rottal zwischen Hüttenbühl und Buchengehren, and Wiesentäler bei der Menzlesmühle nature reserves are located in Alfdorf's municipal area.

== Politics ==
Alfdorf has three boroughs (Ortsteile), Alfdorf, Pfahlbronn, and Vordersteinenberg, and 64 villages. The abandoned villages of Eisenmühle, Felgensägmühle, Geiersweiler, Geren, Tierbad, and Webersgehren are found in the municipal area.

=== Coat of arms ===
Alfdorf's municipal coat of arms displays a blue lily with a beech bundle and an oak acorn, in green, growing on a green, three-pointed hill in front of a black fence with four posts upon a field of yellow. The lily is a motif of Alfdorf dated to as early as 1550, which occasionally sported additional acorns. The fence refers to Pfahlbronn and the hill Vordersteinenberg. This coat of arms was awarded to Alfdorf with a municipal flag by the Rems-Murr district office on 19 May 1980.

== Transportation ==
Alfdorf is connected to Germany's network of roadways by the Bundesautobahn 7, Bundesstraße 14, and Bundesstraße 29. Local public transportation is provided by the Verkehrs- und Tarifverbund Stuttgart and OstalbMobil.
