= Alfdorf Manor =

17th century manor in Germany

- Oberes Schloss
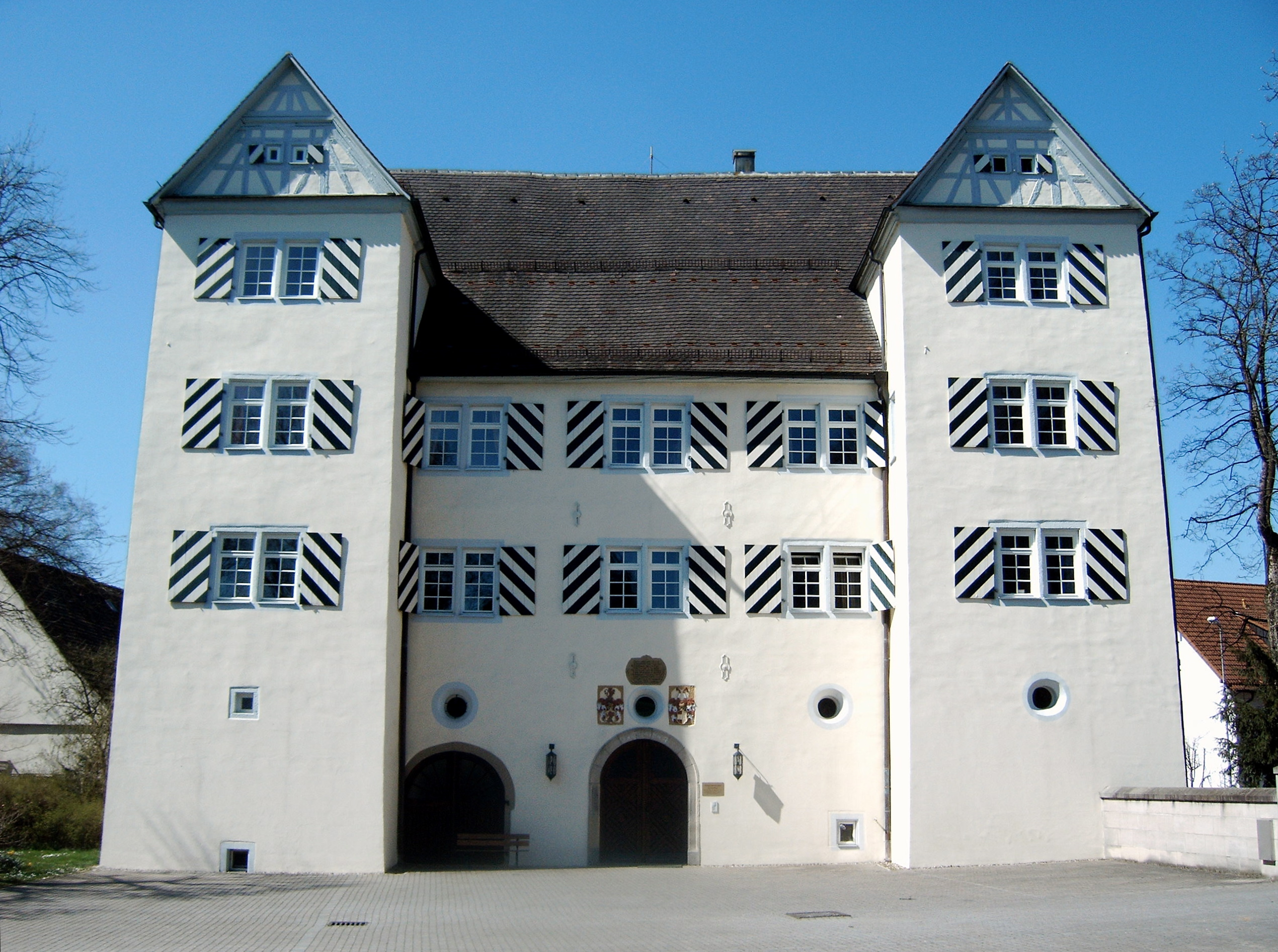
- Alfdorf Manor and Town Hall

- Location within Baden-Württemberg Alfdorf Manor (Germany)

General information
- Location: Alfdorf, Germany
- Coordinates: 48°50′39.5″N 9°43′16.7″E

Alfdorf Manor, called the Oberes Schloss, is a 17th century schloss located in Alfdorf, Germany, and its town hall.

== History ==
Alfdorf Manor was built in 1602 by Philipp von Neuhausen and his brother-in-law Joachim Berchthold von Roth. Neuhausen's share of the castle was bought by John Frederick, Duke of Württemberg, as early as 1614. From 1618 to 1630, the manor was enfeoffed to Hans Caspar Diemar. On 14 April 1640, the castle was sold to Georg Friedrich vom Holtz zu Niederholz by Eberhard III, Duke of Württemberg. A half-timber brewery was built to the west of the manor in 1775 and stood there until around 1864.

The manor was renovated in 1845 and in 1871 passed into the ownership of Baron Götz von Holtz and his wife Sophie von Gemmingen.

Alfdorf Manor became Alfdorf's town hall in 1986.

== Architecture ==
The manor has a rectangular plan and stands three stories tall with two four-story towers abutting the main structure. Both features share a single gabled roof. A risalit on the west facade houses a staircase.

Above the main entrance into the manor, on the east side of the building, are the coats of arms of the manor's builders in relief.
