= Lorch (Württemberg) =

Place in Baden-Württemberg, Germany

- Town
- Coat of arms

- Location of Lorch within Ostalbkreis district
- Interactive map of Lorch
- Location within Germany Location within Baden-Württemberg
- Coordinates: 48°47′54″N 09°41′18″E
- Country: Germany
- State: Baden-Württemberg
- Admin. region: Stuttgart
- District: Ostalbkreis
- Subdivisions: 4 Stadtteile

Government
  - Mayor: Marita Funk

Area
  - Total: 34.28 km^{2} (13.24 sq mi)
- Elevation: 288 m (945 ft)

Population (2025-12-31)
  - Total: 10,704
  - Density: 312.3/km^{2} (808.7/sq mi)
- Time zone: UTC+01:00 (CET)
  - Summer (DST): UTC+02:00 (CEST)
- Postal codes: 73547
- Dialling codes: 07172
- Vehicle registration: AA, GD
- Website: www.stadt-lorch.de

Lorch (German pronunciation: [lɔʁç]; Swabian: Lorich) is a small town in the Ostalbkreis district, in Baden-Württemberg, Germany, by the river Rems, 8 kilometers west of Schwäbisch Gmünd. It is a part of the Ostwürttemberg region.

== Geography ==
Lorch lies in a valley of the river Rems, a tributary of the river Neckar, with Schwäbisch Gmünd to its east, Schorndorf to its west, the Swabian-Franconian Forest to its north and the Swabian Alps to its south. Lorch is part of the Swabian-Franconian Forest Nature Park and is located at the Limes hiking route (HW 6) of the Swabian Alp Association.

In addition to Schwäbisch Gmünd, the town also borders the municipality of Alfdorf to the north, the municipalities of Wäschenbeuren and Börtlingen to the south as well as the municipality of Plüderhausen to the west.

Lorch, with the formerly independent municipality of Waldhausen, encompasses 35 hamlets, villages and farms in addition to Lorch itself. In accordance with the borders drawn at 31 December 1971, Lorch, the Weiler Bruck, Klotzenhof, Metzelhof, Oberkirneck, Schnellhöfle, Stauben and Unterkirneck, the farmlands of Hetzenhof, Maierhof im Remstal, Reichenhof, Sägreinhof, Schafhaus, Schwefelhütte, Trudelhöfle and Ziegelhütte as well as the Brucker Sägmühle, Edenhof, Götzenmühle, Hohenlinde, Hollenhof, Kloster Lorch, Muckensee, Seemühle, Wachthaus and the Walkersbacher Tal make up the territory of the Town Lorch.

As of 2012, Lorch has been divided into 5 boroughs: Kirneck (396 inhabitants), Lorch (6492 inhabitants), Rattenharz (251 inhabitants), Waldhausen (2698 inhabitants) and Weitmars (1030 inhabitants).

== History ==
During the Roman Era, it served as a vital link in the Limes Germanicus. The monastery at Lorch was founded by Frederick I of Swabia in 1102.

=== Roman Era ===
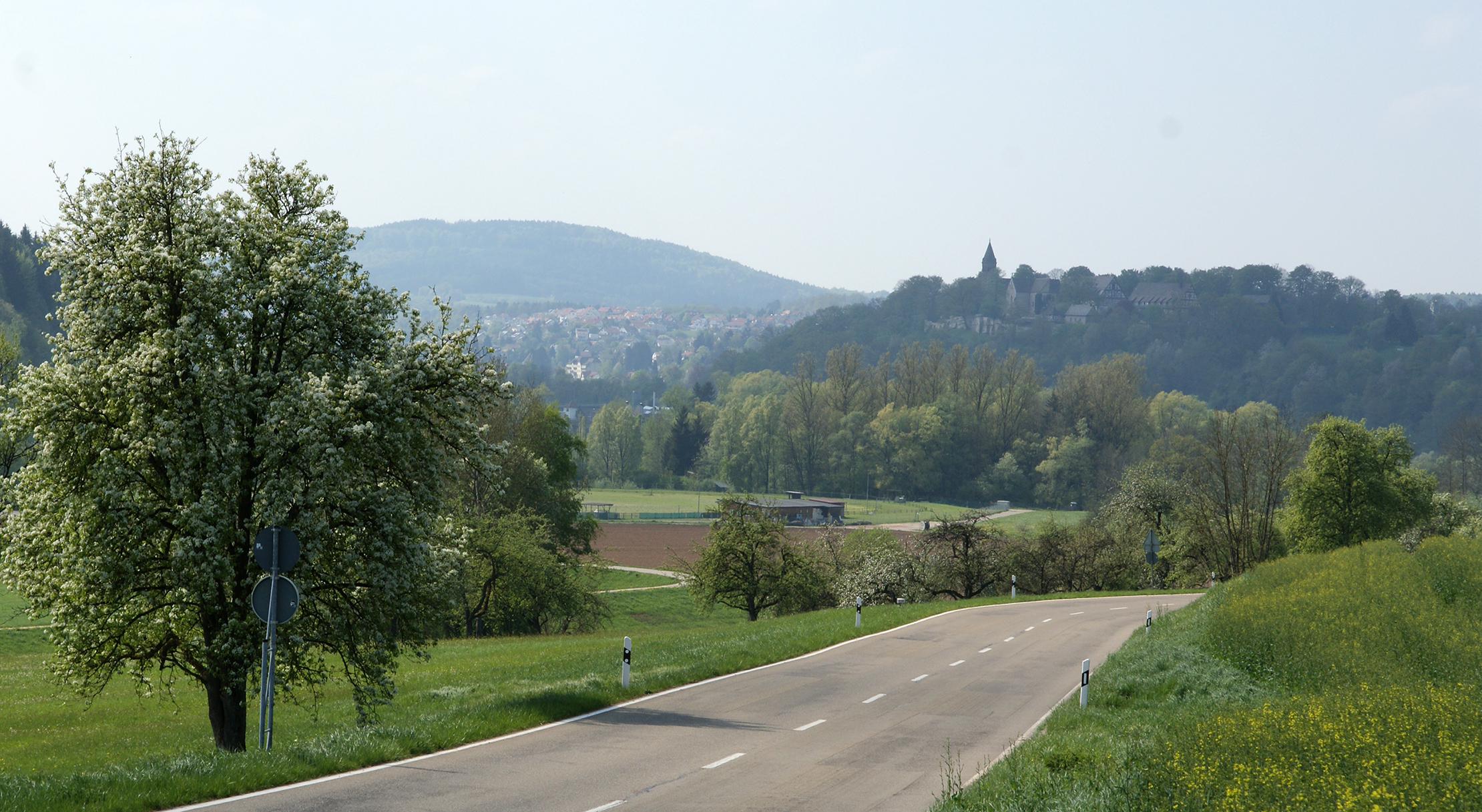
View of Lorch from the East. Steeple and buildings of monastery are visible on hill at right.

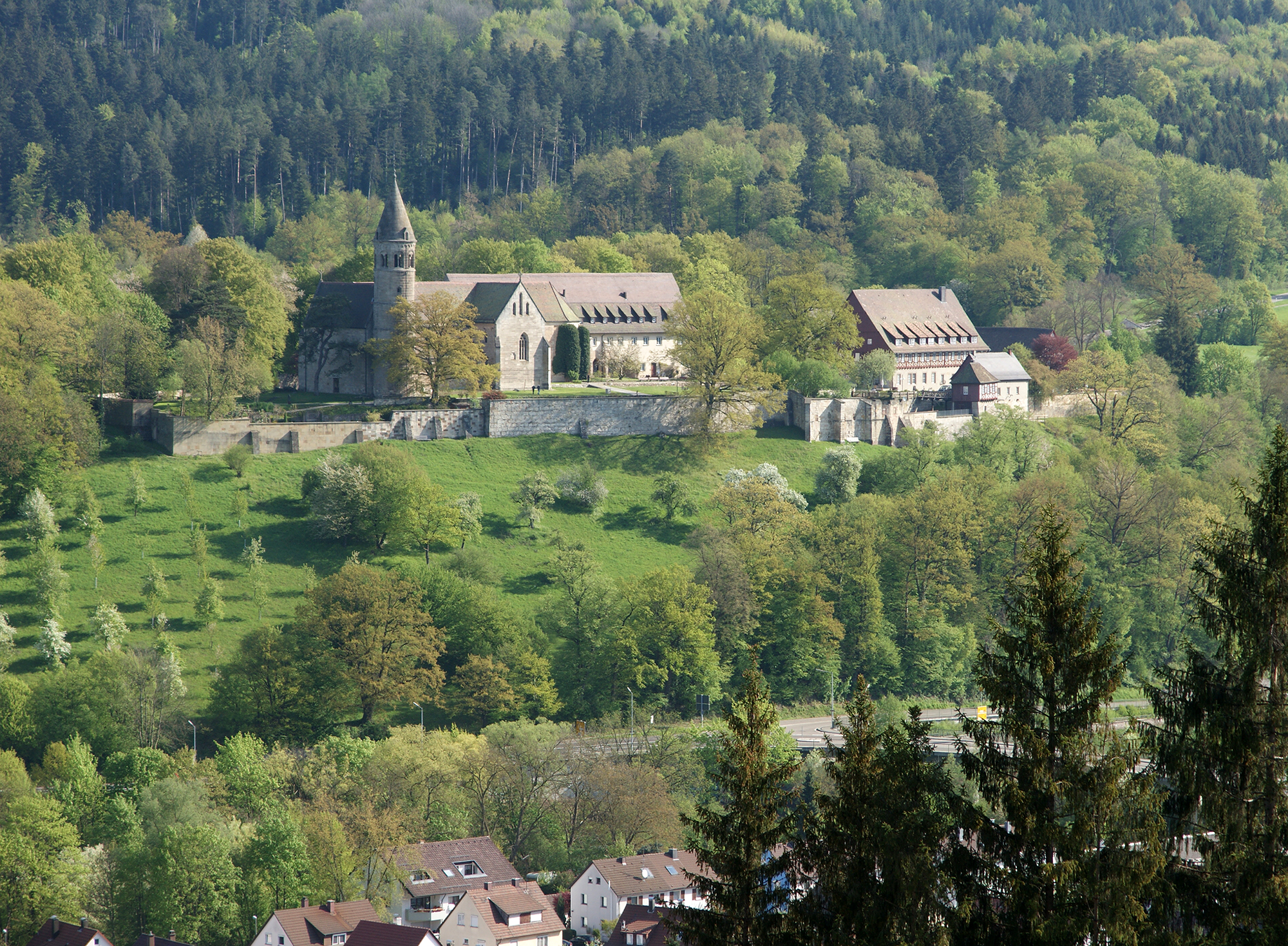
Lorch monastery

The Roman Empire expanded its sphere of control to the north of the Alps into the borders of modern-day Switzerland, southern Germany and Austria under Emperor Augustus in the year 15 B.C. When they advanced past the Danube and Rhine rivers about 100 years later, they took control of the so-called "Dekumatenland," which included the territory of modern-day Lorch. Over the following decades, this new border was secured and became a heavily guarded area, resulting in the creation of the Upper Germanic-Rhaetian Limes. The new Limes lines met in what is called a "Limesknie" ("bend — literally, 'knee' — in the fortified Roman border") between modern-day Lorch and Schwäbisch Gmünd.

During the reign of Emperor Antoninus Pius (138-161 A.D.), the fort of Lorch was established as a cohort fort in order to secure the Limes. This fort was the southernmost fort of this Limes with the Rhaetian Limes to its east. Its centre was located in what is now the yard of the town's Protestant church and its sides were approximately 150 to 160 meters long. A civilian settlement (vicus), which stretched on for about one kilometre at its largest point, was connected to the fort along the Roman arterial road running through the Remstal. The then-strategically important road ran from Augsburg (Augusta Vindelicorum) through modern-day Stuttgart-Bad Cannstatt to Mainz (Mogontiacum).

The Roman name of what would later be Lorch is uncertain, though Lauriacum is commonly suggested due to its usage during medieval times as well as the existence of an Austrian town of the same name that is known to have been referred to as such.

Both the region and the fort were abandoned between 260 and 268 A.D. as the Roman frontier retreated due to pressure from the Alemanni. After the Romans departed, the Alemanni settled the region themselves.

=== Middle Ages ===
Not much is known about the area's history during the medieval period and it remains unclear whether it was continuously inhabited at all. During the mid-11th century, a "Kollegiatstift", a collegial chapter, was founded at the parish church located in the village of Lorch, where the ancestors of the Staufer family were laid to rest.

Around 1100, the monastery of Lorch was donated by the Staufers as a Benedictine abbey, meant to serve as the family's home monastery. It was founded upon a local mountain which may have held a castle, though the sources claiming such are unverified. From then on, the monastery dominated the goings ons of the town. Conrad III eventually had his ancestors' remains, still buried at the local graveyard, relocated to the monastery.

During the 12th century, the town is mentioned in various documents under the name of both Lorchia and Lorche, as well as the Latin Laureacus, with the monastery referred to as Laureacum monasterium.

The Lorch monastery came to be a part of the bailiwick of the Counts of Württemberg in the 13th century and the collegial chapter was abolished during the second half of the 14th century. Towards the end of the Middle Ages, the town had gained the "Marktrecht", literally market right—the right to hold a weekly or annual market—and had a court as well as a bath house.

=== Modern period ===
Duke Ulrich introduced the Reformation in Lorch in 1535. As a result of the Schmalkaldic War, in 1548 Catholic forms of worship were temporarily reintroduced, though Protestant pastors were not reinstated until 1553. The Reformation also resulted in the foundation of a school, which received its own dedicated building in 1560. Sometime during the 16th century, the monastery was also abolished.

The Thirty Years' War reduced the local population by two thirds. During the following decades a lively reconstruction began and in 1660 the city regained its right to hold two fairs, which it had lost prior to the war. From 1810 to 1819 Lorch was the registered office of an "Oberamt", which was then transferred to Welzheim. In 1831 and 1832 the town received permission for another two markets.

With the opening of the Bad Cannstatt-Wasseralfingen section of the Rems Railway in 1861, tourism gained economic importance in Lorch. Accommodation options were built and renovated. Lorch was finally awarded the title of City by King Karl on the 22nd of June 1865. In addition to efforts from the city council, a "Verschönerungsclub" (literally: embellishment or beautification club) promoted tourism and Lorch became a popular health resort. For the year of 1898, 464 spa visitors were recorded, amongst which were 64 foreigners.

At the same time, industrial enterprises were founded, amongst them the pasta factory "Gebrüder Daiber", founded in 1876, which by 1904 employed 125 people, making it the most important local employer. In 1893 it also became the first company in Lorch to make use of electricity, which it generated itself and which was passed on to the surrounding private homes.

=== National Socialist period ===
In the early 1930s, the Nazi Party was able to count well above average election results in Lorch and Waldhausen. At the 1933 elections, it received 56,5% of votes in Lorch, compared to the 41,9% the party received in the state Wüttemberg and the 43,9% it received in total. A possible reason for these results is the high unemployment rate, caused by the Daiber factory, still the city's largest employer, closing down due to a fire a few years prior. None of the local NSDAP group's founders was an employee, however, the local party being carried by middle-class families, under the Ortsgruppenleiter Hermann E. Sieger, a local stamp salesman.

As a result of the Gleichschaltung, the number of people on the community council was reduced from 16 to 10. During the new council's first session, several streets were renamed after Paul von Hindenburg, Adolf Hitler and Wilhelm Murr. By May 1934, the NSDAP had successfully driven all remaining council members not with their party out of their offices.

While there is no record of Jews living in or around Lorch, a number of disabled people from the area are known to have fallen victim to the Nazis racial ideology at the Tötungsanstalt Grafeneck.

The 44th infantry division of the US-Army marched into Lorch from the north on 19 April 1945. Thanks to the mayor, in co-operation with the local NS elite, preventing the planned defense through the Volkssturm from occurring, the Americans were greeted with a white flag at the Lorch monastery. In total, Lorch and its surrounding area lost 256 people due to World War Two, with 64 more remaining missing.

=== Post-War Times ===
On 17 December 1945, the former mayor Wilhelm Scheufele, who had held the office since 1910, was dismissed by the occupying forces and replaced with Theo Lauder until Otto Bareiß took over the position in April 1946, having been elected by the new community council.

1945 and 1946 also saw a large number of refugees being relocated to Lorch, with a total of 650 people being counted in spring 1946.

On 1 January 1972, Lorch received its current borders after being merged with the municipality of Waldhausen.

== Religion ==
Since the Reformation, Lorch has been predominantly Protestant and there are currently three evangelical communities, those of Lorch, Waldhausen and Weitmars. In addition to these, there are two Roman Catholic communities, those of Lorch and Waldhausen, as well as a new apostolic community, which was formed after the new apostolic communities of Lorch and Waldhausen were merged in 2008.

== Politics ==
The Arbeitskreis Ökologie und Umwelt (AKÖ) is a body set up by the local council and consisting of citizens, which advises the local council on ecological issues and is intended to promote public environmental awareness. It met for the first time on 22 June 1990 and has held 81 meetings since then until June 2010.

=== Mayor ===
- 1910-1945: Wilhelm Scheufele
- 1945-1946: Theo Lauber
- 1946-1954: Otto Bareiß
- 1954-1972: Walter Frank
- 1972-1980: Walter Kübler
- 1980-1996: Werner Steinacker
- 1996-2020: Karl Bühler
- Since 2020: Marita Funk

=== Crest ===
The blazoning of the coat of arms reads: "In split shield in front in gold the black capital letter L, behind in black a golden lion. The letter L has been in the seal of the Blur since the 15th century. The Staufer lion in confused colors is intended to remind the town of its affiliation to the Staufer heartland. The coat of arms was introduced in 1934 [24].

=== Town twinning ===
Due to the common Staufer past, the town of Oria (Apulia) has been a twin town of Lorch since 1972. The flag-wavers of Oria became famous, which also occasionally appear at larger events in Lorch. There are friendly relations with Aflenz in Austrian Styria.

== Culture and sights ==
=== Buildings ===
- The main attraction is the Lorch Monastery on the Klosterberg. In the chapter house of the monastery a 100 m^{2} large round picture shows the history of the Staufer dynasty. It is a work of the Lorch artist Hans Kloss, completed in 2002.
- Next to the monastery buildings, a replica of a Roman wooden watchtower reminds us of the course of the Upper German-Raetian Limes. Very close by was the border between the Roman provinces of Upper Germania and Rhaetia. The replica of the watchtower is not true to the original, so only stone watchtowers are vouched for at all Limes sections south of the Main. Usually the entrance was on the first floor and could be reached by a ladder. The block construction method shown here was untypical for Roman wooden buildings.
- At today's Elisabethenberg above the Waldhausen district there was a castle of Staufer servants.
- The Catholic Church St. Konrad, built in modern architecture, was consecrated in November 1961. A predecessor church had existed since 1910, but it had become too small due to the influx of Catholics after the Second World War [25].
- The school building at Schillerplatz, inaugurated on 18 July 1892, had separate halves of the building for girls and boys. Today, one part serves as a community centre and one part as a public library.
- The Schillerhaus is erroneously considered to be the house where the poet Friedrich Schiller lived as a child in Lorch from 1764 to 1766.

=== World Cultural Heritage ===
- Since 15 July 2005, the Upper Germanic-Rhaetian Limes with the Limes Knee in Lorch has been a UNESCO World Heritage Site.

=== Remstal Garden Show 2019 ===
- White veiled "Luginsland" during the Remstal Garden Show 2019 From 10 May to 20 October 2019, a green project of the state of Baden-Württemberg took place in the Rems valley, in which Lorch also took part. This Remstal Garden Show 2019 is one of the "small" garden shows, which alternate annually with the state garden shows. In this context, the bank of the Rems at the inlet of the Götzenbach was designed as the "Rems Garden". Downstream, near Waldhausen, the place where the Rems has covered half of its journey between its source and mouth is marked with a stone monolith and a stone circle as the "Rems Centre" since 2018. Lorch participated in the "16 Stations", the architectural project of the garden show, with the "Crocheted House". For this purpose, the "Luginsland" in Lorch Monastery was covered with a 130 square metre crocheted white drape made of weatherproof nylon. In addition, Schillerplatz and the churchyard of the Evangelische Stadtkirche were redesigned.

=== Monuments of nature ===
The Lorcher Baggerseen is an 18.5-hectare (46-acre) nature reserve designated on 5 November 1981. It lies between Lorch and Waldhausen and is surrounded by the B 29 federal road, the Rems and the flowing Walkersbach. It includes softwood floodplains and areas that develop into hardwood floodplains and is the habitat of highly endangered plants and animals, especially birds.

In addition, there are four protected landscape areas in Lorch - the Aimersbach Valley, the areas around Welzheim and Walkersbach Valley, the Götzenbach Valley and the Haselbach Valley, three Schonwald forests - Klosterwäldle, Schillergrotte and Steindobel - as well as 19 extensive and 11 individual natural monuments.

Eight Wellingtonias (official name: 9 Wellingtonias) standing in the woods northwest of the monastery at 48° 48′ 31,3″ N, 9° 42′ 32,5″ O can be counted amongst the natural monuments, which can be traced back to a consignment of 50 annual plants from Wilhelma-Saat in 1866 to the former Welzheim forestry office in Lorch.

Until 1955 the approximately 1000 year old Barbarossa lime tree or Hohenstaufen lime tree stood in front of the monastery.

The Schelmenklinge, situated in the forest between Lorch and Alfdorf, is considered Lorch's oldest tourist attraction. In 1885, the local beautification association laid out a footpath through this valley surrounded by sandstone rocks; since probably before 1932, water games have been set up there on a length of 500 metres during the summer months, driven by the flowing stream. Since 1996, the Schwäbischer Albverein has been in charge of the path and water features.

== Notable people ==
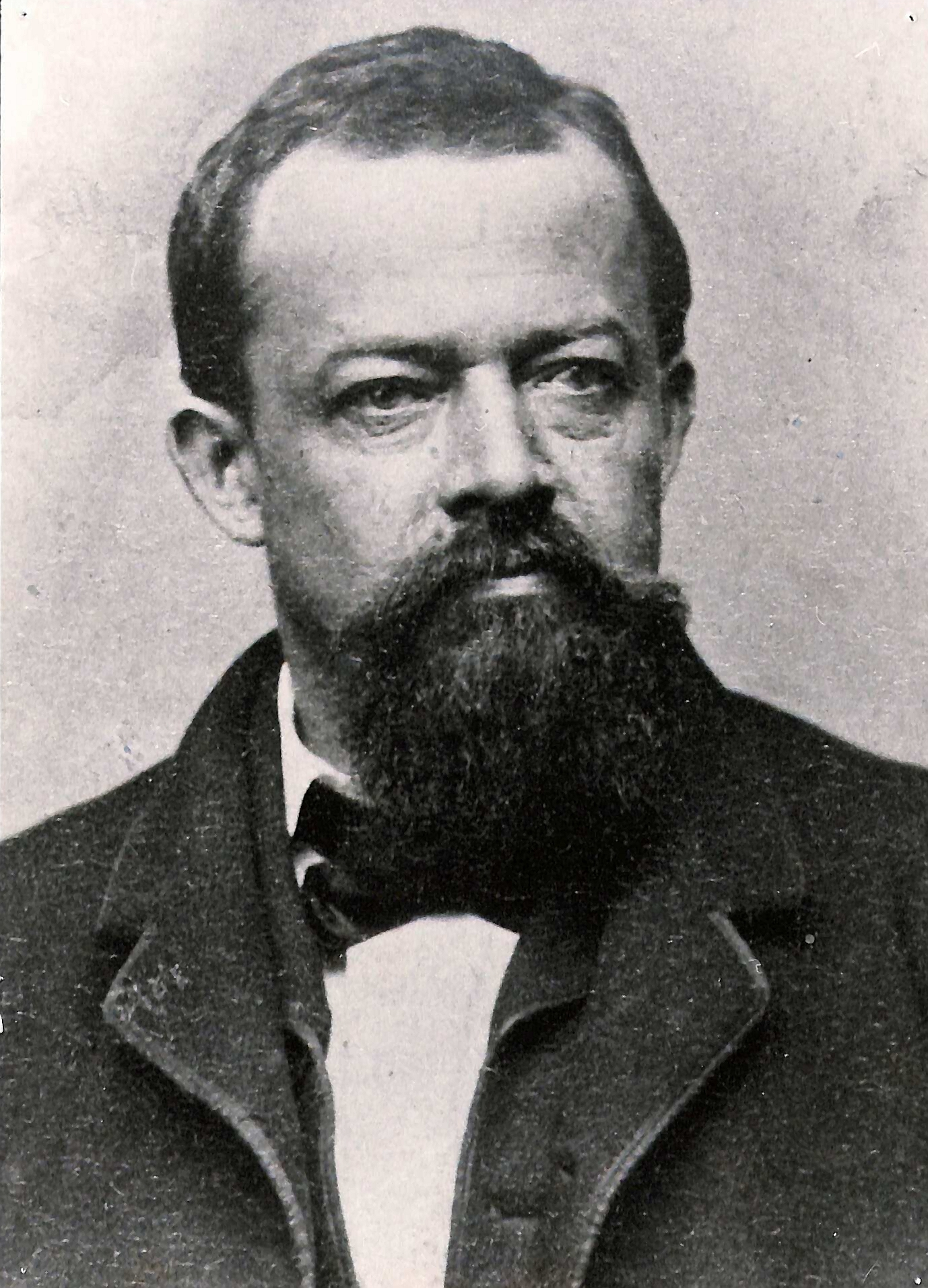
Oscar Fraas

- Matthias Hafenreffer (1561-1619), Lutheran theologian, born locally
- Friedrich Schiller (1759-1805), German poet and writer lived in Lorch from 1764 to 1766.
- Karl Philipp Conz (1762-1827), poet and writer, born locally
- Oscar Fraas (1824-1897), priest, naturalist and geologist, born locally
- Hermann E. Sieger (1902–1954), philatelist and Nazi Party official
- Lise Gast (1908–1988), author of children's and young adult literature, died locally
- Hans Kloss (1938–2018), artist and graphic designer; lived locally from 1969.
- Jello Krahmer (born 1995). a heavy weight German Greco-Roman wrestler, raised locally
