= Alexander Maier (politician) =

German politician (born 1991)

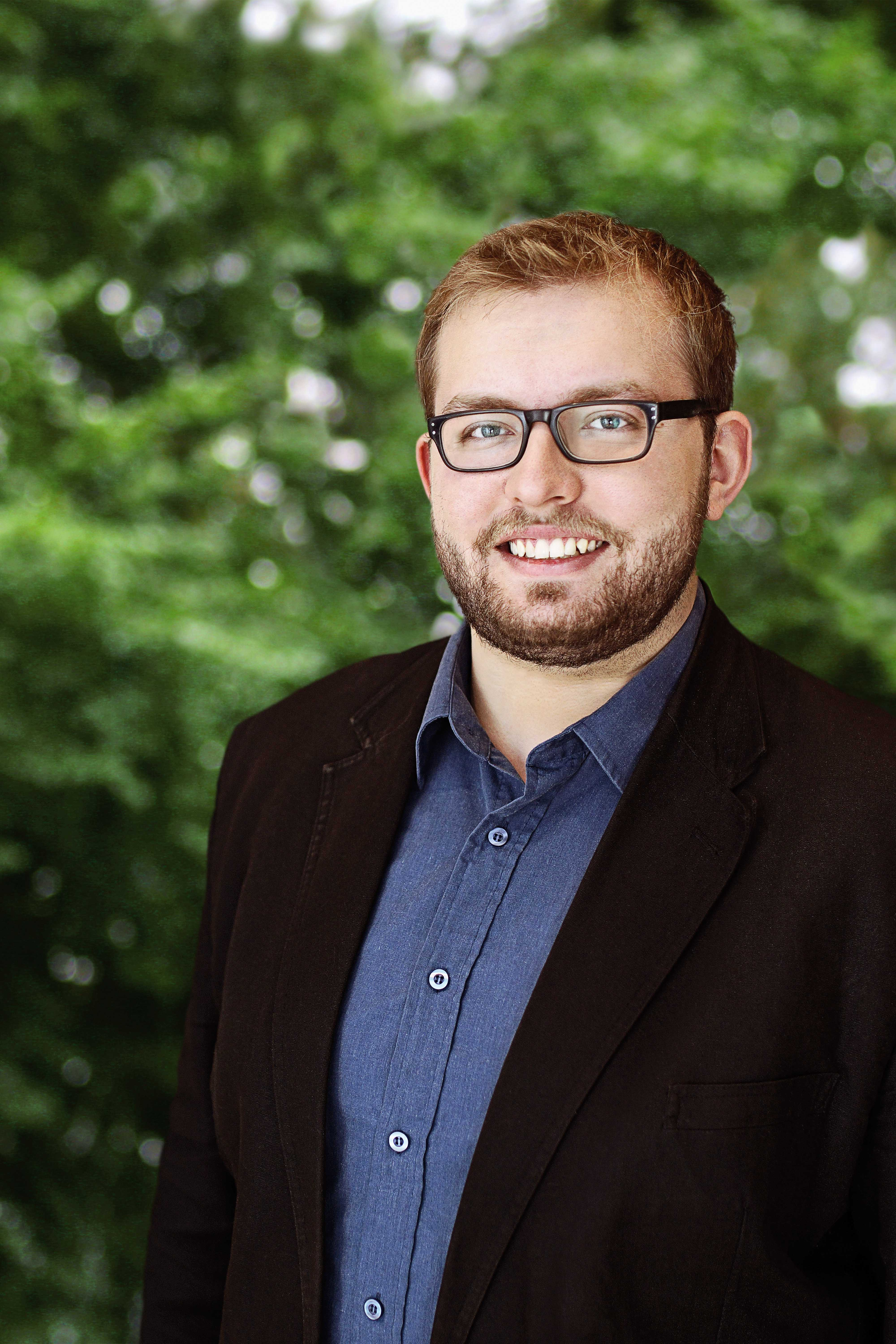
- Maier in 2015

Member of the Landtag of Baden-Württemberg
- In office 11 May 2016 – 31 December 2020
- Succeeded by: Christine Lipp-Wahl
- Constituency: Göppingen

Personal details
- Born: 27 March 1991 (age 35)
- Party: Alliance 90/The Greens (since 2009)

Alexander Maier (born 27 March 1991) is a German politician serving as lord mayor of Göppingen since 2021. From 2016 to 2020, he was a member of the Landtag of Baden-Württemberg.
