= Karl Aberle =

German publisher and politician (1901–1963)

Karl Aberle (17 September 1901 in Göppingen – 8 October 1963) was a German publisher and politician of the Social Democratic Party of Germany. He was associate editor of the Neuen Württembergischen Zeitung.

Aberle began initially working as an industrial worker, but later changed the job and worked until 1933 as an editor, but resumed as an industrial worker until 1945.

After the Second World War, he got together with Fritz Harz to publish a newspaper. The first edition of Neuen Württembergischen Zeitung was published on 2 August 1946.

Aberle was a member of the municipal council of Göppingen and the County Council of the district. From 1950 to 1952 he was a member of the Landtag of Württemberg-Baden.
