= Bezgenriet =

- Stadtteil of Göppingen
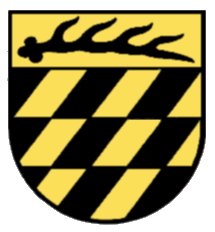
- Coat of arms

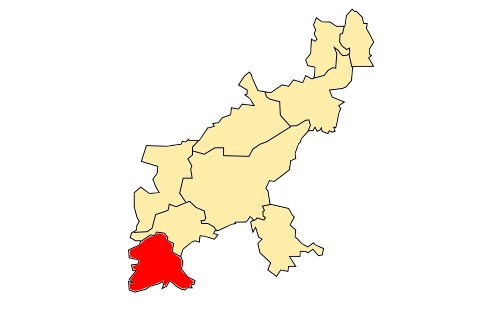
- Location of Bezgenriet in the town of Göppingen
- Interactive map of Bezgenriet
- Location within Germany Location within Baden-Württemberg
- Coordinates: 48°40′5″N 9°36′55″E
- Country: Germany
- State: Baden-Württemberg
- Admin. region: Stuttgart
- District: Göppingen
- Town: Göppingen

Area
  - Total: 5.46 km^{2} (2.11 sq mi)
- Elevation: 361 m (1,184 ft)

Population (2011)
  - Total: 1,580
  - Density: 289/km^{2} (749/sq mi)
- Time zone: UTC+01:00 (CET)
  - Summer (DST): UTC+02:00 (CEST)
- Postal codes: 73035
- Dialling codes: 07161

Bezgenriet (361 m above sea level) is the most southern district of Göppingen in Germany. Schopflenberg, which was created after Second World War by increased influx of refugees and displaced persons, belongs to the Stadtteil Bezgenriet .

== History ==
In 1110, Konrad II, Count of Württemberg gave parts of Pathicenriedt to the Blaubeuren Abbey, and this marks the first mention of the later name Bezgenriet. The place came in 1477 to the Office Göppingen. On 1 October 1957 Bezgenriet was incorporated as a district to Göppingen.

== Transportation ==
Bezgenriet is connected by the country road 1419 to the west with Hattenhofen and Schopflenberg, and to the east with Heiningen. The Staufer Street (Straße der Staufer) leads as country road 1214 through Bezgenriet, in one direction to Jebenhausen and in the other direction to Boll. The connection point Aichelberg of the Bundesautobahn 8 is in a distance of about 8 kilometers.

The nearest train stations are Göppingen and Faurndau.

== Attractions ==
The Laurentius Church was built in 1405 and is known for its frescoes of the Last Judgement. The frescoes were discovered after World War II during renovation work.

The Catholic Herz-Jesu-Kirche is in Schopflenberg.

== Literature ==
- Der Kreis Göppingen. Konrad Theiss Verlag, Stuttgart 1978, ISBN 3-8062-0374-1.
