= Birenbach =

German municipality

- Municipality
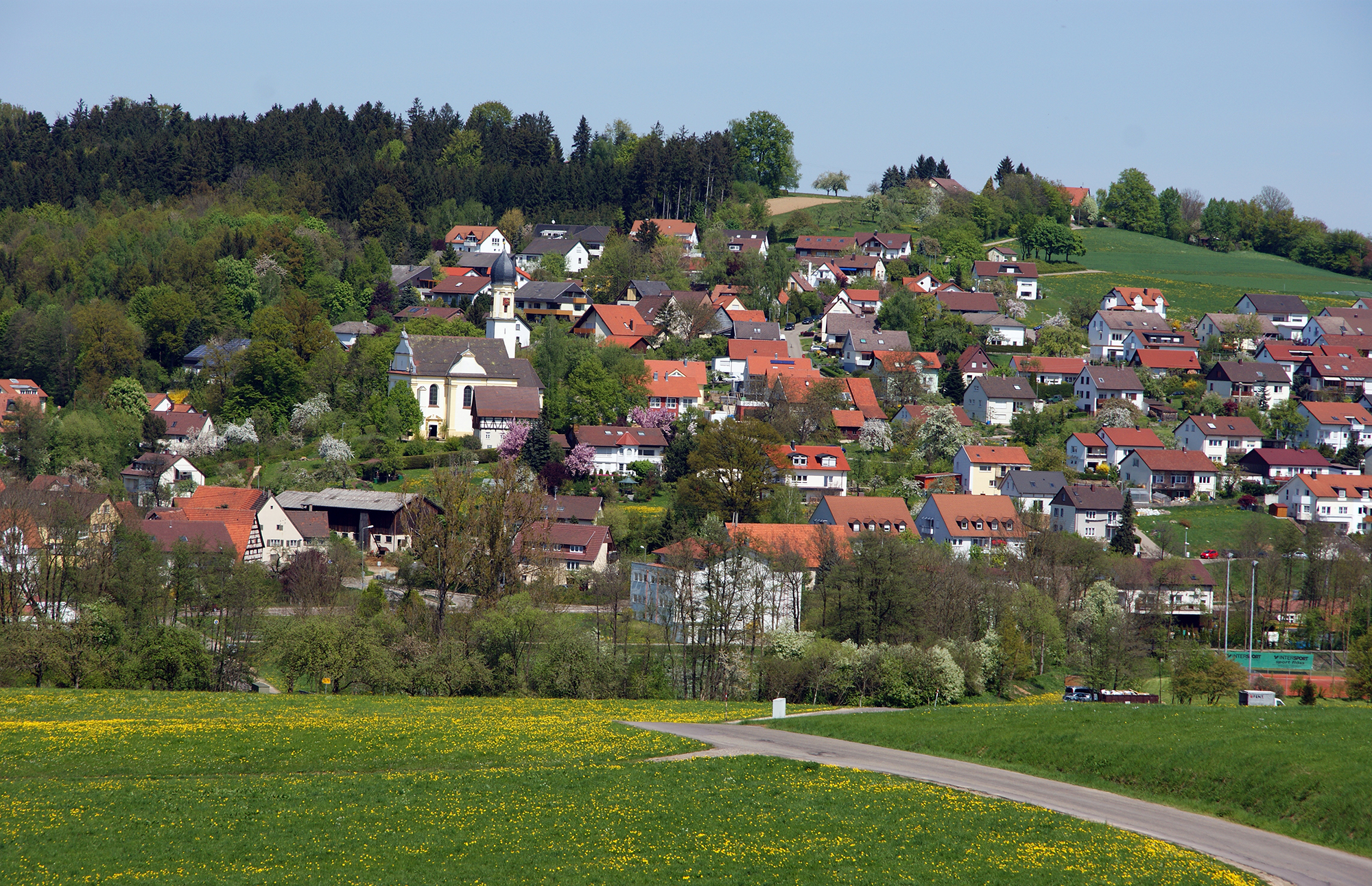
- View of Birenbach

- Coat of arms

- Location of Birenbach within Göppingen district
- Interactive map of Birenbach
- Location within Germany Location within Baden-Württemberg
- Coordinates: 48°44′51″N 9°39′48″E
- Country: Germany
- State: Baden-Württemberg
- Admin. region: Stuttgart
- District: Göppingen

Government
  - Mayor (2022–30): Michael Matzak

Area
  - Total: 2.50 km^{2} (0.97 sq mi)
- Elevation: 375 m (1,230 ft)

Population (2025-12-31)
  - Total: 1,931
  - Density: 772/km^{2} (2,000/sq mi)
- Time zone: UTC+01:00 (CET)
  - Summer (DST): UTC+02:00 (CEST)
- Postal codes: 73102
- Dialling codes: 07161
- Vehicle registration: GP
- Website: www.birenbach.de

Birenbach is a municipality in the district of Göppingen in Baden-Württemberg, Germany.

== History ==
As a result of the Protestant Reformation in Germany, the properties of the abbeys of Adelberg and Oberhof were seized by the Duchy of Württemberg. In 1806, all aristocratic properties in the area of Birenbach were mediatized to the now Kingdom of Württemberg. Birenbach was part of the municipality of Börtlingen until 1823, when it was made its own independent municipality and assigned to Oberamt Göppingen. This district was reorganized in 1938 as Landkreis Göppingen.

== Geography ==
The municipality (Gemeinde) of Birenbach is situated in the district of Göppingen, in Baden-Württemberg, one of the 16 States of the Federal Republic of Germany. Birenbach is located around the base of the Hohenstaufen, in the eastern foothills of the Swabian Jura, though a small portion of the municipal area lies in the Schurwald and Welzheim Forest to the west. Elevation above sea level in the municipal area ranges from a high of 521 meters (1,709 ft) Normalnull (NN) in the north to a low of 317 meters (1,040 ft) NN on the Krettenbach, in the south.

== Politics ==
Birenbach has one borough (Ortsteil), the town of Birenbach, and one village, Schützenhof. There is an abandoned village in the municipal area, Bremenhöfle. Birenbach is part of the Östlicher Schurwald municipal association, headquartered at Rechberghausen.

=== Coat of arms ===
Birenbach's coat of arms displays a lion, in black and facing to the left, above a blue, wavy fess upon a field of yellow. The lion is taken from the coat of arms of the Hohenstaufen. This coat of arms was created and adopted by the municipal council in 1958, and was approved for official use by the Federal Ministry of the Interior on 18 August 1959. A corresponding municipal flag was issued to the municipality on the same date by the same body.

== Transportation ==
Birenbach is connected to Germany's network of roadways by Bundesstraße 297. From 1907 to 1987, the municipality was also connected to Germany's system of railways by the Tälesbahn. Local public transportation is provided by the Filsland Mobilitätsverbundes.
