= Lise Gast =

German author and translator (1908–1988)

Lise Gast (legal name Elisabeth Richter, née Gast; 2 January 1908 – 26 September 1988) was a German author of children's and young adult literature and translator from Dutch and English.

== Life ==
Gast was born on 2 January 1908 in Leipzig. She trained as an agricultural teacher and married Georg Richter in 1933. The marriage produced eight children. Her first book Brave Young Susanne was published in 1936, followed in 1939 by Young Mother Randi, which was a success. She chose the pseudonym Lise Gast to match her birth name, under which she had previously published stories. On 12 February 1945, Lise Gast fled with her children from Silesia to Radebeul, a town bordering Dresden, where she arrived on the evening of the first bombing wave of Dresden, around 6 p.m. on 13 February. At the end of March, she fled to Wedderstedt near Quedlinburg, where she worked as a day laborer for three years. Her eighth child, Christoph, was born there. Two weeks later, she learned of her husband's death as a prisoner of war in Pacov in Czechoslovakia.

In November 1948, she fled across the zonal border to Hardehausen in Westphalia with the help of Hans Lißner. There she devoted herself entirely to writing. In order to live near her publishers based in Stuttgart, she bought a former Arbeitsdienstbarrack in Aimersbachtal near Lorch in 1955, where she founded a pony farm. She wrote about life on this farm, where Lise Gast bred Shetland ponies and Icelandic ponies, in other books. She was also active as a columnist.

In total, Lise Gast wrote around 120 books. Two weeks before her death, she read from her last book publication Nichts bleibt, mein Herz, und alles ist von Dauer in Schwäbisch Gmünd. Lise Gast was buried in Lorch. Her daughter Marianne Späh is also an author and published her mother's memoirs That's how it was. Good that it was like that! Lise Gast tells stories from her life.

She died on 26 September 1988 in Lorch (Württemberg).

Gast was a friend of the author and horse expert Ursula Bruns for many years.

== Works (selection) ==
- Tapfere junge Susanne. The story of a comradeship. With text drawings by Kurt Schöllkopf. Union Verlag, Stuttgart-Berlin-Leipzig 1936
- Kopf hoch, Barbara. A story about young people. Interior pictures by R. Pfennigwerth. H.-J. Fischer-Verlag, Berlin-Leipzig 1939
- Das zaudernde Herz. Novel. Peter J. Oestergaard, Berlin 1939
- Junge Mutter Randi. Novel. With drawings by Siegfried Kortemeier. Bertelsmann, Gütersloh 1939
- Die Kinder von Wienhagen. Funny story of six children on an estate. With cover picture and 25 pictures in the text by Rolf Winker. Herold-Verlag, Stuttgart 1940
- Die heimliche Last. Novel. Kaiser, Böhmisch-Leipa 1942
- Kamerad fürs Leben. A novel about young people. Kaiser, Böhmisch-Leipa 1942
- Die kleinen Brüder. With illustration. Kaiser, Böhmisch-Leipa 1943
- Eine Frau allein. A German fate from our days. Edition El Buen Libvro, Buenos Aires 1948
- Die Heimonskinder. Story. Thienemann, Stuttgart 1950
- Das Träumerlein. 1st-14th edition, Verlag Die Boje, Stuttgart 1952
- Ponyglück bei Lise Gast, Verlag E. Hoffmann, 1965

== Awards and honors ==
- 1983: Cross of Merit on Ribbon of the Federal Republic of Germany

== Literature ==
- Susanne Lange-Greve: Unsichtbare Fäden. Lise Gast 1908-1988. Einhorn-Verlag, Schwäbisch Gmünd 2008, ISBN 978-3-936373-00-4.
