= Uhingen =

Town in Baden-Württemberg, Germany

- Town
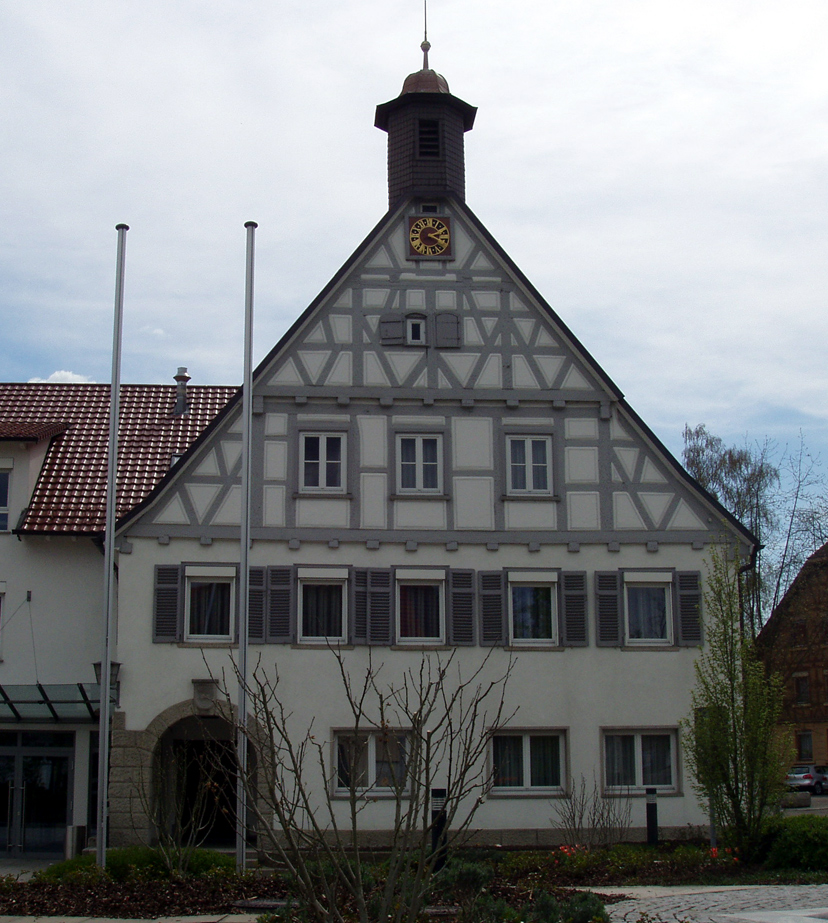
- Uhingen town hall

- Coat of arms

- Location of Uhingen within Göppingen district
- Interactive map of Uhingen
- Location within Germany Location within Baden-Württemberg
- Coordinates: 48°42′21″N 9°35′31″E
- Country: Germany
- State: Baden-Württemberg
- Admin. region: Stuttgart
- District: Göppingen

Area
  - Total: 24.79 km^{2} (9.57 sq mi)
- Elevation: 295 m (968 ft)

Population (2025-12-31)
  - Total: 14,203
  - Density: 572.9/km^{2} (1,484/sq mi)
- Time zone: UTC+01:00 (CET)
  - Summer (DST): UTC+02:00 (CEST)
- Postal codes: 73062–73066
- Dialling codes: 07161, 07163
- Vehicle registration: GP
- Website: www.uhingen.de

Uhingen (German pronunciation: [ˈuːɪŋən]) is a town in the district of Göppingen in Baden-Württemberg in southern Germany.

== History ==
Uhingen was a possession of the County of Aichelberg until 1332.

== Geography ==
The city (Stadt) of Uhingen is located on the north-west of the district of Göppingen, in the German state of Baden-Württemberg. The municipal area lies along the border with the Rems-Murr district to the north. Physically, Uhingen is situated in the lower Fils river valley, in the foothills of the Central Swabia Jura. A portion of the municipal area is in the Schurwald region, to the northwest. Elevation above sea level in the municipal area ranges from a low of 257 meters (843 ft) Normalnull (NN) to a high of 483 meters (1,585 ft) NN.

The Federally-protected Bärentobel nature reserve is located in Uhingen's municipal area.

== Politics ==
Uhingen has six more boroughs (Stadtteile): Baiereck, Holzhausen, Sparwiesen, Nassach, Diegelsberg and Nassachmühle.

=== Coat of arms ===
Uhingen's coat of arms displays a field of red crossed by a white, wavy fess complemented with a white canton in the upper left corner of the blazon. This pattern, devised by the Central State Archive Stuttgart in 1912, is the coat of arms of the House of Aichelberg, with the addition of the fess to represent the river Fils.

== Transportation ==
Uhingen is a center of local transportation and an infrastructure nexus. The city is connected to Germany's network of roadways by Bundesstraße 10 and Bundesstraße 297. It is also connected to Germany's railways by the Fils Valley Railway, which was run through the municipal area in 1847. Public transportation is provided by Deutsche Bahn, the VVS and the Uhingen Citizens' Bus Association.
