= Schurwald =

Mountain range in Germany

Coordinates: 48°46′N 9°30′E

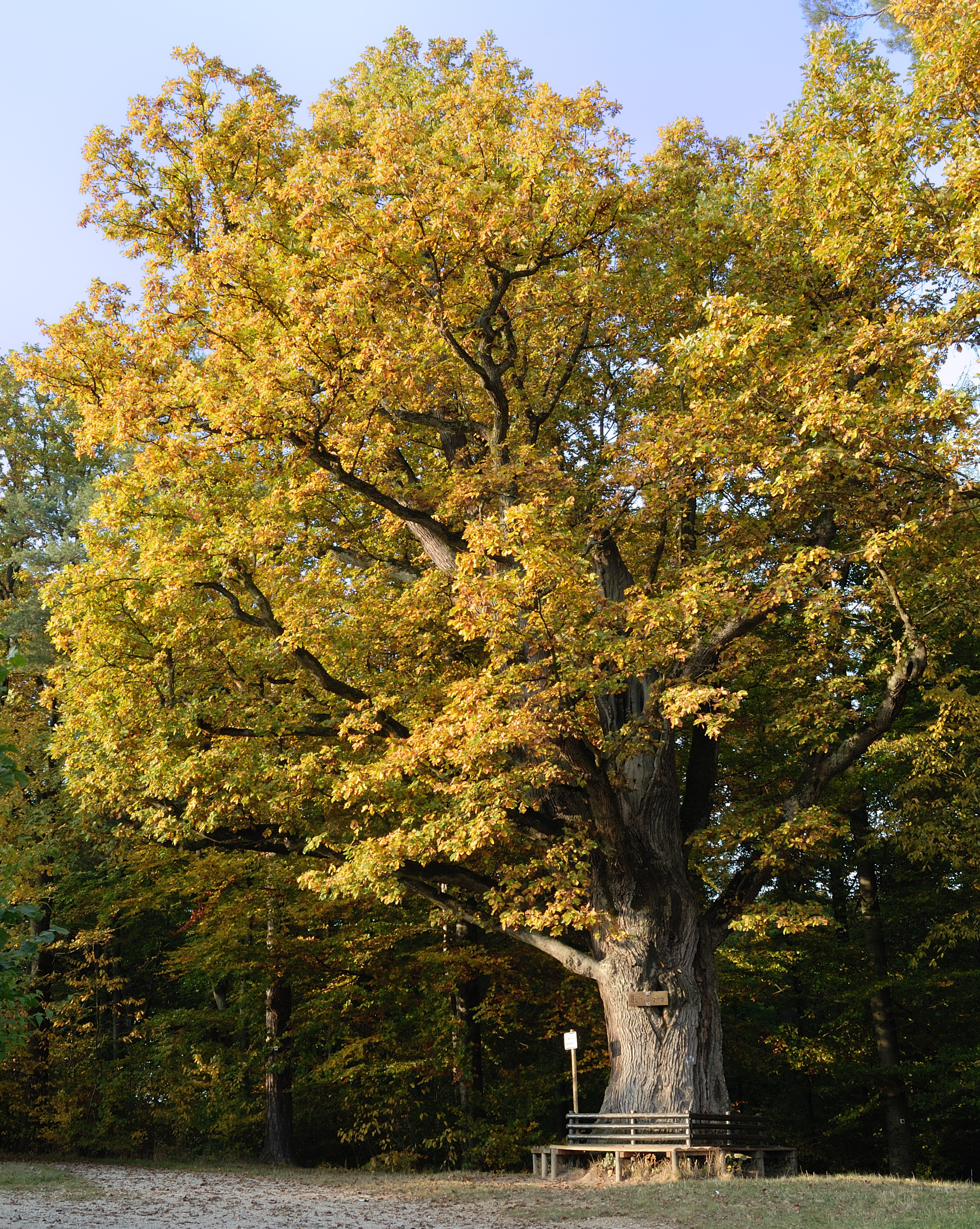
Tree on the southern edge of the forest in Plochingen

The Schurwald (German pronunciation: [ʃuːɐ̯ˌvalt]) is a wooded mountain range in Baden-Württemberg, southern Germany, which at its highest point is 513.2 m above sea level.

It is one of the most important Recreation areas for the Stuttgart area. Over the centuries, the vast forests of the mountain range supplied the surrounding towns and villages with wood for fuel and building material, and thus acquired the name "Schurwald", which comes from the German word, Schur, which can mean a shearing or clearcutting.

== Geography ==
The Schurwald begins to the east of Stuttgart and runs eastwards to the foothills of the Swabian Alb, passing through the districts of Esslingen, Göppingen and Rems-Murr-Kreis. It is bordered to the south by valleys of the Neckar and Fils rivers, and to the north by the valley of the Rems. At the eastern end of the Schurwald, which is crossed by numerous streams, is the Herrenbach Reservoir.

== Geology ==
Geologically, the Schurwald is a dissected cuesta, formed by headward erosion. It contains clay, marl and Late Triassic sandstone. Lias alpha from the early Jurassic can also be found, but only on the plateau.

== Economy ==
Agriculture no longer plays a major role in the economy of the Schurwald, and in the last few years a number of farms have been forced to close. Crops grown due to the elevation typically include various kinds of cereals, and root crops such as sugar beet and potatoes. Due to the cool climate, growth of fruit in orchards is limited, however on the slopes facing south vineyards grow grapes for red and white wine. Most residents commute between their homes and the towns of Esslingen, Göppingen and Stuttgart and the Rems Valley. Nassachtal, within the Schurwald, was once one of the poorest places in Württemberg. The forest was once used for the production of charcoal, and was an important source for late medieval glassmakers.

== Peaks ==
The highest peaks of the Schurwald are:

- Kernen (513.2 m)
- Kappelberg (469 m, containing the Kappelberg Tunnel)
- Weißer Stein (442 m; monument rather than a mountain)
- Württemberg (411 m), site of the Württemberg Mausoleum

== Settlements ==
The following settlements are found within the Schurwald:

- Adelberg
- Aichwald
- Baltmannsweiler
- Birenbach
- Börtlingen
- Lichtenwald
- Nassachtal
- Rechberghausen
- Wäschenbeuren
- Wangen

== Literature ==
- Schraitle, Egon, Bauer, Ernst Waldemar et al.: Schurwald – Esslingen – Filder. Natur – Heimat – Wandern. Schwäbischer Albverein e. V., Stuttgart. 2., neubearbeitete Auflage. Theiss, Stuttgart 1998, ISBN 3-8062-1344-5.
- Schmidt, Werner: Rundwanderungen Schwäbischer Wald und Schurwald. Berglen, Ellwanger Berge, Frickenhofer Höhe, Limpurger Berge, Löwensteiner Berge, Mainhardter Wald, Murrhardter Wald, Schurwald, Waldenburger Berge, Welzheimer Wald. 5., aktualisierte Auflage. Schneider-Verlag Hohengehren, Baltmannsweiler 2002, ISBN 3-89676-576-0.
