= Rechberghausen =

- Municipality
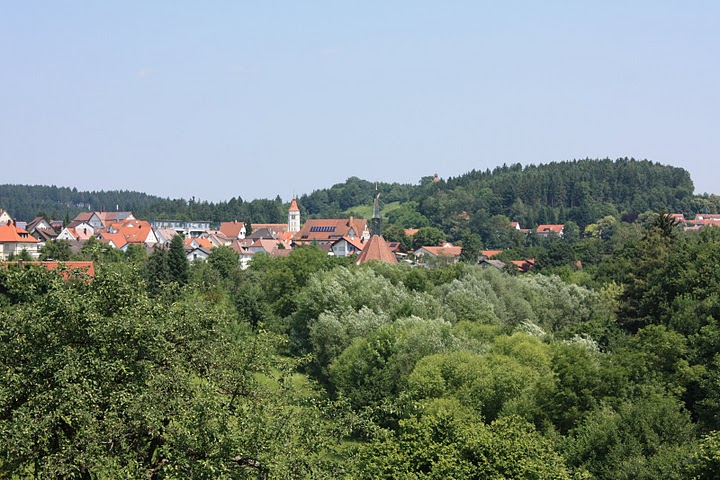
- Rechberghausen

- Coat of arms

- Location of Rechberghausen within Göppingen district
- Interactive map of Rechberghausen
- Location within Germany Location within Baden-Württemberg
- Coordinates: 48°43′50″N 9°38′23″E
- Country: Germany
- State: Baden-Württemberg
- Admin. region: Stuttgart
- District: Göppingen

Government
  - Mayor (2023–31): Claudia Dörner

Area
  - Total: 6.40 km^{2} (2.47 sq mi)
- Elevation: 339 m (1,112 ft)

Population (2025-12-31)
  - Total: 5,427
  - Density: 848/km^{2} (2,200/sq mi)
- Time zone: UTC+01:00 (CET)
  - Summer (DST): UTC+02:00 (CEST)
- Postal codes: 73098
- Dialling codes: 07161
- Vehicle registration: GP
- Website: www.rechberghausen.de

Rechberghausen is a municipality in the district of Göppingen in Baden-Württemberg in southern Germany.

== Geography ==
=== Geographical location ===
The community lies in on the foothills of the central Swabian Jura and on the edge of the eastern Schurwald. The elevation is 320 to 400 metres (1,000 to 1,300 ft) amsl.

== Neighbouring communities ==
In the northwest the municipality borders to Börtlingen, in the northeast to Birenbach. Eastern and south-eastern neighbour is the county seat Göppingen, with its Bartenbach district, the western neighbour is the community Wangen (Göppingen). All are located in the district of Göppingen.

== History ==
The place was first mentioned in 1245. He was then the Dukes of Teck after the local castle had previously probably heard the Lords of Rechberghausen.

== Religions ==
Till the 1970s, the Catholics had a great majority. Today there is a very active evangelical community. The Catholic Church Mariä Himmelfahrt was consecrated in 1912, the evangelic Jesus Christus Kirche in 1961.

=== Inhabitants ===
The development between 1837 and 2010.

Date	Inhabitants
1837	737
1907	1.335
17. May 1939	1.726
13. September 1950	2.514
27. May 1970	4.629
31. December 1983	4.916
31. December 2000	5.490
31. December 2005	5.532
31. December 2010	5.366

Source: Statistical Office Stuttgart

== Mayor ==
Mayor was from December 1, 1977, to June 30, 2015, Reiner Johannes Ruf. Since July 1, 2015 Claudia Dörner is the new mayor in Rechberghausen.
