= Börtlingen =

- Municipality
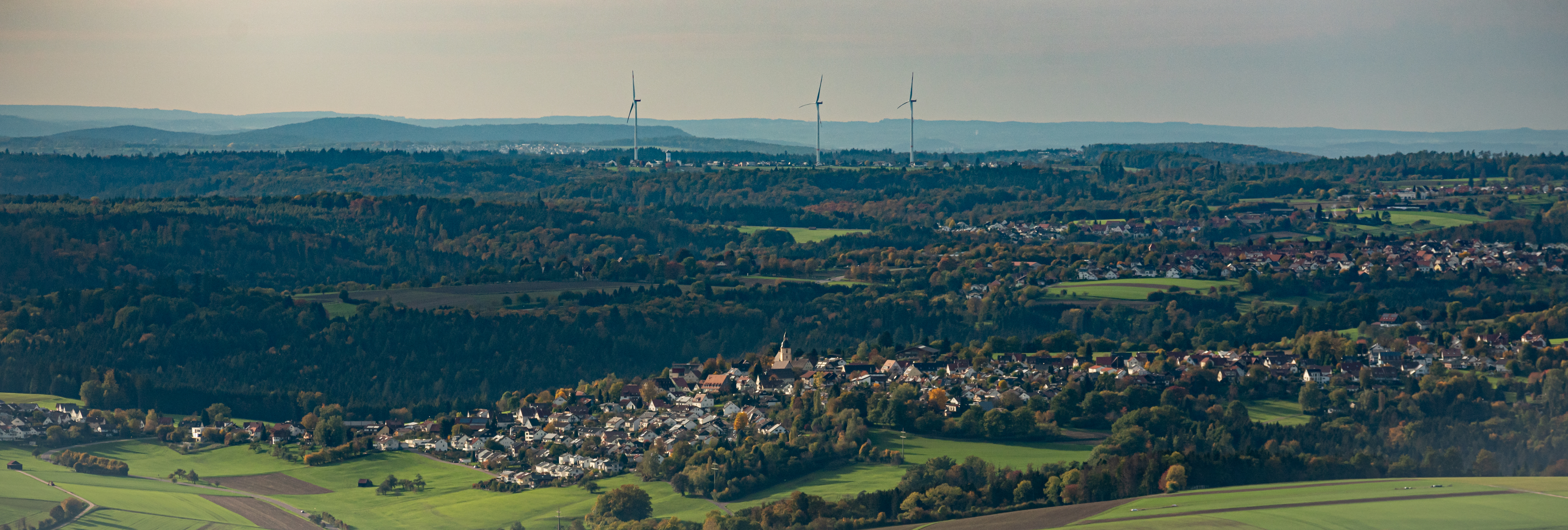
- Börtlingen as seen from Hohenstaufen

- Coat of arms

- Location of Börtlingen within Göppingen district
- Interactive map of Börtlingen
- Location within Germany Location within Baden-Württemberg
- Coordinates: 48°45′13″N 9°37′55″E
- Country: Germany
- State: Baden-Württemberg
- Admin. region: Stuttgart
- District: Göppingen

Government
  - Mayor (2020–28): Sabine Catenazzo (Greens)

Area
  - Total: 8.26 km^{2} (3.19 sq mi)
- Elevation: 450 m (1,480 ft)

Population (2025-12-31)
  - Total: 1,718
  - Density: 208/km^{2} (539/sq mi)
- Time zone: UTC+01:00 (CET)
  - Summer (DST): UTC+02:00 (CEST)
- Postal codes: 73104
- Dialling codes: 07161
- Vehicle registration: GP
- Website: www.boertlingen.de

Börtlingen is a municipality in the district of Göppingen in Baden-Württemberg in southern Germany.

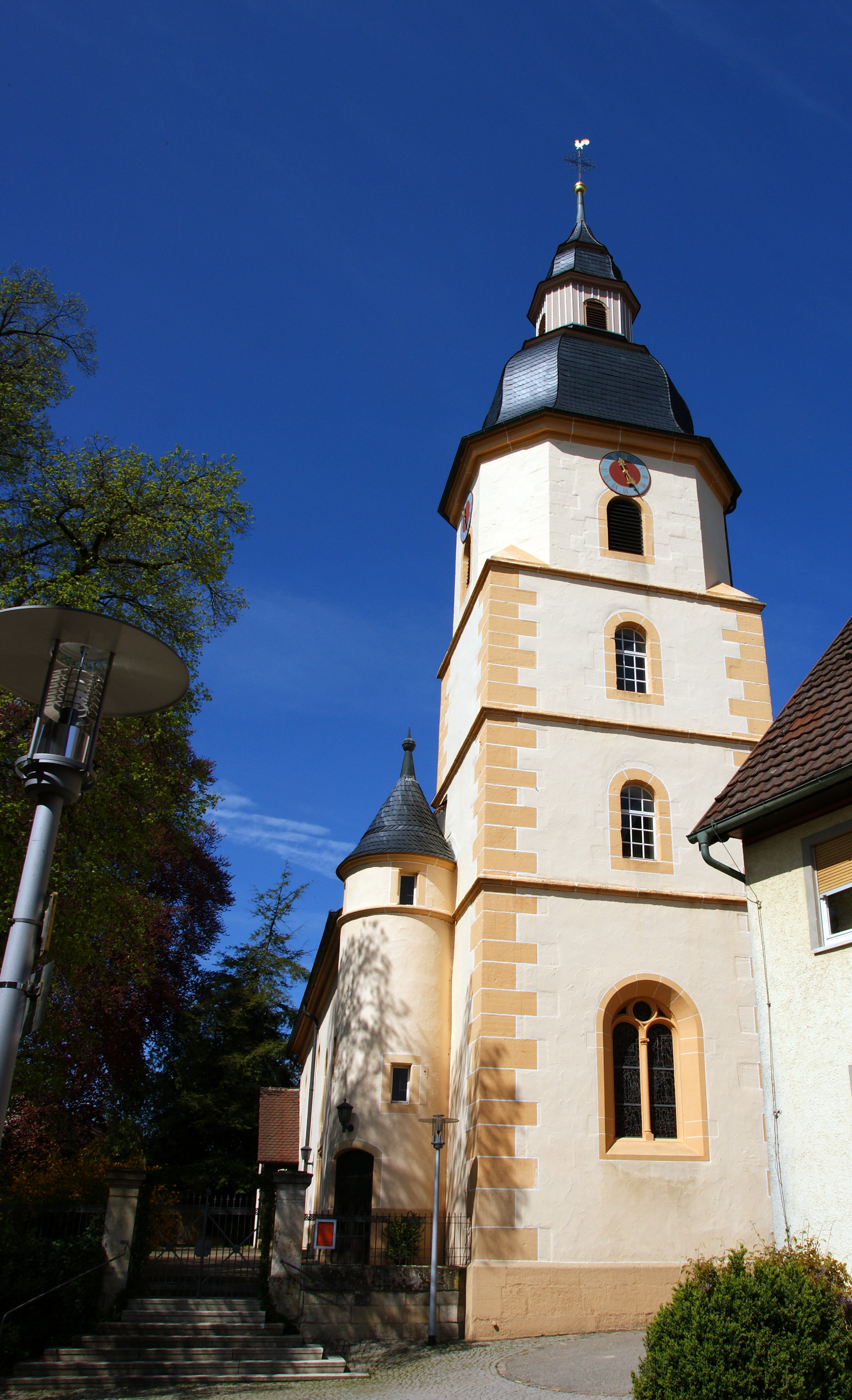
Johanneskirche, Börtlingen, Württemberg. A very old church originating from 1202, and renovated between 1991 and 2000.

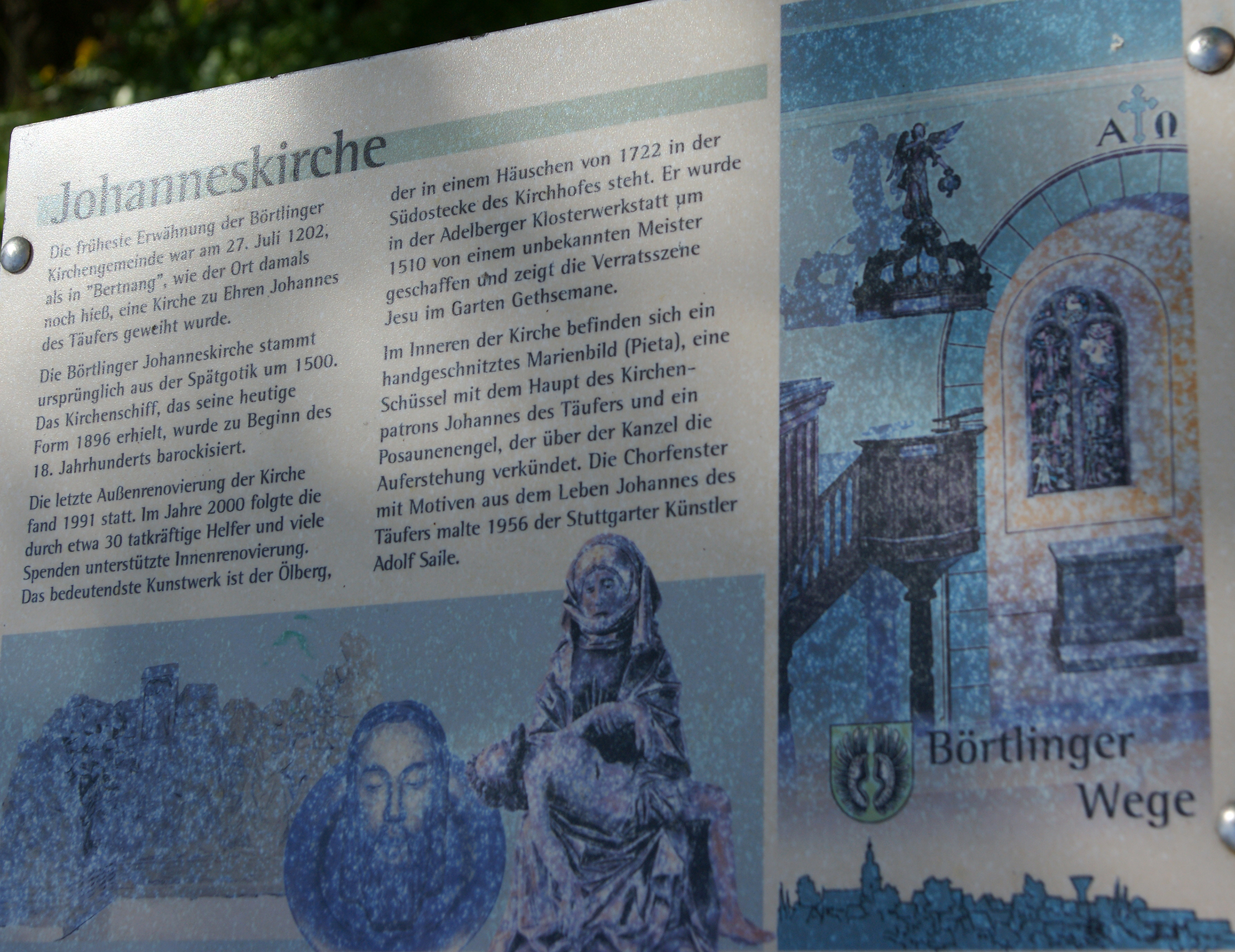
History of the very old Johanneskirche in Börtlingen, Württemberg.

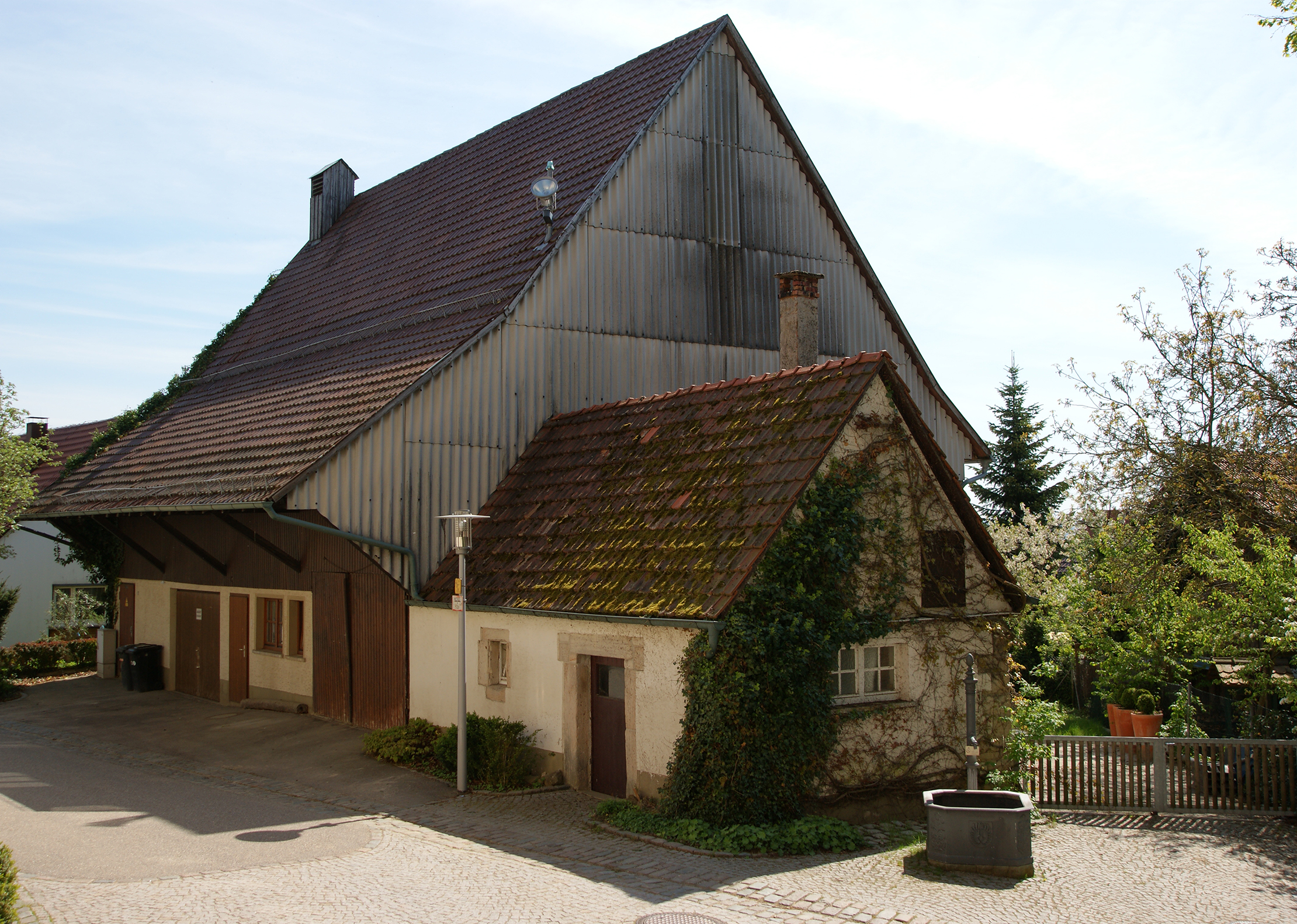
A barn and well in Börtlingen

== Geography ==
Börtlingen is on the periphery of the metropolitan region of Stuttgart. It is in the Schurwald, 334–498 m above sea level, about 6 km north of the town of Göppingen.

The municipality of Börtlingen includes the village of Börtlingen, the two hamlets of Breech and Zell, the estates of Ödweiler, Schweizerhof and Schneiderhof, and the remains of the village of Oedweiler.

=== Population development ===
Date	Residents
1837	669
1907	660
17. May 1939	651
13. September 1950	935
27. May 1970	1.311
31. December 1983	1.571
31. December 2000	1.767
31. December 2005	1.798
31. December 2010	1.754

Source: Statistical Office Baden-Württemberg Stuttgart

== Transportation ==
Börtlingen is accessible via the B 297 and the county road K 1408 from Lorch and Göppingen. Local roads lead to Zachersmühle and Oberwälden and about the Kaisersträßle to Adelberg and Oberberken.

There is a bus service to and from Göppingen. Börtlingen was formerly connected to the rail network by the Hohenstaufenbahn (Schwäbisch Gmünd – Göppingen) at the Adelberg-Börtlingen station.

== Education ==
With Paul Roth-school Börtlingen has its own primary school, there is also a Protestant kindergarten. Schools can be reached in Rechberghausen and Göppingen.

== Buildings ==
Located in the upper part of Börtlingen is the St. John's Church, which was inaugurated in 1202. The original late Gothic building of the present church was built in 1500 and was later in the 18th century probably modeled in Baroque style .

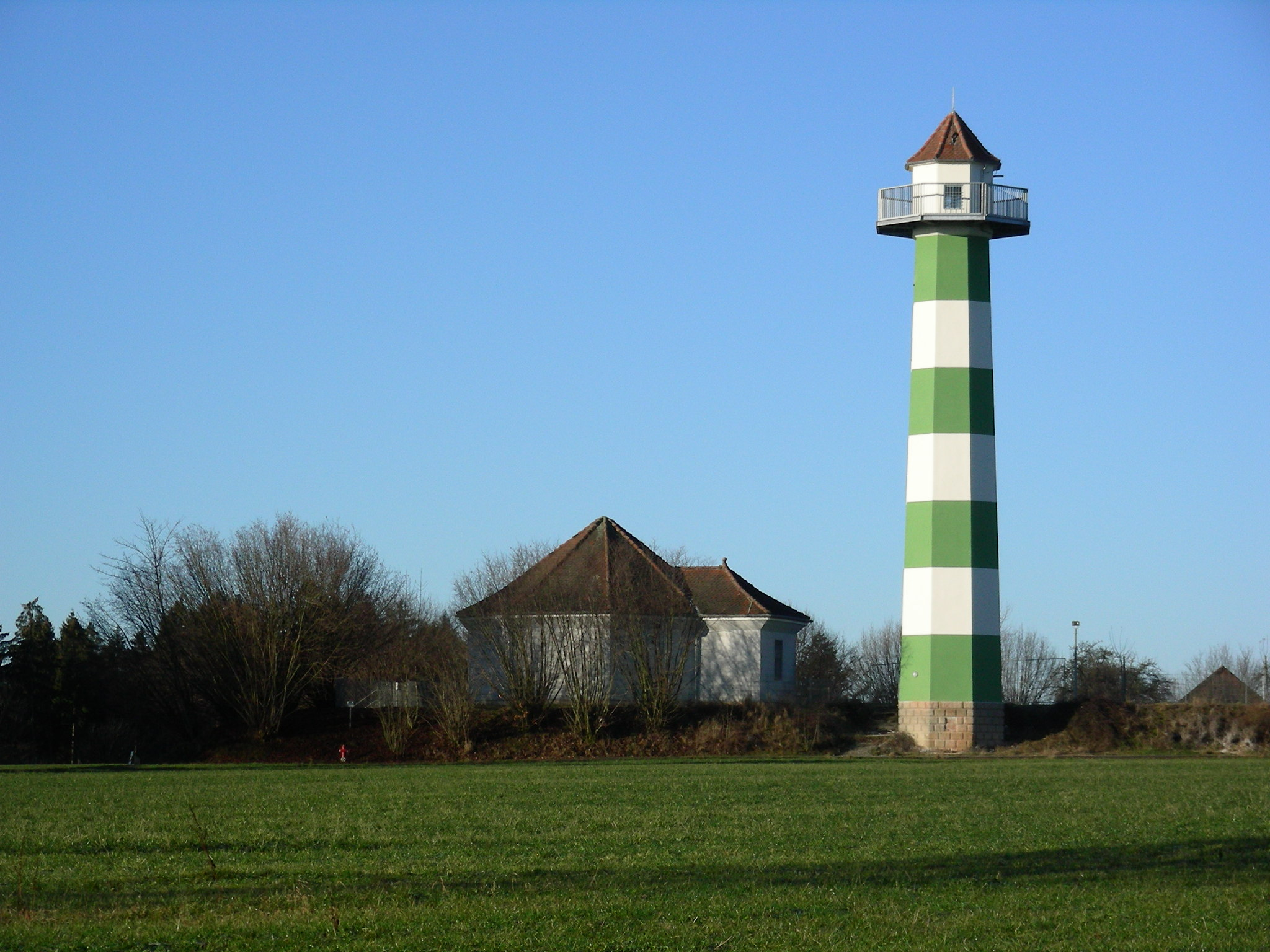
Reinhold Maier Turm Börtlingen District of Göppingen

Between Breech and Rattenharz, at the county road K 1408 is the Reinhold Maier-tower. The observation tower, a former water tower, has a height of about 25 m and can be seen from Börtlingen. It was built in 1914 and was until 2008 in use as a water tower. It was subsequently preserved on the initiative of the mayor and some citizens.
