= Göppingen =

- Town
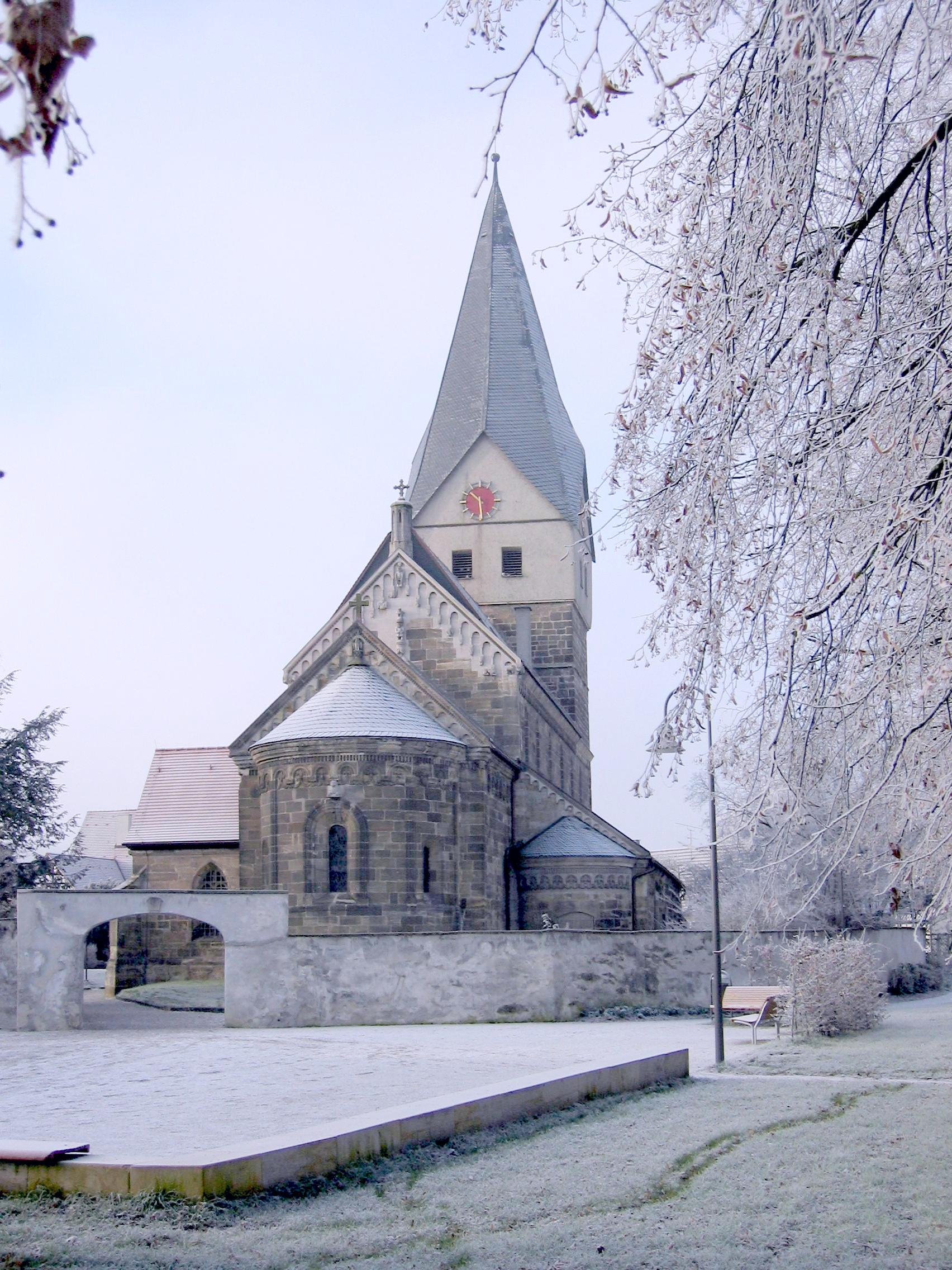
- Stiftskirche

- Coat of arms

- Location of Göppingen within Göppingen district
- Interactive map of Göppingen
- Location within Germany Location within Baden-Württemberg
- Coordinates: 48°42′9″N 9°39′10″E
- Country: Germany
- State: Baden-Württemberg
- Admin. region: Stuttgart
- District: Göppingen

Government
  - Mayor (2020–28): Alexander Maier (Greens)

Area
  - Total: 59.21 km^{2} (22.86 sq mi)
- Elevation: 323 m (1,060 ft)

Population (2025-12-31)
  - Total: 58,678
  - Density: 991.0/km^{2} (2,567/sq mi)
- Time zone: UTC+01:00 (CET)
  - Summer (DST): UTC+02:00 (CEST)
- Postal codes: 73033–73037, 73116 (Krettenhof)
- Dialling codes: 07161, 07165, 07163
- Vehicle registration: GP
- Website: www.Goeppingen.de

Göppingen (German pronunciation: [ˈɡœpɪŋən]; Swabian: Geppenge or Swabian: Gebbenga) is a town in southern Germany, part of the Stuttgart Region of Baden-Württemberg. It is the capital of the district Göppingen. Göppingen is home to the toy company Märklin and hosts the headquarters of TeamViewer AG.

== Geography ==
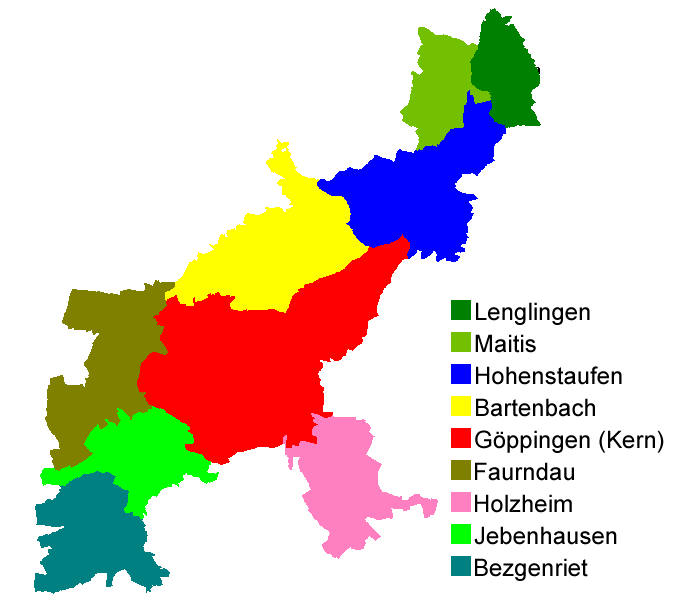
Districts of Göppingen

Göppingen is situated at the bottom of the Hohenstaufen mountain, in the valley of the river Fils. The districts of Göppingen are Bartenbach, Bezgenriet, Faurndau, Göppingen, Hohenstaufen, Holzheim, Jebenhausen and Maitis.

== History ==
Tradition holds that the city was founded by an Alemannic leader called Geppo sometime in the 3rd or 4th century. A disastrous fire on August 25, 1782 destroyed most of the town, but it was immediately rebuilt. Industrialisation during the 19th century made the area into a centre of industry. The importance of such industry is still seen in the town in the present day in companies such as Märklin and Schuler.

=== Jewish community ===
Göppingen and the nearby village of Jebenhausen were home to a thriving Jewish community from 1777 until the Holocaust. In 1777, the Baron von Liebenstein issued a "Letter of Protection" granting Elias Gutmann and other Jews permission to settle in Jebenhausen. The community grew and peaked in the mid-1800s, with the population center shifting from Jebenhausen to Göppingen and a substantial emigration of Jewish families to America by the late 19th Century. The Göppingen synagogue, constructed in 1881, was destroyed during the Kristallnacht from 9–10 November 1938. Detailed records of the communities were collected by Rabbi Dr. Aron Tänzer, who served the community from 1907-1937, and who was also a driving force behind the establishment of the secular city library in Göppingen. A comprehensive Jewish community history, Die Geschichte der Juden in Jebenhausen und Göppingen, was first produced by Tänzer in 1927, on the 150th anniversary of the settlement of Jebenhausen, and re-released in 1988 by the city of Göppingen with updated material added by Karl-Heinz Ruess. The Jewish Museum in Jebenhausen, opened in 1992, documents and preserves the history of the Jewish community of Jebenhausen and Göppingen.

=== Cooke Barracks ===
In 1930, a civilian air field was built north of Göppingen. This was acquired by the Luftwaffe (German Air Force) in 1935 and expanded into Fliegerhorst Kaserne. From 1945 through 1949, displaced persons and refugees were housed in the kaserne. In 1949, it was renamed Cooke Barracks in honor of Charles H. Cooke, Jr. who had been posthumously awarded the Silver Star and Soldier's Medal for gallantry in action. In late 1950, the VII Corps (US) had been reactivated in Stuttgart and U.S. Army units began to be stationed at Cooke Barracks. The barracks began to be expanded and was used as the 28th Infantry Division headquarters. The 28th Infantry was redesignated as the 9th Infantry Division (United States) in 1954 and was replaced by the 8th Infantry Division in 1956. They were then replaced by the 4th Armored Division in 1957, which was redesignated as the 1st Armored Division in 1971 and moved to Hindenburg Kaserne in Ansbach in 1972. The 1st Infantry Division (Forward) moved from Augsburg in 1972 until they were deactivated in 1991. There was a school for military dependents (Kindergarten through eighth grade) within walking distance of the family housing. Teachers at this school were credentialed U.S. educators employed by DoDDs (Department of Defense Dependents Schools). There was also a local civilian employed to teach the German language, songs, and customs. (Frau Lore Bader) Cooke Barracks was returned to the German government in 1992. The barracks were again used to house refugees for some time, then returned to civilian use.

== Mayors ==
- 1819–1824: Viktor David Keller
- 1824–1858: Ludwig Heinrich Widmann
- 1858–1881: Georg Christian Philipp Friedrich Seefried (1814-1881)
- 1881–1908: Gottlob Friedrich Allinger
- 1908–1919: Julius Keck (1869-1924)
- 1919–1933: Otto Hartmann
- 1933–1945: Erich Pack
- 1945–1954: Christian Eberhard (1886–1973)
- 1954–1980: Herbert König
- 1981–1996: Hans Haller
- 1997–2004: Reinhard Frank (born 1955), (CDU)
- 2005–2021: Guido Till (born 1955), (SPD/independent/CDU)
- since 2021: Alexander Maier (born 1991), (Greens)

== Sports ==
Local sports club Frisch Auf Göppingen currently play in the German first team handball men's top division Handball-Bundesliga.

== Media ==
Göppingen has its own daily newspaper called "Neue Württembergische Zeitung". The "Stuttgarter Zeitung" also has a local editorial office in Göppingen. In addition, Göppingen has its own local TV station, the "Filstalwelle". It can be received in the local cable network and via the web. Göppingen also has "Radio Fips" which is a radio station operated by a non-profit association.

== Twin towns – sister cities ==
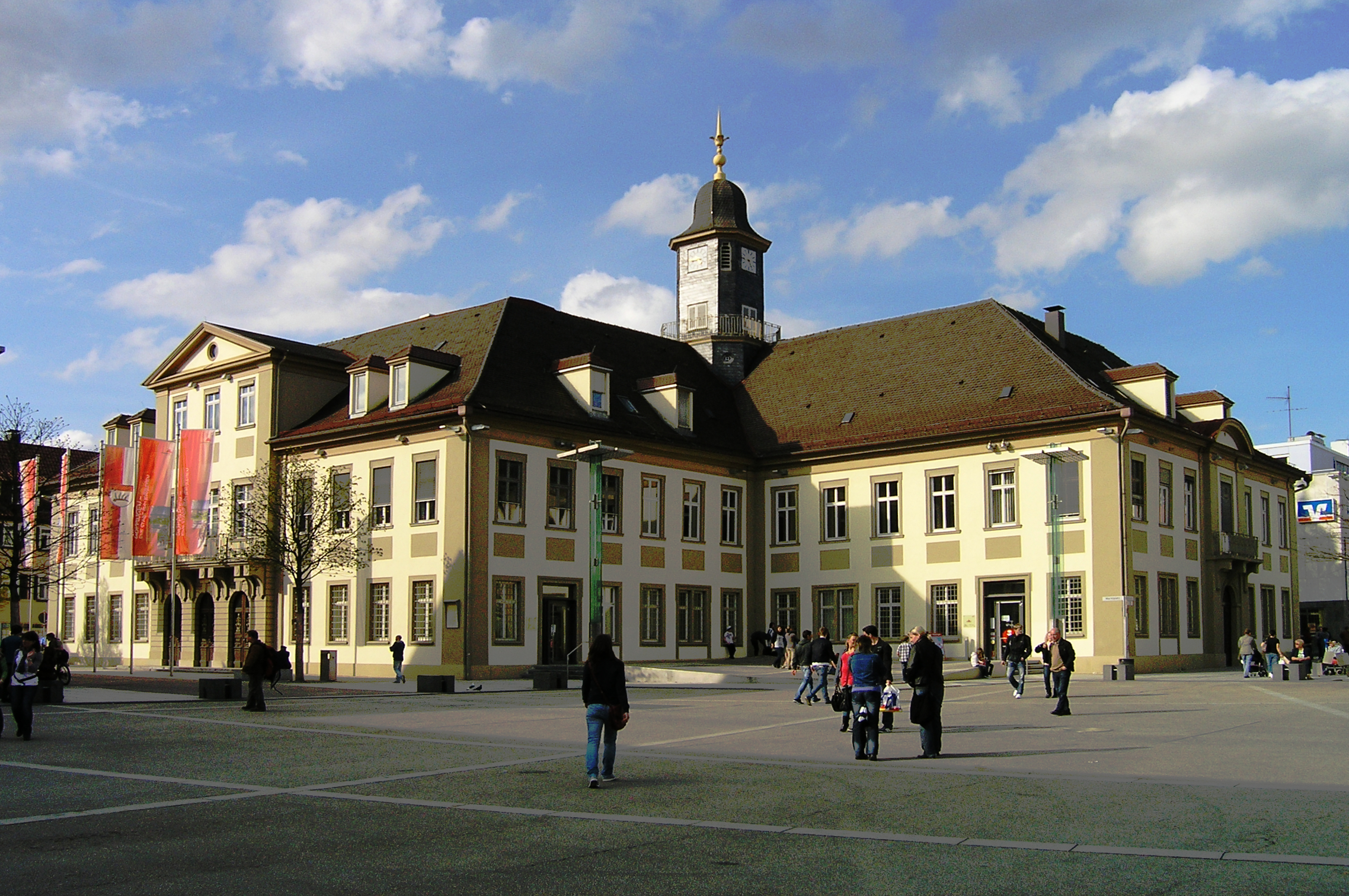
City hall

Göppingen is twinned with:

- Foggia, Italy (1971)
- Klosterneuburg, Austria (1971)
- Pessac, France (2000)
- Sonneberg, Germany (1990)

== Notable people ==
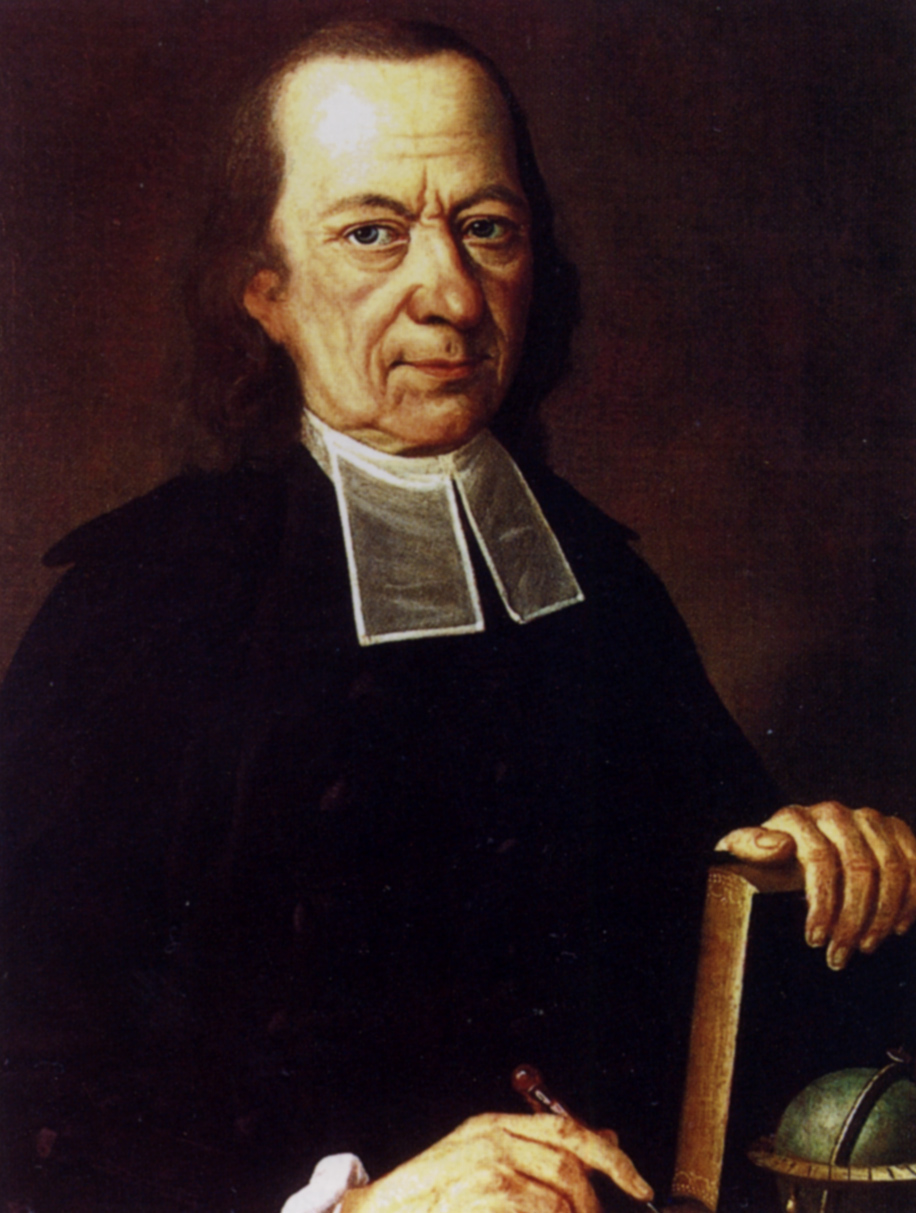
Friedrich Christoph Oetinger, 1775

- Michael Maestlin (1550–1631), mathematician and astronomer, mentor of Johannes Kepler
- Friedrich Christoph Oetinger (1702–1782), theologian, leading pietist.
- Eduard Fuchs (1870–1940), scholar, writer, political activist
- Hugo Borst, (DE Wiki) (1881–1967), private art collector and patron of the arts
- Karl Aberle (1901–1963), publisher and politician (SPD), member of Parliament, co-editor of the Neue Württembergische Zeitung
- Hans Robert Jauss (1921–1997), literary scholar and linguist
- Peter Häberle (1934–2025), legal scholar, constitutional lawyer
- Rolf Sattler (born 1936), Canadian plant morphologist, biologist and philosopher
- Alfred Kirchner (born 1937), actor and theatre director, especially for opera
- F. W. Bernstein (1938–2018), poet, artist and satirist
- Brigitte Russ-Scherer, (DE Wiki) (born 1956), jurist, 1999–2007 mayor of Tübingen (SPD)
- Charles Pelkey (born 1958), journalist, lawyer and politician in Wyoming.

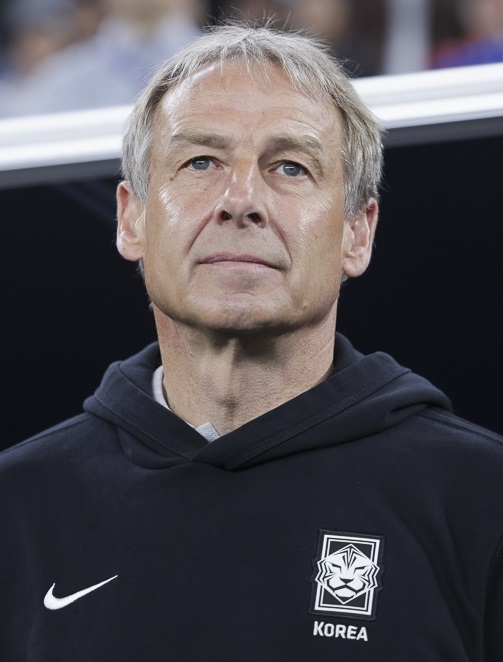
Jürgen Klinsmann, 2024

=== Sport ===
- Adolf Kurz (1888–1959), wrestler, competed at the 1912 Summer Olympics
- Wolfgang Reinhardt (1943–2011), pole vaulter, silver medallist at the 1964 Summer Olympics.
- Jürgen Klinsmann (born 1964), footballer, national coach of German football team, 2004-2006
- Danny Schwarz (born 1975), football coach and former player with 354 caps
- Shane Smeltz (born 1981), a New Zealand former football striker, played 446 games and 58 for New Zealand
- Michael Kraus (born 1983), handball player, played 129 times for Germany
- Ann-Katrin Berger (born 1990), football goalkeeper, has played 17 games for Germany women
- Philipp Raimund (born 2000), ski jumper, 2026 Olympic champion
