= Nürtingen (electoral district) =

Federal electoral district of Germany

262 Nürtingen
- Electoral district for the Bundestag
- Nürtingen in 2025
- State: Baden-Württemberg
- Population: 298,700 (2019)
- Electorate: 205,967 (2021)
- Major settlements: Filderstadt; Kirchheim unter Teck; Leinfelden-Echterdingen
- Area: 465.0 km^{2}

Current electoral district
- Created: 1965
- Party: CDU
- Member: Matthias Hiller
- Elected: 2025

Nürtingen is an electoral constituency (German: Wahlkreis) represented in the Bundestag. It elects one member via first-past-the-post voting. Under the current constituency numbering system, it is designated as constituency 262. It is located in central Baden-Württemberg, comprising the southern part of the Esslingen district.

Nürtingen was created for the 1965 federal election. Since 2002, it has been represented by Michael Hennrich of the Christian Democratic Union (CDU).

== Geography ==
Nürtingen is located in central Baden-Württemberg. As of the 2021 federal election, it comprises entirety of the Esslingen district excluding the municipalities of Aichwald, Altbach, Baltmannsweiler, Deizisau, Denkendorf, Esslingen am Neckar, Hochdorf, Köngen, Lichtenwald, Neuhausen auf den Fildern, Ostfildern, Plochingen, Reichenbach an der Fils, Wendlingen am Neckar, and Wernau. It also contains the municipalities of Steinenbronn and Waldenbuch from the Böblingen district.

== History ==
Nürtingen was created in 1965, then known as Nürtingen – Böblingen. It acquired its current name in the 1980 election. In the 1965 through 1976 elections, it was constituency 170 in the numbering system. In the 1980 through 1998 elections, it was number 166. In the 2002 and 2005 elections, it was number 263. Since the 2009 election, it has been number 262.

Originally, the constituency comprised the Nürtingen district and the Böblingen district excluding the municipalities of Dätzingen, Döffingen, Magstadt, and Sindelfingen. In the 1976 election, it gained the municipalities of Dätzingen and Döffingen while losing the municipalities of Böblingen, Grafenau, Leonberg, Renningen, Rutesheim, Weil der Stadt, and Weissach. In the 1980 election, it acquired a configuration very similar to its current borders, but excluding the municipalities of Steinenbronn und Waldenbuch from the Böblingen district. It acquired its current borders in the 2005 election.

Election	No.	Name	Borders
1965	170	Nürtingen – Böblingen	Nürtingen district; Böblingen district (excluding Dätzingen, Döffingen, Magstadt, and Sindelfingen municipalities)
1969	170	Nürtingen – Böblingen	Nürtingen district; Böblingen district (excluding Dätzingen, Döffingen, Magstadt, and Sindelfingen municipalities)
1972	170	Nürtingen – Böblingen	Nürtingen district; Böblingen district (excluding Dätzingen, Döffingen, Magstadt, and Sindelfingen municipalities)
1976	170	Nürtingen – Böblingen	Nürtingen district; Böblingen district (excluding Böblingen, Grafenau, Leonberg, Magstadt, Renningen, Rutesheim, Sindelfingen, Weil der Stadt, and Weissach municipalities)
1980	166	Nürtingen	Esslingen district (excluding Aichwald, Altbach, Baltmannsweiler, Deizisau, Denkendorf, Esslingen am Neckar, Hochdorf, Köngen, Lichtenwald, Neuhausen auf den Fildern, Ostfildern, Plochingen, Reichenbach an der Fils, Wendlingen am Neckar, and Wernau municipalities)
1983	166	Nürtingen	Esslingen district (excluding Aichwald, Altbach, Baltmannsweiler, Deizisau, Denkendorf, Esslingen am Neckar, Hochdorf, Köngen, Lichtenwald, Neuhausen auf den Fildern, Ostfildern, Plochingen, Reichenbach an der Fils, Wendlingen am Neckar, and Wernau municipalities)
1987	166	Nürtingen	Esslingen district (excluding Aichwald, Altbach, Baltmannsweiler, Deizisau, Denkendorf, Esslingen am Neckar, Hochdorf, Köngen, Lichtenwald, Neuhausen auf den Fildern, Ostfildern, Plochingen, Reichenbach an der Fils, Wendlingen am Neckar, and Wernau municipalities)
1990	166	Nürtingen	Esslingen district (excluding Aichwald, Altbach, Baltmannsweiler, Deizisau, Denkendorf, Esslingen am Neckar, Hochdorf, Köngen, Lichtenwald, Neuhausen auf den Fildern, Ostfildern, Plochingen, Reichenbach an der Fils, Wendlingen am Neckar, and Wernau municipalities)
1994	166	Nürtingen	Esslingen district (excluding Aichwald, Altbach, Baltmannsweiler, Deizisau, Denkendorf, Esslingen am Neckar, Hochdorf, Köngen, Lichtenwald, Neuhausen auf den Fildern, Ostfildern, Plochingen, Reichenbach an der Fils, Wendlingen am Neckar, and Wernau municipalities)
1998	166	Nürtingen	Esslingen district (excluding Aichwald, Altbach, Baltmannsweiler, Deizisau, Denkendorf, Esslingen am Neckar, Hochdorf, Köngen, Lichtenwald, Neuhausen auf den Fildern, Ostfildern, Plochingen, Reichenbach an der Fils, Wendlingen am Neckar, and Wernau municipalities)
2002	263	Nürtingen	Esslingen district (excluding Aichwald, Altbach, Baltmannsweiler, Deizisau, Denkendorf, Esslingen am Neckar, Hochdorf, Köngen, Lichtenwald, Neuhausen auf den Fildern, Ostfildern, Plochingen, Reichenbach an der Fils, Wendlingen am Neckar, and Wernau municipalities)
2005	263	Nürtingen	Esslingen district (excluding Aichwald, Altbach, Baltmannsweiler, Deizisau, Denkendorf, Esslingen am Neckar, Hochdorf, Köngen, Lichtenwald, Neuhausen auf den Fildern, Ostfildern, Plochingen, Reichenbach an der Fils, Wendlingen am Neckar, and Wernau municipalities); Böblingen district (only Steinenbronn and Waldenbuch municipalities)
2009	262	Nürtingen	Esslingen district (excluding Aichwald, Altbach, Baltmannsweiler, Deizisau, Denkendorf, Esslingen am Neckar, Hochdorf, Köngen, Lichtenwald, Neuhausen auf den Fildern, Ostfildern, Plochingen, Reichenbach an der Fils, Wendlingen am Neckar, and Wernau municipalities); Böblingen district (only Steinenbronn and Waldenbuch municipalities)
2013	262	Nürtingen	Esslingen district (excluding Aichwald, Altbach, Baltmannsweiler, Deizisau, Denkendorf, Esslingen am Neckar, Hochdorf, Köngen, Lichtenwald, Neuhausen auf den Fildern, Ostfildern, Plochingen, Reichenbach an der Fils, Wendlingen am Neckar, and Wernau municipalities); Böblingen district (only Steinenbronn and Waldenbuch municipalities)
2017	262	Nürtingen	Esslingen district (excluding Aichwald, Altbach, Baltmannsweiler, Deizisau, Denkendorf, Esslingen am Neckar, Hochdorf, Köngen, Lichtenwald, Neuhausen auf den Fildern, Ostfildern, Plochingen, Reichenbach an der Fils, Wendlingen am Neckar, and Wernau municipalities); Böblingen district (only Steinenbronn and Waldenbuch municipalities)
2021	262	Nürtingen	Esslingen district (excluding Aichwald, Altbach, Baltmannsweiler, Deizisau, Denkendorf, Esslingen am Neckar, Hochdorf, Köngen, Lichtenwald, Neuhausen auf den Fildern, Ostfildern, Plochingen, Reichenbach an der Fils, Wendlingen am Neckar, and Wernau municipalities); Böblingen district (only Steinenbronn and Waldenbuch municipalities)
2025	262	Nürtingen	Esslingen district (excluding Aichwald, Altbach, Baltmannsweiler, Deizisau, Denkendorf, Esslingen am Neckar, Hochdorf, Köngen, Lichtenwald, Neuhausen auf den Fildern, Ostfildern, Plochingen, Reichenbach an der Fils, Wendlingen am Neckar, and Wernau municipalities); Böblingen district (only Steinenbronn and Waldenbuch municipalities)

== Members ==
The constituency has been held continuously by the Christian Democrat Union (CDU) since its creation. It was first represented by Anton Stark from 1965 to 1990, a total of seven consecutive terms. Elmar Müller was representative from 1990 to 2002. Michael Hennrich has been representative since 2002.

Election	Member	Party	%
1965	Anton Stark	CDU	50.1
1969	Anton Stark	CDU	51.3
1972	Anton Stark	CDU	50.8
1976	Anton Stark	CDU	54.3
1980	Anton Stark	CDU	49.2
1983	Anton Stark	CDU	56.9
1987	Anton Stark	CDU	50.1
1990	Elmar Müller	CDU	46.9
1994	Elmar Müller	CDU	48.0
1998	Elmar Müller	CDU	42.9
2002	Michael Hennrich	CDU	45.6
2005	Michael Hennrich	CDU	47.9
2009	Michael Hennrich	CDU	43.3
2013	Michael Hennrich	CDU	51.0
2017	Michael Hennrich	CDU	39.4
2021	Michael Hennrich	CDU	30.1
2025	Matthias Hiller	CDU	37.7

== Election results ==
=== 2025 election ===
Federal election (2025): Nürtingen
Notes:	Blue background denotes the winner of the electorate vote. Pink background denotes a candidate elected from their party list. Yellow background denotes an electorate win by a list member, or other incumbent. A ✓ or ✗ denotes status of any incumbent, win or lose respectively.						
Party	Candidate	Votes	%	±%	Party votes	%	±%
CDU	Matthias Hiller	64,951	37.7	▲7.6	58,091	33.7	▲7.7
SPD	Nils Schmid	28,298	16.4	▼4.6	24,364	14.1	▼6.5
Greens	Matthias Gastel	24,794	14.4	▼3.6	23,364	13.6	▼3.3
FDP	Renata Alt	9,105	5.3	▼8.6	11,503	6.7	▼10.8
AfD	Christof Deutscher	30,578	17.8	▲9.5	31,029	18.0	▲9.3
Left	Clara Meir	9,264	5.4	▲3.0	9,951	5.8	▲3.1
FW	Sebastian Sebastian	5,140	3.0	▲0.6	2,660	1.5	▼0.1
dieBasis				▼2.1	697	0.4	▼1.3
Tierschutzpartei					1,466	0.9	▼0.3
Team Todenhöfer							▼0.5
Pirates							▼0.4
Bündnis C					339	0.2	▼0.1
ÖDP					314	0.2	▼0.1
Volt					1,180	0.7	▲0.5
BD					171	0.1	
Bürgerbewegung							▼0.4
Gesundheitsforschung							▼0.1
Humanists							▼0.1
BSW					6,446	3.7	▼0.1
MLPD				▼0.1	58	0.0	0.0
Informal votes		1,080			780		
Total valid votes		172,130			172,430		
Turnout		173,210	85.1	▲4.6			
CDU hold	Majority			▲7.6			

=== 2021 election ===
Federal election (2021): Nürtingen
Notes:	Blue background denotes the winner of the electorate vote. Pink background denotes a candidate elected from their party list. Yellow background denotes an electorate win by a list member, or other incumbent. A ✓ or ✗ denotes status of any incumbent, win or lose respectively.						
Party	Candidate	Votes	%	±%	Party votes	%	±%
CDU	✓ Michael Hennrich	49,506	30.1	▼9.3	42,826	26.0	▼7.7
SPD	Nils Schmid	34,617	21.0	▲2.0	33,995	20.7	▲5.5
Greens	Matthias Gastel	29,619	18.0	▲3.3	27,702	16.8	▲2.6
FDP	Renata Alt	22,765	13.8	▲4.0	28,807	17.5	▲2.5
AfD	Kerstin Hanske	13,597	8.3	▼3.7	14,327	8.7	▼3.6
Left	Hüseyin Sahin	3,970	2.4	▼2.4	4,357	2.6	▼2.8
FW	Markus Mangold	3,948	2.4		2,704	1.6	▲0.9
dieBasis	Ilona Timmermann	3,417	2.1		2,773	1.7	
Tierschutzpartei					1,898	1.2	▲0.2
PARTEI	Daniel Friesch	2,428	1.5		1,442	0.9	▲0.2
Team Todenhöfer					890	0.5	
Pirates					576	0.4	▼0.1
Bündnis C					467	0.3	
ÖDP					384	0.2	0.0
Volt					325	0.2	
DiB	Sigrid Ott	513	0.3		250	0.2	0.0
Bürgerbewegung					209	0.1	
Gesundheitsforschung					182	0.1	
Humanists					139	0.1	
NPD					122	0.1	▼0.1
Bündnis 21					63	0.0	
MLPD	Dieter Rupp	95	0.1	▼0.1	55	0.0	0.0
LKR					45	0.0	
DKP					32	0.0	0.0
Informal votes		1,302			1,207		
Total valid votes		164,475			164,570		
Turnout		165,777	80.5	▼0.7			
CDU hold	Majority	14,889	9.1	▼11.3			

=== 2017 election ===
Federal election (2017): Nürtingen
Notes:	Blue background denotes the winner of the electorate vote. Pink background denotes a candidate elected from their party list. Yellow background denotes an electorate win by a list member, or other incumbent. A ✓ or ✗ denotes status of any incumbent, win or lose respectively.						
Party	Candidate	Votes	%	±%	Party votes	%	±%
CDU	✓ Michael Hennrich	65,566	39.4	▼11.5	56,105	33.7	▼12.3
SPD	Nils Schmid	31,655	19.0	▼6.2	25,190	15.1	▼4.8
Greens	Matthias Gastel	24,540	14.8	▲4.9	23,673	14.2	▲2.6
AfD	Vera Kosova	19,833	11.9	▲8.7	20,544	12.3	▲7.5
FDP	Renata Alt	16,390	9.9	▲7.3	24,922	15.0	▲8.1
Left	Heinrich Brinker	7,978	4.8	▲1.5	9,132	5.5	▲1.4
Tierschutzpartei					1,544	0.9	▲0.1
FW					1,189	0.7	▲0.1
PARTEI					1,107	0.7	
Pirates					811	0.5	▼1.8
ÖDP					411	0.2	▼0.1
NPD					373	0.2	▼0.5
Tierschutzallianz					317	0.2	
DiB					293	0.2	
DM					259	0.2	
BGE					226	0.1	
V-Partei³					161	0.1	
Menschliche Welt					148	0.1	
MLPD	Joachim Bauerle	325	0.2		121	0.1	0.0
DIE RECHTE					68	0.0	
DKP					15	0.0	
Informal votes		1,765			1,443		
Total valid votes		166,287			166,609		
Turnout		168,052	81.2	▲3.4			
CDU hold	Majority	33,911	20.4	▼5.3			

=== 2013 election ===
Federal election (2013): Nürtingen
Notes:	Blue background denotes the winner of the electorate vote. Pink background denotes a candidate elected from their party list. Yellow background denotes an electorate win by a list member, or other incumbent. A ✓ or ✗ denotes status of any incumbent, win or lose respectively.						
Party	Candidate	Votes	%	±%	Party votes	%	±%
CDU	✓ Michael Hennrich	80,710	51.0	▲7.6	72,844	46.0	▲12.5
SPD	Rainer Arnold	40,013	25.3	▲1.1	31,499	19.9	▲1.0
Greens	Matthias Gastel	15,685	9.9	▼3.9	18,435	11.6	▼3.3
Left	Claudia Haydt	5,205	3.3	▼1.9	6,533	4.1	▼1.5
AfD	Peter Friedrich	5,055	3.2		7,599	4.8	
FDP	Renata Alt	3,997	2.5	▼9.1	10,880	6.9	▼13.8
Pirates	Jan Lüdtke-Reißmann	3,238	2.0		3,602	2.3	▲0.6
REP	Ulrich Deuschle	2,127	1.3		1,744	1.1	▼0.6
Tierschutzpartei					1,233	0.8	▲0.3
NPD	René Schrade	1,201	0.8	▼1.0	1,181	0.7	▼0.2
FW	Emmerich Benkowitsch	1,142	0.7		915	0.6	
ÖDP					476	0.3	0.0
RENTNER					387	0.2	
PBC					370	0.2	▼0.2
Volksabstimmung					320	0.2	▼0.1
PRO					128	0.1	
BIG					112	0.1	
Party of Reason					99	0.1	
MLPD					59	0.0	0.0
BüSo					10	0.0	▼0.1
Informal votes		1,680			1,627		
Total valid votes		158,373			158,426		
Turnout		160,053	77.8	▲1.9			
CDU hold	Majority	40,697	25.7	▲6.6			

=== 2009 election ===
Federal election (2009): Nürtingen
Notes:	Blue background denotes the winner of the electorate vote. Pink background denotes a candidate elected from their party list. Yellow background denotes an electorate win by a list member, or other incumbent. A ✓ or ✗ denotes status of any incumbent, win or lose respectively.						
Party	Candidate	Votes	%	±%	Party votes	%	±%
CDU	✓ Michael Hennrich	66,116	43.3	▼4.6	51,146	33.4	▼5.4
SPD	Rainer Arnold	36,910	24.2	▼9.7	28,943	18.9	▼10.2
Greens	Andreas Schwarz	21,104	13.8	▲4.8	22,902	15.0	▲3.8
FDP	Judith Skudelny	17,768	11.6	▲6.6	31,686	20.7	▲7.4
Left	Jochen Findeisen	7,973	5.2	▲2.6	8,661	5.7	▲2.8
REP					2,651	1.7	▼0.2
Pirates					2,552	1.7	
NPD	Heidi Drinkard	2,647	1.7	▲0.2	1,411	0.9	▲0.1
Tierschutzpartei					787	0.5	
PBC					701	0.5	▼0.2
Volksabstimmung					502	0.3	
ÖDP					413	0.3	
DIE VIOLETTEN					275	0.2	
ADM					100	0.1	
BüSo					94	0.1	0.0
MLPD					88	0.1	0.0
DVU					59	0.0	
Informal votes		2,431			1,978		
Total valid votes		152,518			152,971		
Turnout		154,949	75.9	▼6.0			
CDU hold	Majority	29,206	19.1	▲5.1			

=== 2005 election ===
Federal election (2005): Nürtingen
Notes:	Blue background denotes the winner of the electorate vote. Pink background denotes a candidate elected from their party list. Yellow background denotes an electorate win by a list member, or other incumbent. A ✓ or ✗ denotes status of any incumbent, win or lose respectively.						
Party	Candidate	Votes	%	±%	Party votes	%	±%
CDU	✓ Michael Hennrich	77,838	47.9	▲2.2	63,260	38.9	▼3.6
SPD	Rainer Arnold	54,989	33.9	▼3.1	47,452	29.1	▼3.8
Greens	Ursula Eid	14,650	9.0	▼1.1	18,130	11.1	▼0.5
FDP	Ellen Winkler-Oberman	8,136	5.0	▼1.1	21,741	13.4	▲5.0
Left	Jochen Findeisen	4,261	2.6	▲2.6	4,707	2.9	▲2.2
REP					3,187	2.0	▲0.4
NPD	Markus Krug	2,569	1.6		1,300	0.8	▲0.6
Familie					1,065	0.7	
PBC					1,007	0.6	0.0
GRAUEN					706	0.4	▲0.3
MLPD					154	0.1	
BüSo					86	0.1	
Informal votes		2,501			2,149		
Total valid votes		162,443			162,795		
Turnout		164,944	82.0	▼2.0			
CDU hold	Majority	22,849	14				
