= Esslingen (Bundestag electoral district) =

Federal electoral district of Germany

261 Esslingen
- Electoral district for the Bundestag
- Esslingen in 2025
- State: Baden-Württemberg
- Population: 251,600 (2019)
- Electorate: 166,628 (2021)
- Major settlements: Esslingen am Neckar; Ostfildern; Plochingen
- Area: 208.7 km^{2}

Current electoral district
- Created: 1949
- Party: CDU
- Member: Markus Grübel
- Elected: 2002, 2005, 2009, 2013, 2017, 2021, 2025

Esslingen is an electoral constituency (German: Wahlkreis) represented in the Bundestag. It elects one member via first-past-the-post voting. Under the current constituency numbering system, it is designated as constituency 261. It is located in central Baden-Württemberg, comprising the northern part of the Esslingen district.

Esslingen was created for the inaugural 1949 federal election. From 2002 to 2025, it was represented by Markus Grübel of the Christian Democratic Union (CDU). Since 2025 it has been represented by David Preisendanz of the CDU.

== Geography ==
Esslingen is located in central Baden-Württemberg. As of the 2021 federal election, it comprises municipalities of Aichwald, Altbach, Baltmannsweiler, Deizisau, Denkendorf, Esslingen am Neckar, Hochdorf, Köngen, Lichtenwald, Neuhausen auf den Fildern, Ostfildern, Plochingen, Reichenbach an der Fils, Wendlingen am Neckar, and Wernau from the Esslingen district.

== History ==
Esslingen was created in 1949, then known as Eßlingen. It acquired its current name in the 1980 election. In the 1949 election, it was Württemberg-Baden Landesbezirk Württemberg constituency 6 in the numbering system. In the 1953 through 1961 elections, it was number 168. In the 1965 through 1976 elections, it was number 171. In the 1980 through 1998 elections, it was number 165. In the 2002 and 2005 elections, it was number 262. Since the 2009 election, it has been number 261.

Originally, the constituency comprised the Eßlingen district and the municipalities of Aichtal, Altdorf, Altenriet, Bempflingen, Beuren, Erkenbrechtsweiler, Frickenhausen, Grafenberg, Großbettlingen, Nürtingen, Neuffen, Kohlberg, Neckartailfingen, Neckartenzlingen, Oberboihingen, Schlaitdorf, and Unterensingen from the Nürtingen district. In the 1965 through 1976 elections, it was coterminous with the Eßlingen district. It acquired its current borders in the 1980 election.

Election	No.	Name	Borders
1949	6	Eßlingen	Eßlingen district; Nürtingen district (only Aichtal, Altdorf, Altenriet, Bempflingen, Beuren, Erkenbrechtsweiler, Frickenhausen, Grafenberg, Großbettlingen, Nürtingen, Neuffen, Kohlberg, Neckartailfingen, Neckartenzlingen, Oberboihingen, Schlaitdorf, and Unterensingen municipalities)
1953	168	Eßlingen	Eßlingen district; Nürtingen district (only Aichtal, Altdorf, Altenriet, Bempflingen, Beuren, Erkenbrechtsweiler, Frickenhausen, Grafenberg, Großbettlingen, Nürtingen, Neuffen, Kohlberg, Neckartailfingen, Neckartenzlingen, Oberboihingen, Schlaitdorf, and Unterensingen municipalities)
1957	168	Eßlingen	Eßlingen district; Nürtingen district (only Aichtal, Altdorf, Altenriet, Bempflingen, Beuren, Erkenbrechtsweiler, Frickenhausen, Grafenberg, Großbettlingen, Nürtingen, Neuffen, Kohlberg, Neckartailfingen, Neckartenzlingen, Oberboihingen, Schlaitdorf, and Unterensingen municipalities)
1961	168	Eßlingen	Eßlingen district; Nürtingen district (only Aichtal, Altdorf, Altenriet, Bempflingen, Beuren, Erkenbrechtsweiler, Frickenhausen, Grafenberg, Großbettlingen, Nürtingen, Neuffen, Kohlberg, Neckartailfingen, Neckartenzlingen, Oberboihingen, Schlaitdorf, and Unterensingen municipalities)
1965	171	Eßlingen	Eßlingen district
1969	171	Eßlingen	Eßlingen district
1972	171	Eßlingen	Eßlingen district
1976	171	Eßlingen	Eßlingen district
1980	165	Esslingen	Esslingen district (only Aichwald, Altbach, Baltmannsweiler, Deizisau, Denkendorf, Esslingen am Neckar, Hochdorf, Köngen, Lichtenwald, Neuhausen auf den Fildern, Ostfildern, Plochingen, Reichenbach an der Fils, Wendlingen am Neckar, and Wernau municipalities)
1983	165	Esslingen	Esslingen district (only Aichwald, Altbach, Baltmannsweiler, Deizisau, Denkendorf, Esslingen am Neckar, Hochdorf, Köngen, Lichtenwald, Neuhausen auf den Fildern, Ostfildern, Plochingen, Reichenbach an der Fils, Wendlingen am Neckar, and Wernau municipalities)
1987	165	Esslingen	Esslingen district (only Aichwald, Altbach, Baltmannsweiler, Deizisau, Denkendorf, Esslingen am Neckar, Hochdorf, Köngen, Lichtenwald, Neuhausen auf den Fildern, Ostfildern, Plochingen, Reichenbach an der Fils, Wendlingen am Neckar, and Wernau municipalities)
1990	165	Esslingen	Esslingen district (only Aichwald, Altbach, Baltmannsweiler, Deizisau, Denkendorf, Esslingen am Neckar, Hochdorf, Köngen, Lichtenwald, Neuhausen auf den Fildern, Ostfildern, Plochingen, Reichenbach an der Fils, Wendlingen am Neckar, and Wernau municipalities)
1994	165	Esslingen	Esslingen district (only Aichwald, Altbach, Baltmannsweiler, Deizisau, Denkendorf, Esslingen am Neckar, Hochdorf, Köngen, Lichtenwald, Neuhausen auf den Fildern, Ostfildern, Plochingen, Reichenbach an der Fils, Wendlingen am Neckar, and Wernau municipalities)
1998	165	Esslingen	Esslingen district (only Aichwald, Altbach, Baltmannsweiler, Deizisau, Denkendorf, Esslingen am Neckar, Hochdorf, Köngen, Lichtenwald, Neuhausen auf den Fildern, Ostfildern, Plochingen, Reichenbach an der Fils, Wendlingen am Neckar, and Wernau municipalities)
2002	262	Esslingen	Esslingen district (only Aichwald, Altbach, Baltmannsweiler, Deizisau, Denkendorf, Esslingen am Neckar, Hochdorf, Köngen, Lichtenwald, Neuhausen auf den Fildern, Ostfildern, Plochingen, Reichenbach an der Fils, Wendlingen am Neckar, and Wernau municipalities)
2005	262	Esslingen	Esslingen district (only Aichwald, Altbach, Baltmannsweiler, Deizisau, Denkendorf, Esslingen am Neckar, Hochdorf, Köngen, Lichtenwald, Neuhausen auf den Fildern, Ostfildern, Plochingen, Reichenbach an der Fils, Wendlingen am Neckar, and Wernau municipalities)
2009	261	Esslingen	Esslingen district (only Aichwald, Altbach, Baltmannsweiler, Deizisau, Denkendorf, Esslingen am Neckar, Hochdorf, Köngen, Lichtenwald, Neuhausen auf den Fildern, Ostfildern, Plochingen, Reichenbach an der Fils, Wendlingen am Neckar, and Wernau municipalities)
2013	261	Esslingen	Esslingen district (only Aichwald, Altbach, Baltmannsweiler, Deizisau, Denkendorf, Esslingen am Neckar, Hochdorf, Köngen, Lichtenwald, Neuhausen auf den Fildern, Ostfildern, Plochingen, Reichenbach an der Fils, Wendlingen am Neckar, and Wernau municipalities)
2017	261	Esslingen	Esslingen district (only Aichwald, Altbach, Baltmannsweiler, Deizisau, Denkendorf, Esslingen am Neckar, Hochdorf, Köngen, Lichtenwald, Neuhausen auf den Fildern, Ostfildern, Plochingen, Reichenbach an der Fils, Wendlingen am Neckar, and Wernau municipalities)
2021	261	Esslingen	Esslingen district (only Aichwald, Altbach, Baltmannsweiler, Deizisau, Denkendorf, Esslingen am Neckar, Hochdorf, Köngen, Lichtenwald, Neuhausen auf den Fildern, Ostfildern, Plochingen, Reichenbach an der Fils, Wendlingen am Neckar, and Wernau municipalities)
2025	261	Esslingen	Esslingen district (only Aichwald, Altbach, Baltmannsweiler, Deizisau, Denkendorf, Esslingen am Neckar, Hochdorf, Köngen, Lichtenwald, Neuhausen auf den Fildern, Ostfildern, Plochingen, Reichenbach an der Fils, Wendlingen am Neckar, and Wernau municipalities)

== Members ==
The constituency has been held by the Christian Democratic Union (CDU) during all but four Bundestag terms since its creation. It was first represented by Franz Ott from 1949 to 1953; Ott was one of three independents elected to the first Bundestag. Thomas Ruf of the CDU won it in 1953 and served until 1972, when Volker Hauff of the Social Democratic Party (SPD) was elected. Gerd Langguth regained it for the CDU in 1976, but Hauff was elected again in 1980. Otto Hauser won it for the CDU in 1983 and served until 1998, when Siegmar Mosdorf of the SPD was elected. Markus Grübel of the CDU has been representative since 2002.

Election	Member	Party	%
1949	Franz Ott	Ind.	28.0
1953	Thomas Ruf	CDU	43.2
1957	Thomas Ruf	CDU	49.6
1961	Thomas Ruf	CDU	39.0
1965	Thomas Ruf	CDU	48.8
1969	Thomas Ruf	CDU	46.6
1972	Volker Hauff	SPD	49.1
1976	Gerd Langguth	CDU	48.7
1980	Volker Hauff	SPD	47.6
1983	Otto Hauser	CDU	50.7
1987	Otto Hauser	CDU	50.8
1990	Otto Hauser	CDU	49.3
1994	Otto Hauser	CDU	47.3
1998	Siegmar Mosdorf	SPD	45.9
2002	Markus Grübel	CDU	45.0
2005	Markus Grübel	CDU	46.8
2009	Markus Grübel	CDU	43.5
2013	Markus Grübel	CDU	51.3
2017	Markus Grübel	CDU	40.0
2021	Markus Grübel	CDU	32.0

== Election results ==
=== 2025 election ===
Federal election (2025): Esslingen
Notes:	Blue background denotes the winner of the electorate vote. Pink background denotes a candidate elected from their party list. Yellow background denotes an electorate win by a list member, or other incumbent. A ✓ or ✗ denotes status of any incumbent, win or lose respectively.						
Party	Candidate	Votes	%	±%	Party votes	%	±%
CDU	David Preisendanz	51,329	37.0	▲5.0	45,133	32.5	▲7.2
SPD	Argyri Paraschaki-Schauer	22,446	16.2	▼5.6	21,535	15.5	▼7.3
AfD	Stefan Wischniowski	21,754	15.7	▲8.7	22,298	16.1	▲8.6
Greens	Sebastian Schäfer	21,500	15.5	▼2.9	20,809	15.0	▼3.2
Left	Martin Auerbach	9,177	6.6	▲4.0	9,942	7.2	▲4.1
FDP	Laura Hahn	6,021	4.9	▼7.9	7,967	5.7	▼10.2
BSW					5,359	3.9	
FW	Rafael Gawenda	3,479	2.5	▲0.3	1,877	1.4	▼0.1
Volt	David Althaus	1,789	1.3	▲0.9	1,098	0.8	▲0.5
Tierschutzpartei					1,124	0.8	▼0.3
dieBasis	Shpresa Nreca-Bisinger	1,104	0.8	▼0.9	493	0.4	▼1.1
PARTEI				▼1.3	571	0.4	▼0.4
ÖDP					223	0.2	▼0.1
Bündnis C					153	0.1	0.0
BD					137	0.1	
MLPD					83	0.1	0.0
Team Todenhöfer							▼0.7
Pirates							▼0.3
Humanists				▼0.2			▼0.1
Gesundheitsforschung							▼0.1
Informal votes		778			584		
Total valid votes		138,608			138,802		
Turnout		139,386	84.3	▲5.1			
CDU hold	Majority	28,883	20.8	▲10.2			

=== 2021 election ===
Federal election (2021): Esslingen
Notes:	Blue background denotes the winner of the electorate vote. Pink background denotes a candidate elected from their party list. Yellow background denotes an electorate win by a list member, or other incumbent. A ✓ or ✗ denotes status of any incumbent, win or lose respectively.						
Party	Candidate	Votes	%	±%	Party votes	%	±%
CDU	✓ Markus Grübel	41,976	32.0	▼8.0	33,175	25.3	▼8.0
SPD	Argyri Paraschaki	28,501	21.8	▲2.6	29,852	22.8	▲6.0
Greens	Sebastian Schäfer	24,058	18.4	▲3.1	23,902	18.2	▲3.7
FDP	Robert Langer	16,011	12.2	▲3.5	20,901	15.9	▲2.2
AfD	Boris Malewski	9,123	7.0	▼3.8	9,733	7.4	▼3.5
Left	Anil Beşli	3,477	2.7	▼3.2	4,063	3.1	▼3.1
FW	Holger Fritz	2,844	2.2		1,969	1.5	▲0.8
dieBasis	Stefan Zweifel	2,256	1.7		1,928	1.5	
Tierschutzpartei					1,457	1.1	▲0.2
PARTEI	Daniela Negt	1,758	1.3		1,113	0.8	▲0.1
Team Todenhöfer					943	0.7	
Pirates					395	0.3	▼0.2
Volt	Andreas Jakobi	504	0.4		366	0.3	
ÖDP					329	0.3	0.0
Bündnis C					185	0.1	
Humanists	Wolfgang Hamberger	306	0.2		186	0.1	
Gesundheitsforschung					161	0.1	
Bürgerbewegung					120	0.1	
DiB					91	0.1	▼0.1
MLPD	Hubert Bauer	206	0.2	▼0.1	95	0.1	▼0.1
NPD					82	0.1	▼0.2
LKR					29	0.0	
Bündnis 21					25	0.0	
DKP					21	0.0	0.0
Informal votes		868			767		
Total valid votes		131,020			131,121		
Turnout		131,888	79.2	▼1.1			
CDU hold	Majority	13,475	10.2	▼10.6			

=== 2017 election ===
Federal election (2017): Esslingen
Notes:	Blue background denotes the winner of the electorate vote. Pink background denotes a candidate elected from their party list. Yellow background denotes an electorate win by a list member, or other incumbent. A ✓ or ✗ denotes status of any incumbent, win or lose respectively.						
Party	Candidate	Votes	%	±%	Party votes	%	±%
CDU	✓ Markus Grübel	53,665	40.0	▼11.2	44,748	33.3	▼11.5
SPD	Regina Rapp	25,697	19.2	▼6.1	22,579	16.8	▼5.1
Greens	Stephanie Reinhold	20,501	15.3	▲4.2	19,565	14.6	▲2.5
AfD	Stephan Köthe	14,390	10.7	▲7.7	14,692	10.9	▲6.4
FDP	Sven Kobbelt	11,657	8.7	▲6.8	18,512	13.8	▲7.7
Left	Martin Auerbach	7,853	5.9	▲2.1	8,361	6.2	▲1.7
Tierschutzpartei					1,243	0.9	▲0.1
FW					992	0.7	▲0.2
PARTEI					979	0.7	
Pirates					708	0.5	▼1.7
ÖDP					314	0.2	0.0
NPD					290	0.2	▼0.5
Tierschutzallianz					266	0.2	
BGE					223	0.1	
DiB					202	0.2	
DM					187	0.1	
V-Partei³					178	0.1	
MLPD	Gabriele Conrad	355	0.3		171	0.1	0.0
Menschliche Welt					140	0.1	
DIE RECHTE					27	0.0	
DKP					8	0.0	
Informal votes		1,361			1,094		
Total valid votes		134,118			134,385		
Turnout		135,479	80.3	▲2.6			
CDU hold	Majority	27,968	20.8	▼5.3			

=== 2013 election ===
Federal election (2013): Esslingen
Notes:	Blue background denotes the winner of the electorate vote. Pink background denotes a candidate elected from their party list. Yellow background denotes an electorate win by a list member, or other incumbent. A ✓ or ✗ denotes status of any incumbent, win or lose respectively.						
Party	Candidate	Votes	%	±%	Party votes	%	±%
CDU	✓ Markus Grübel	65,825	51.3	▲7.8	57,598	44.8	▲11.2
SPD	Michael Wechsler	32,379	25.2	▼3.4	28,205	21.9	▲1.2
Greens	Jürgen Menzel	14,236	11.1	▼1.4	15,483	12.0	▼3.6
Left	Stefan Dreher	4,788	3.7	▼1.3	5,862	4.6	▼1.6
AfD	Anna Schupeck	3,871	3.0		5,835	4.5	
Pirates	Marco Hauke	2,936	2.3		2,871	2.2	▲0.6
FDP	Stefan Schreckenbauer	2,474	1.9	▼6.8	7,859	6.1	▼12.3
Tierschutzpartei					1,110	0.9	▲0.4
REP	Eberhard Köhler	1,004	0.8		873	0.7	▼0.6
NPD	Martin Krämer	912	0.7	▼0.7	880	0.7	▼0.2
FW					647	0.5	
ÖDP					302	0.2	0.0
RENTNER					245	0.2	
PBC					165	0.1	▼0.1
Volksabstimmung					152	0.1	▼0.1
BIG					143	0.1	
MLPD					111	0.1	0.0
Party of Reason					89	0.1	
PRO					88	0.1	
BüSo					18	0.0	0.0
Informal votes		1,275			1,164		
Total valid votes		128,425			128,536		
Turnout		129,700	77.7	▲1.7			
CDU hold	Majority	33,446	26.1	▲11.2			

=== 2009 election ===
Federal election (2009): Esslingen
Notes:	Blue background denotes the winner of the electorate vote. Pink background denotes a candidate elected from their party list. Yellow background denotes an electorate win by a list member, or other incumbent. A ✓ or ✗ denotes status of any incumbent, win or lose respectively.						
Party	Candidate	Votes	%	±%	Party votes	%	±%
CDU	✓ Markus Grübel	53,829	43.5	▼3.4	41,672	33.6	▼4.4
SPD	Karin Roth	35,396	28.6	▼10.6	25,797	20.8	▼10.9
Greens	Andrea Lindlohr	15,511	12.5	▲5.9	19,402	15.6	▲4.1
FDP	Rena Farquhar	10,819	8.7	▲5.7	22,873	18.4	▲6.6
Left	Rainer Hauenschild	6,225	5.0	▲2.2	7,680	6.2	▲3.0
Pirates					2,051	1.7	
REP					1,601	1.3	▼0.3
NPD	Karin Feindt	1,768	1.4	0.0	1,069	0.9	▲0.1
Tierschutzpartei					582	0.5	
ÖDP					351	0.3	
PBC					275	0.2	▼0.1
Volksabstimmung					239	0.2	
DIE VIOLETTEN					210	0.2	
MLPD	Dorothea Jauernig	299	0.2		148	0.1	0.0
BüSo					68	0.1	0.0
ADM					50	0.0	
DVU					40	0.0	
Informal votes		1,711			1,450		
Total valid votes		123,847			124,108		
Turnout		125,558	76.0	▼5.9			
CDU hold	Majority	18,433	14.9	▲7.2			

=== 2005 election ===
Federal election (2005): Esslingen
Notes:	Blue background denotes the winner of the electorate vote. Pink background denotes a candidate elected from their party list. Yellow background denotes an electorate win by a list member, or other incumbent. A ✓ or ✗ denotes status of any incumbent, win or lose respectively.						
Party	Candidate	Votes	%	±%	Party votes	%	±%
CDU	✓ Markus Grübel	61,861	46.8	▲1.9	50,235	37.9	▼2.8
SPD	Karin Roth	51,793	39.2	▼2.4	41,987	31.7	▼3.7
Greens	Antje Vogel-Sperl	8,742	6.6	▼0.7	15,219	11.5	▼0.2
FDP	Manuel Okolisan	4,063	3.1	▼1.5	15,639	11.8	▲4.1
Left	Siegfired Deuschle	3,739	2.8	▲2.0	4,178	3.2	▲2.3
REP					2,099	1.6	▲0.2
NPD	Heidi Drinkard	1,897	1.4		979	0.7	▲0.6
Familie					758	0.6	
GRAUEN					578	0.4	▲0.2
PBC					451	0.3	
MLPD					183	0.1	
BüSo					74	0.1	
Informal votes		1,794			1,509		
Total valid votes		132,095			132,380		
Turnout		133,889	81.8	▼1.8			
CDU hold	Majority	10,068	7.6				
