= Alexander Föhr =

German politician (born 1980)

Member of the Bundestag; for Nürtingen
- In office 1 March 2023 – 25 March 2025
- Preceded by: Michael Hennrich
- Succeeded by: Matthias Hiller

Personal details
- Born: 1 August 1980 (age 45) Heidelberg, West Germany
- Party: Christian Democratic Union
- Children: 3
- Education: University of Mainz

Alexander Paul Föhr (born 1 August 1980) is a German politician from the Christian Democratic Union. Since 2023, he has been a Member of the German Bundestag from the state of Baden-Württemberg.

== Biography ==
Föhr passed his Abitur at the Heidelberg Bunsen-Gymnasium in Heidelberg in 2000. He then completed military service with the Anti-Aircraft Gun Battalion 12 in Hardheim. Between 2001 and 2008 he studied political science, public law and history at the University of Mainz. He graduated with a master's degree. From 2008 to 2012 he worked in the department of Mayor Eckart Würzner at the City of Heidelberg. Until he entered the Bundestag in 2023, he was Head of Communications and Politics at the AOK Baden-Württemberg .

Föhr is married, has three children and lives in Heidelberg.

== Political career ==
Foehr is a member of the CDU. He has been a member of the municipal council of Heidelberg since 2014. He has been the district chairman of the CDU in Heidelberg since 2015. He is also a member of the district board of the CDU Nordbaden.

Föhr ran as a candidate in the 2021 German federal election in the federal constituency of Heidelberg, but initially failed to get into the Bundestag. On 1 March 2023, he replaced Michael Hennrich in the Bundestag when he resigned.
