= Matthias Gastel =

German politician (born 1970)

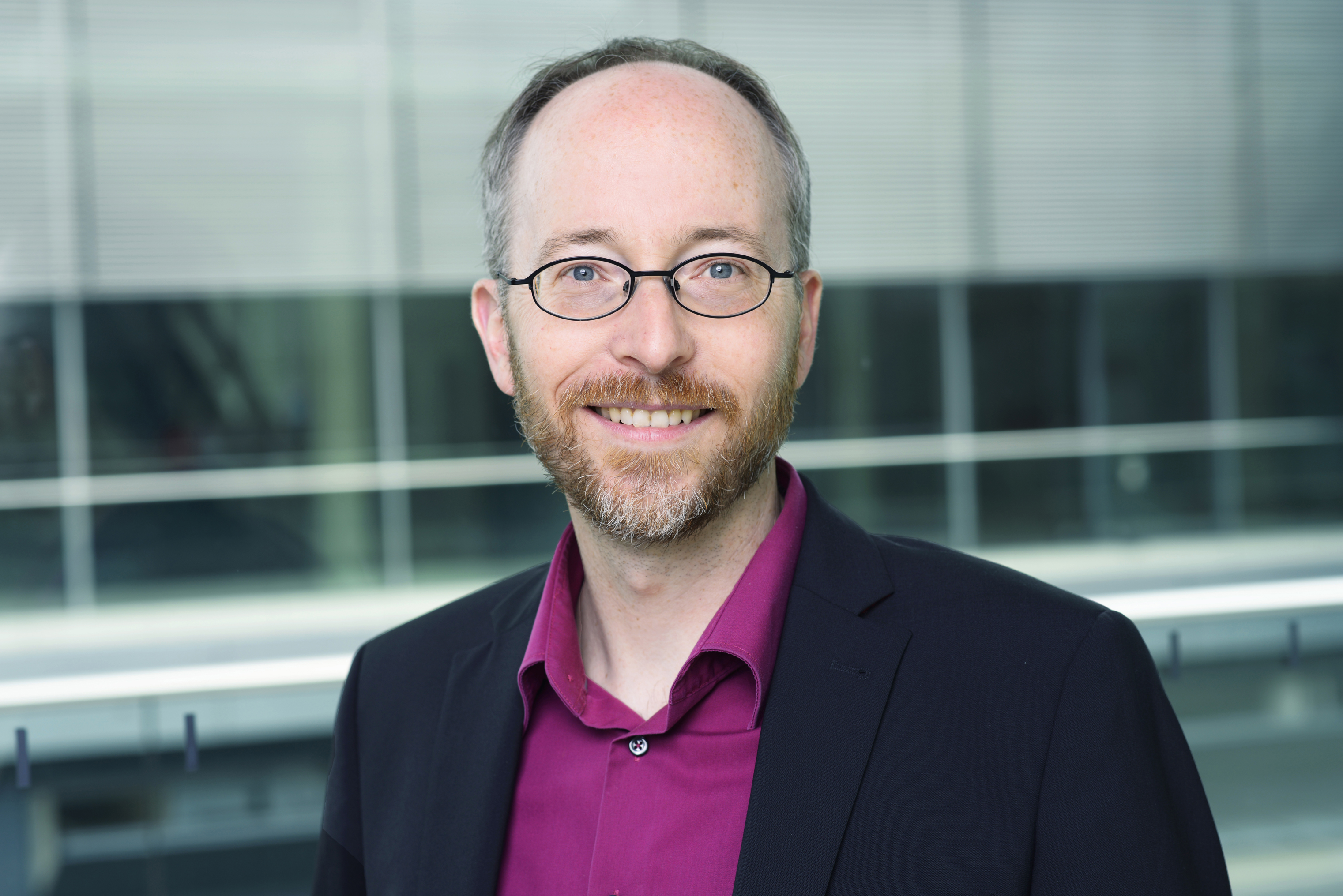
- Gastel in 2020

Member of the Bundestag
- Incumbent
- Assumed office 2013

Personal details
- Born: 26 December 1970 (age 55) Stuttgart
- Party: Alliance 90/The Greens – Greens

Matthias Gastel (born 26 December 1970, Stuttgart) is a German politician of Alliance 90/The Greens who has been serving as a member of the Bundestag since 2013.

== Early life and education ==
Gastel initially completed a commercial apprenticeship and did his civil service in a youth welfare facility with a special school. He completed a one-year vocational training in geriatric care. Finally, he studied social pedagogy in Reutlingen and later part-time business administration in the form of a correspondence course.

For ten years, Gastel worked in in-patient youth welfare (home education) until he initially became self-employed as a personnel service provider in 2006. After his business was continued by another company, he became self-employed again in the field of business mediation. He also works as a practical teacher in the training of educators.

== Political career ==
Gastel joined the Green Party (now Alliance 90/The Greens – Bündnis 90/Die Grünen) in 1989. From 1994 to 2014, he was a member of the Filderstadt municipal council and served as parliamentary group chairman of the Greens there. From 1999 to 2014, he was also a member of the district council in Esslingen. In the 2011 Baden-Württemberg state election, he ran as the second candidate of Winfried Kretschmann, who was elected Minister President.

In the 2013 federal election, Gastel ran in the electoral district of Nürtingen and entered the German Bundestag via the state list, as well as in the 2017 federal election. At the 2017 party conference in Berlin, he got into a dispute with Kretschmann over the goal of allowing only zero-emission cars from 2030. A video of the dispute was circulated on the internet.

In parliament, Gastel has been serving on the Committee on Transport and Digital Infrastructure, where he is his parliamentary group's spokesperson on railways. In addition, he is a substitute member of the Committee on Tourism and the Committee on Food and Agriculture. Matthias Gastel is committed to the introduction of the Deutschlandtakt.

In the negotiations to form a so-called traffic light coalition of the Social Democratic Party (SPD), the Green Party and the Free Democratic Party (FDP) following the 2021 German elections, Gastel was part of his party's delegation in the working group on mobility, co-chaired by Anke Rehlinger, Anton Hofreiter and Oliver Luksic.

=== Stuttgart 21 ===
As part of the protests against the Stuttgart 21 rail project, Gastel co-founded the "Ja zum Ausstieg aus Stuttgart 21" alliance in Filderstadt and is considered one of the most prominent critics, especially of the reduction from 16 tracks of the terminus station to eight tracks in the new underground station. Contrary to the railroads, Gastel advocates a longer preservation of the inner-city inclined section of the Gäubahn until its continuous connection to the airport station has been ensured.

In addition to the expansion of the Gäubahn, Gastel also advocates the ring connection of the S-Bahn between Böblingen and Kirchheim unter Teck.

== Other activities ==
- DB Netz, Member of the Supervisory Board (since 2022)
- Federal Network Agency for Electricity, Gas, Telecommunications, Posts and Railway (BNetzA), Member of the Rail Infrastructure Advisory Council
- Greenpeace, Member
