= Michael Hennrich =

German politician

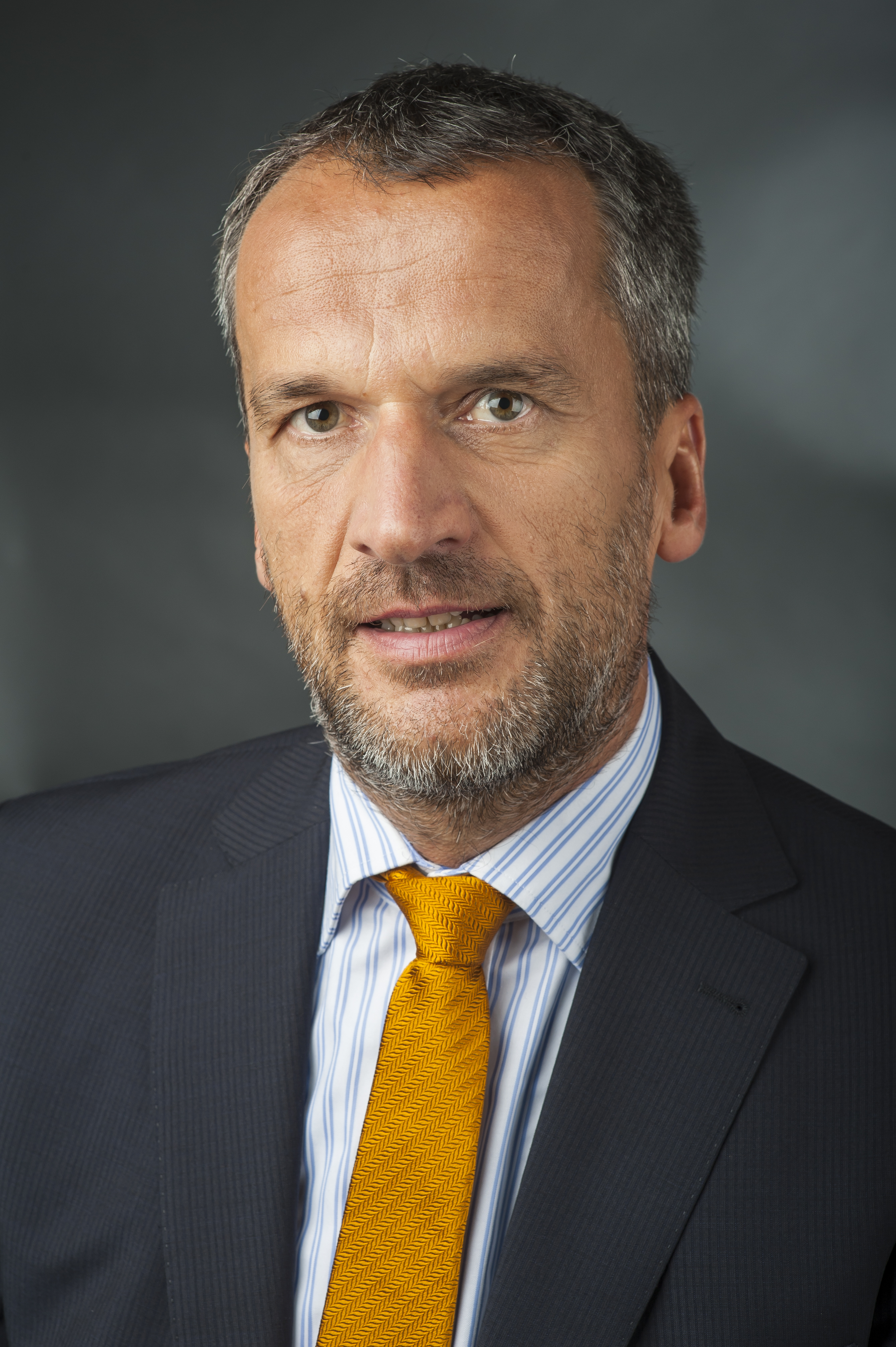
- Hennrich in 2014

Member of the Bundestag; for Nürtingen
- In office 17 October 2002 – 28 February 2023
- Preceded by: Elmar Müller
- Succeeded by: Alexander Föhr

Personal details
- Born: 14 January 1965 (age 61) Balingen, West Germany
- Party: Christian Democratic Union
- Education: University of Passau; University of Bonn

Michael Hennrich (born 14 January 1965) is a German lawyer and politician of the Christian Democratic Union (CDU) who served as a member of the Bundestag from the state of Baden-Württemberg from 2002 to 2023.

== Political career ==
Hennrich became a member of the Bundestag in the 2002 German federal election, always being directly elected in the Nürtingen constituency He was a member of the Health Committee, where he served as his parliamentary group's rapporteur on pharmaceutical supply.

In addition to his committee assignments, Hennrich was also part of the German Parliamentary Friendship Group for Relations with Arabic-Speaking States in the Middle East, which is in charge of maintaining inter-parliamentary relations with Bahrain, Irak, Yemen, Jordan, Qatar, Kuwait, Lebanon, Oman, Saudi Arabia, Syria, United Arab Emirates, Palestinian territories.

Hennrich became a member of the German delegation to the Parliamentary Assembly of the Council of Europe (PACE) since 2010. In the Assembly, he served on the Committee on Culture, Science, Education and Media (2014–2018; since 2022); the Sub-Committee on the Cultural Heritage (2010–2012); the Sub-Committee on Development Issues (2010–2012).

In July 2022, Hennrich announced that he would resign from active politics by early 2023 and instead become managing director of the German Medicines Manufacturers´ Association (BAH).

At the end of February 2023, Hennrich resigned his mandate to work as managing director of the Federal Association of Drug Manufacturers. Alexander Föhr succeeded him in the Bundestag.

== Other activities ==
- Süddeutsche Lebensversicherung, Member of the supervisory board (since 2016)
- Federal Network Agency for Electricity, Gas, Telecommunications, Post and Railway (BNetzA), Member of the advisory board (2003-2008)

== Political positions ==
In June 2017, Hennrich voted against Germany's introduction of same-sex marriage.

Ahead of the Christian Democrats’ leadership election, Hennrich publicly endorsed in 2020 Jens Spahn to succeed Annegret Kramp-Karrenbauer as the party's chair.
