= Anton Stark =

German lawyer and CDU politician

Member of the Bundestag
- In office 19 October 1965 – 20 December 1990
- Preceded by: Constituency established
- Succeeded by: Elmar Müller
- Constituency: Nürtingen – Böblingen (1965–1980); Nürtingen (1980–1990)

Personal details
- Born: 23 August 1929 Kirchheim am Ries, Germany
- Died: 10 February 2018 (aged 88)
- Party: Christian Democratic Union
- Children: 4

Anton Stark (23 August 1929 – 10 February 2018) was a German lawyer and CDU politician.

== Career ==
Stark studied philosophy, Catholic theology, economics and law in Tübingen, Baden-Württemberg and Bonn, North Rhine-Westphalia. Afterwards, he received a doctoral degree on the concept of the "social constitutional state" in 1959. Before he entered the Bundestag, he was a lawyer and an adviser for the Stuttgart farmers association.

He entered the Bundestag in 1965 and was elected for the first time on 19 September that year, increasing the CDU's first vote in the constituency to 50% from 39.7%.
