= David Preisendanz =

German politician (born 1984)

David Preisendanz MdB

Member of the Bundestag; for Esslingen
- Incumbent
- Assumed office 25 March 2025
- Preceded by: Markus Grübel

Personal details
- Born: 4 January 1984 (age 42) Böblingen, West Germany
- Party: Christian Democratic Union
- Education: University of Konstanz; University of Lausanne

David Sebastian Preisendanz (born 4 January 1984) is a German politician who was elected as a member of the Bundestag in 2025. He has served as chairman of the Christian Democratic Union in Ostfildern since 2023.
