= Wolfgang Frank =

German football player and manager (1951–2013)

Personal information
- Full name: Wolfgang Frank
- Date of birth: 21 February 1951
- Place of birth: Reichenbach an der Fils, West Germany
- Date of death: 7 September 2013 (aged 62)
- Place of death: Mainz, Germany
- Height: 1.72 m (5 ft 8 in)
- Position: Striker

Youth career
- TSV Schlierbach

Senior career*
Years	Team	Apps	(Gls)
–1971	VfL Kirchheim/Teck		
1971–1973	VfB Stuttgart	55	(23)
1973–1974	AZ Alkmaar	22	(4)
1974–1977	Eintracht Braunschweig	106	(52)
1977–1980	Borussia Dortmund	34	(10)
1980–1982	1. FC Nürnberg	20	(4)
1982–1984	FSV Bad Windsheim		
Total		215	(89)

International career
1972–1977	West Germany B	6	(3)

Managerial career
- 1984–1988: FC Glarus
- 1989–1990: FC Aarau
- 1991–1992: FC Wettingen
- 1992–1993: FC Winterthur
- 1994–1995: Rot-Weiss Essen
- 1995–1997: Mainz 05
- 1997–1998: Austria Wien
- 1998–2000: Mainz 05
- 2000: MSV Duisburg
- 2002–2004: SpVgg Unterhaching
- 2004–2005: FC Sachsen Leipzig
- 2006: Farul Constanța
- 2006–2007: Kickers Offenbach
- 2008: Wuppertaler SV Borussia
- 2008–2009: SV Wehen Wiesbaden
- 2010–2011: Carl Zeiss Jena
- 2011–2012: Eupen
- * Club domestic league appearances and goals

Wolfgang Frank (21 February 1951 – 7 September 2013) was a German football manager and player.

Frank was born in Reichenbach an der Fils, and made 215 appearances in the Bundesliga during his playing career, scoring 89 goals. For the Germany national football B team, he scored three goals in six games.

As a manager, Frank was at the helm of 16 clubs and led Rot-Weiss Essen to the 1994 DFB-Pokal final, only to lose 3–1 to SV Werder Bremen at Berlin's Olympic Stadium.

In his final year as a player, Frank trained as a teacher in sport and religion. He was inspired by Arrigo Sacchi's A.C.Milan and introduced the 4-4-2 system to Germany at a time when German teams played with a sweeper. Inspired by how Sacchi had got his team to press, marking space rather than individual players, Frank introduced this advanced tactical thinking into German football. He is credited with inspiring a renaissance in the Bundesliga which has inspired a new generation of managers such as Jürgen Klopp and Joachim Löw.

Frank died in Mainz, aged 62.
