= Matthias Hiller (politician) =

German politician (born 1985)

Matthias Hiller MdB
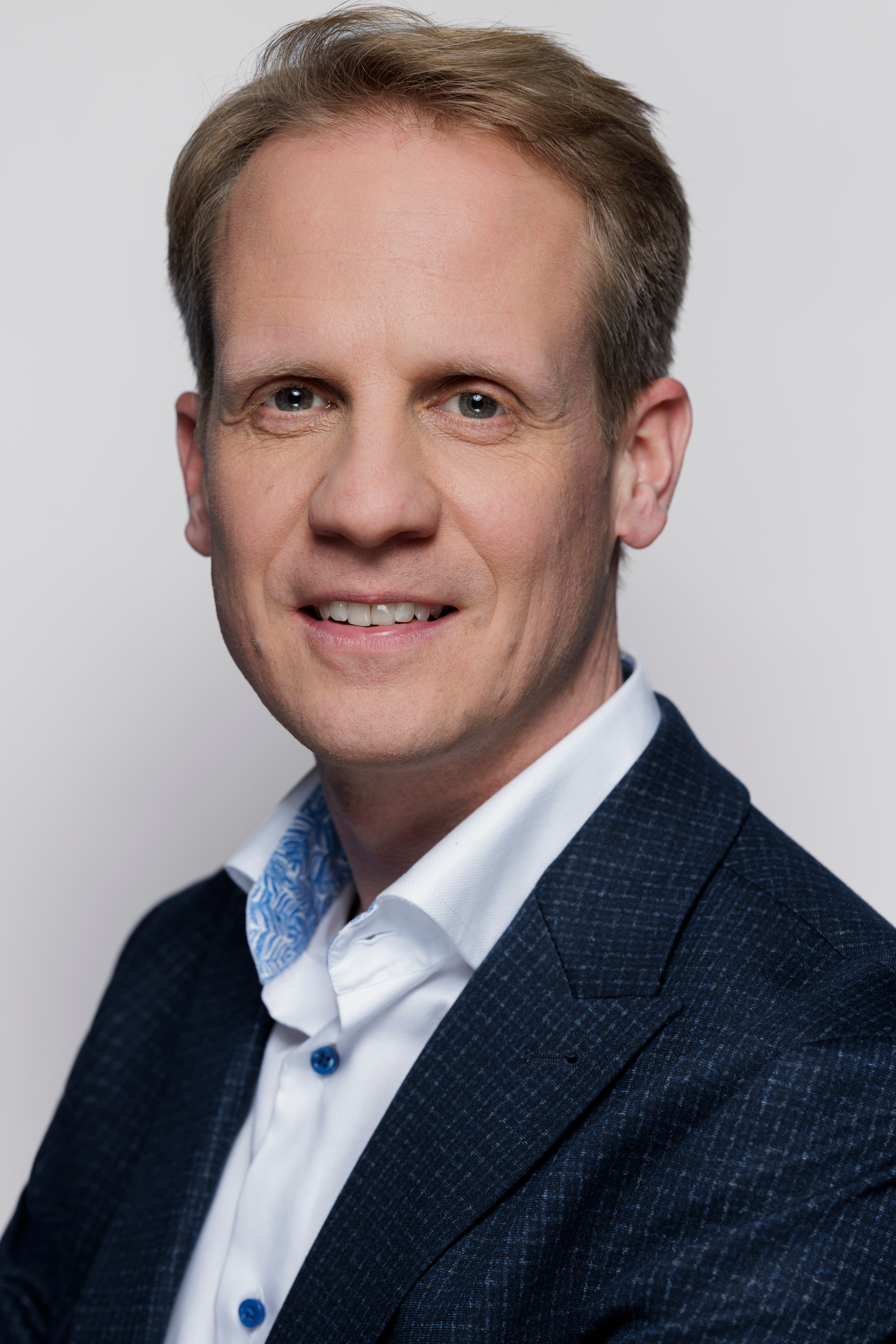

Member of the Bundestag; for Nürtingen
- Incumbent
- Assumed office 25 March 2025
- Preceded by: Alexander Föhr

Personal details
- Born: 8 January 1985 (age 41) Nürtingen, West Germany
- Party: Christian Democratic Union
- Education: University of Hohenheim; Aarhus BSS

Matthias Fabian Hiller (born 8 January 1985) is a German politician who was elected as a member of the Bundestag in 2025. He is the chairman of the Christian Democratic Union in Nürtingen.
