= Baltmannsweiler =

- Municipality
- Coat of arms

- Location of Baltmannsweiler within Esslingen district
- Interactive map of Baltmannsweiler
- Location within Germany Location within Baden-Württemberg
- Coordinates: 48°44′36″N 9°26′57″E
- Country: Germany
- State: Baden-Württemberg
- Admin. region: Stuttgart
- District: Esslingen
- Subdivisions: 2

Government
  - Mayor (2015–23): Simon Schmid

Area
  - Total: 18.54 km^{2} (7.16 sq mi)
- Elevation: 453 m (1,486 ft)

Population (2025-12-31)
  - Total: 5,588
  - Density: 301.4/km^{2} (780.6/sq mi)
- Time zone: UTC+01:00 (CET)
  - Summer (DST): UTC+02:00 (CEST)
- Postal codes: 73664–73666
- Dialling codes: 07153
- Vehicle registration: ES
- Website: www.baltmannsweiler.de

Baltmannsweiler is a municipality in the district of Esslingen in Baden-Württemberg. It belongs to the Region Stuttgart. (until 1992 Region Mittlerer Neckar) and the European Metropolitan Region Stuttgart.

== Geography ==
=== Geographical location ===
The densely wooded municipal area Baltmannsweiler lies at about 290 to 465 meters in virgin forest. The center of the name-giving suburb is about four and a half kilometers northeast of Plochingen as the crow flies and about ten kilometers east of the center of the district town Esslingen am Neckar. The two villages of the community are situated in a common clearing island on a mountain ridge, which is drained by the Reichenbach at the edge of the community and by the Lützelbach at its south-western edge to the Fils as well as in the west and north-west from the upper reaches of the Schweizerbach to the Rems.

=== Neighbouring communities ===
Adjoining communities are in turn the town Weinstadt in the northwest, the community Winterbach in the north and northeast, both in the Rems-Murr-Kreis. In the east is the community Lichtenwald, in the south the community Reichenbach an der Fils, in the southwest the town Plochingen, in the west on only a short section the county town Esslingen am Neckar and in the west the community Aichwald; the last five belong all to the own District Esslingen.

== Religion ==
At the end of 1998, the municipality had 1275 inhabitants who were Roman Catholic and 2998 inhabitants who were Protestant.

== History ==
=== Baltmannsweiler ===
Baltmannsweiler was first documented in 1299. The village originally belonged to the Zähringern and then came to Württemberg. There it was assigned to the Amt, later Oberamt Schorndorf from 1381 on. Since 1938 Baltmannsweiler belongs to the district of Esslingen. The autochthonen Inhabitants of the village today used name for the village is "Baltemore".

=== Development of population ===
Year	Population¹
1871	1310
1880	1335
1890	1191
1900	1171
1910	1184
1925	1230
1933	1274

Year	Population¹
1939	1333
1950	1963
1961	2688
1970	3944
1975	4599
1980	5143
1985	5206

Year	Population¹
1990	5307
1995	5425
2000	5520
2005	5552
2010	5554
2015	5646

¹Statistical Office of the State of Baden-Württemberg; until 1970 census results, from 1975 onwards updates on 31 December of each year.

== Economy and Infrastructure ==
=== Resident companies ===
The Hohengehren district is home to Schneider Verlag, a specialist book publisher.

=== Education ===
- Baltmannsweiler primary school with eight classes, in which about 160 pupils are taught
- Primary school Hohengehren with seven classes, in which about 130 children are taught

Baltmannsweiler also has four kindergartens.

- The municipality of Baltmannsweiler also runs its own adult education centre.

=== Waste disposal ===
The waste management company of the district of Esslingen is responsible for waste disposal.

== Culture and sights ==
Every year, the municipality of Baltmannsweiler organises five to eight cultural events such as cabaret and theatre, concerts and mobile cinema in the cultural centre Baltmannsweiler. The cultural centre has a foyer with a bar, where there is room for celebrations with up to 120 people. In addition there is a large hall for 300 to 500 people.

The hunting lodge Hohengehren stood in the former game park until 1839. This was acquired by the municipality Altbach, rebuilt there as town hall and used in this function until 1975.
