= Andreas Schwarz (politician, born 1979) =

German politician (born 1979)

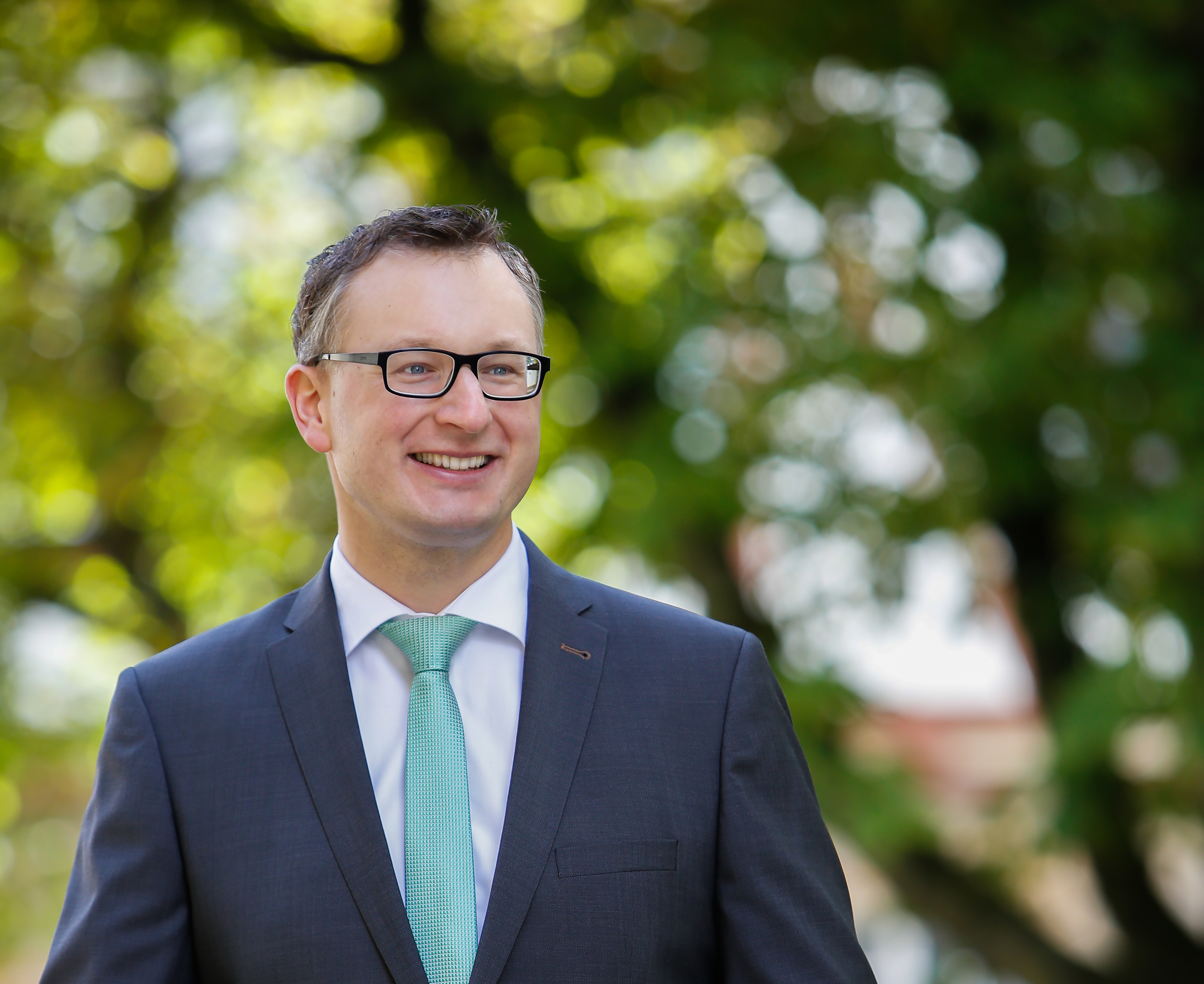
- Schwarz in 2017

Member of the Landtag of Baden-Württemberg
- Incumbent
- Assumed office 1 May 2011
- Constituency: Kirchheim (2016–present)

Personal details
- Born: 30 August 1979 (age 46)
- Party: Alliance 90/The Greens (since 1998)

Andreas Schwarz (born 30 August 1979) is a German politician of the Alliance 90/The Greens who has been serving as a member of the Landtag of Baden-Württemberg since 2011. He has served as his party's parliamentary group leader since 2016.

In the negotiations to form a coalition government under the leadership of Cem Özdemir following the 2026 state elections in Baden-Württemberg, Schwarz co-chaired the working group on transport, alongside Thomas Dörflinger.
