= Hochdorf, Esslingen =

Hochdorf
- Municipality
- Coat of arms

- Location of Hochdorf within Esslingen district
- Interactive map of Hochdorf
- Location within Germany Location within Baden-Württemberg
- Coordinates: 48°41′43″N 9°28′10″E
- Country: Germany
- State: Baden-Württemberg
- Admin. region: Stuttgart
- District: Esslingen

Government
  - Mayor (2017–25): Gerhard Kuttler

Area
  - Total: 7.75 km^{2} (2.99 sq mi)
- Elevation: 292 m (958 ft)

Population (2025-12-31)
  - Total: 4,699
  - Density: 606/km^{2} (1,570/sq mi)
- Time zone: UTC+01:00 (CET)
  - Summer (DST): UTC+02:00 (CEST)
- Postal codes: 73269
- Dialling codes: 07153
- Vehicle registration: ES
- Website: www.hochdorf.de

Hochdorf (German pronunciation: [ˈhoːxdɔʁf]) is a municipality in the district of Esslingen, Baden-Württemberg, in southern Germany. The mayors are Roland Erhardt (1986 – 31 March 2009) and Gerhart Kuttler (since 1 April 2009).

Hochdorf is situated about 30 km southeast of Stuttgart in the northwestern foothills of the Swabian Jura and just south of the Schurwald. The municipality extends between Plochingen (west) and Kirchheim unter Teck (south) in the valley of the Talbach, shortly before it converges with the Fils.

Hochdorf in Esslingen district

== Geography ==
=== Neighboring communities ===
Adjacent municipalities are Ebersbach (Göppingen district) in the east, Notzingen in the south, Wernau in the west, Plochingen in the northwest and Reichenbach an der Fils in the north (all Esslingen district).

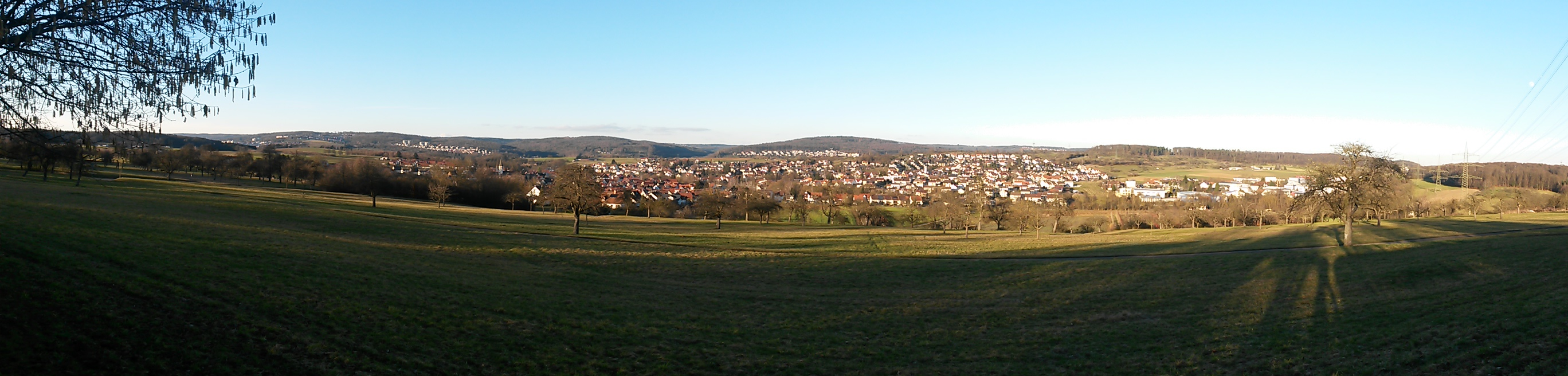
View from Hochdorf

=== Municipal Division ===
Hochdorf consists of the village of Hochdorf, the Ziegelhof house, and the deserted village of Hinterburg.

== History ==
Hochdorf was first mentioned in 1189 but probably originated in the 5th century. Until 1454, the place was owned by various monasteries, then it belonged to Württemberg. Within Württemberg, Hochdorf first belonged to Oberamt Kirchheim and, since 1485, to Oberamt Göppingen. In 1842, Kirchheim was reincorporated, where the city remained until the reorganization of the districts in 1938. Since then, Hochdorf has belonged to the district of Esslingen.

== Religions ==
Since the Reformation, Hochdorf is predominantly Protestant coined.

== Economy and Infrastructure ==
=== Education ===
Since the 1970s, there has been only one primary school in Hochdorf, the Breitwiesenschule. Secondary schools are attended in neighboring towns. Additionally, there are three kindergartens and a forest kindergarten in the municipality. The Kinderhaus am Talbach and the forest kindergarten "Die Waldmäuse" are operated by the Protestant Church. The "Albert-Schweitzer-Kinderhaus" is under the auspices of the Catholic Church. The Kinderhaus "Im Hof" is managed by the municipality of Hochdorf and exclusively offers full-day places. The children's and youth library has a collection of 4000 media.

=== Natural Monuments ===
In the territory of Hochdorf, there is one individual and eleven area natural monuments:

- Linden group (three winter linden trees)
- Kreuzeiche (fallen victim to the Lothar storm in 1999)
- An abandoned Angulaten sandstone quarry
- The Talbach with the mill canal
- Various field hedges and field trees

=== Regular Events ===
The community of Hochdorf regularly organizes various events, including:

- Martini Market
- Multi-day Music Association Festival
- Farmers' Market
- Cider Festival
- Festival of Lights
- Fire Department Festival
- Equestrian Tournament
- Maypole Installation
- Indoor Carnival & Twilight Parade
- Summer Camp
- Children's Bible Week

=== Natural monuments ===
- Linde Group (three Tilia cordata)
- Kreuzeiche (victim of the 1999 hurricane Lothar)
- the Talbach (valley stream) with the Mühlkanal (mill channel)

=== Regular events ===
- Martini market
- Music club festival (several days)
- Farmer's market
- Festival of lights
- Fire department festival
- Riding festival

== Freeman ==
- Heinrich Traub, former mayor

== Sons and daughters of the town ==
- Gottlieb Fischer (1867–1926), Member of Parliament

== Personalities who were active in Hochdorf ==
- Hans Blickensdörfer (1923–1997), sports journalist and writer, lived in Hochdorf
- Rüdiger Kauf (born 1975), professional football player for VfB Stuttgart and Arminia Bielefeld played in his youth with TV Hochdorf
- Siegmar Mosdorf, (born 1952), politician (SPD), Member of Parliament (1990–2002) and Parliamentary Secretary to the Federal Minister of Economics and Technology (1998–2002), co-founder and longtime head of the community foundation Hochdorf
- Susanne Weber-Mosdorf, (born 1953), politician (SPD), Deputy Director General of the World Health Organization (2006–2011), co-founder of the Community Foundation Hochdorf, lives in Hochdorf

== Literature ==
- Erich Roos: Dorf-Chronik Hochdorf 1900–1950. Geiger, Horb 2001, ISBN 3-89570-733-3.
- Gemeinde Hochdorf (Hrsg.), Christof Drüppel: Hochdorf – Geschichte einer Gemeinde im Albvorland. Jan Thorbecke Verlag, Sigmaringen 1989.
- Gemeinde Hochdorf (Hrsg.): Hochdorf in Bildern – Vorgestern, Gestern und Heute. Geiger, Horb 1982.
- Der Landkreis Esslingen (Band 2). Hrsg. vom Landesarchiv Baden-Württemberg i. V. mit dem Landkreis Esslingen, Jan Thorbecke Verlag, Ostfildern 2009, ISBN 978-3-7995-0842-1, Seite 17.
