= Reichenbach an der Fils =

- Municipality
- Coat of arms

- Location of Reichenbach an der Fils within Esslingen district
- Interactive map of Reichenbach an der Fils
- Location within Germany Location within Baden-Württemberg
- Coordinates: 48°42′36″N 9°27′58″E
- Country: Germany
- State: Baden-Württemberg
- Admin. region: Stuttgart
- District: Esslingen

Government
  - Mayor (2016–24): Bernhard Richter

Area
  - Total: 7.43 km^{2} (2.87 sq mi)
- Elevation: 276 m (906 ft)

Population (2025-12-31)
  - Total: 8,390
  - Density: 1,130/km^{2} (2,920/sq mi)
- Time zone: UTC+01:00 (CET)
  - Summer (DST): UTC+02:00 (CEST)
- Postal codes: 73258–73262
- Dialling codes: 07153
- Vehicle registration: ES
- Website: www.reichenbach-fils.de

Reichenbach an der Fils (German pronunciation: [ˈʁaɪçn̩bax ʔan deːɐ̯ ˈfɪls], lit. 'Reichenbach on the Fils') is a municipality in the Esslingen district in Baden-Württemberg in southern Germany.

== Geography ==
=== Geographical Location ===
The municipality of Reichenbach an der Fils is approximately 12 km (as the crow flies) east-southeast of the district town of Esslingen and about 25 km in the same direction from the state capital, Stuttgart. It is situated on the Fils River, which flows westward here, with the Reichenbach coming from the north, the Lützelbach from the northwest, and subsequently the Talbach from the southeast. The municipal area is predominantly located to the right of the river; its northern part belongs to the Schurwald subarea of the Schurwald and Welzheimer Wald natural region, while its smaller southern part along the river course belongs to the foothills of the central Swabian Alb. The lowest point at approximately 253 meters above sea level is at the outlet of the Fils, while the highest point, the Probst forested hill, reaches up to 446 meters above sea level in the northeast.

== Municipal Divisions ==
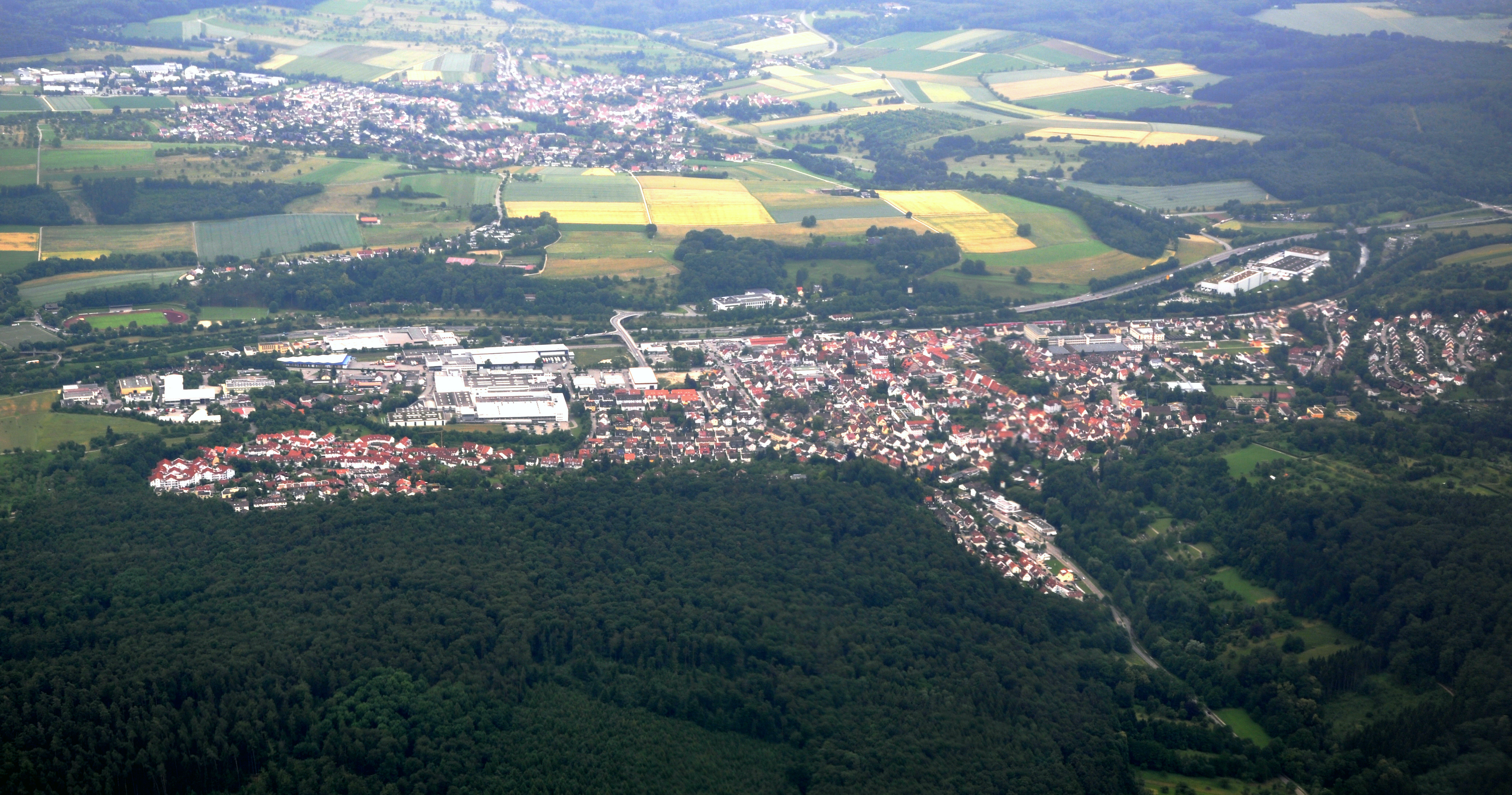
Aerial view of Reichenbach an der Fils, 2011

Apart from the village of Reichenbach, the municipality of Reichenbach an der Fils includes no other settlements. Within the municipality's area lie the vanished localities of Bornhausen or Bernhausen, Geroldsweiler or Gerensweiler, and Knollenhof.

=== Neighboring Municipalities ===
The municipality of Reichenbach an der Fils borders the following municipalities: the municipality of Hochdorf to the south, the town of Plochingen to the west, the municipalities of Baltmannsweiler to the northwest and Lichtenwald to the northeast, all of which are also in the district of Esslingen, as well as the town of Ebersbach an der Fils to the east in the district of Göppingen.

== History ==
=== From the Stone Age to the Middle Ages ===
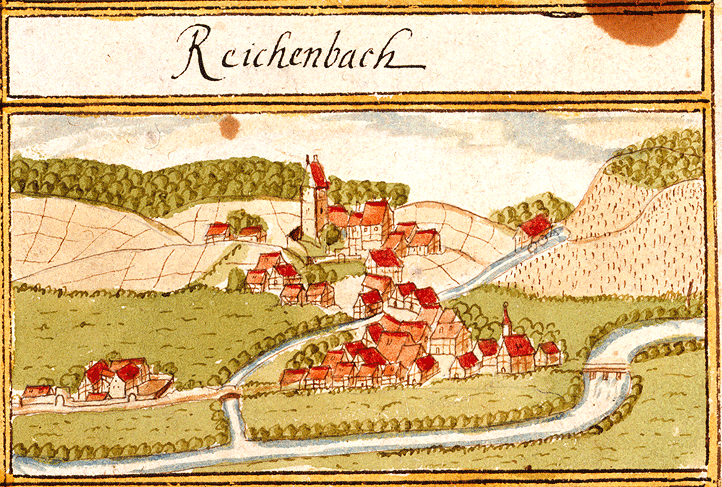
Reichenbach 1685, Forest Inventory Book by Andreas Kieser

Traces of people from the Middle Stone Age (12,000–5000 BC) have been found on the heights of the Fils Valley, as well as on the terrain north of the Siegenhof.

Reichenbach an der Fils was first mentioned in a document in the year 1268. However, like many places, the exact time of birth remains in the darkness of history. The founding period of the village can be deduced from field names and compared with neighboring villages, likely between the 9th and 11th centuries. Thus, Reichenbach was a village in the Duchy of Swabia. Wilhelm Böhringer and Gustav Wohlbold, both former educators at the local elementary school, have researched state and church archives in the past and found the place mentioned for the first time in connection with a dispute between two noblewomen as "Marquardus plebanus de Richenbach," recorded as a witness on a document from the year 1268.

The name of the village has nothing to do with wealth. Rather, it is named after the stream flowing through the municipality. To prevent confusion with municipalities of the same name, the designation "Reichenbach an der Fils" was introduced in 1906. At the end of the 13th century, Reichenbach came under the sovereignty of the Lords of Württemberg, after the Staufers and then the Dukes of Teck had previously held sway. In 1299, Duke Hermann of Teck relinquished all ownership and sovereignty claims in Reichenbach to Württemberg.

=== Development in the Early Modern Period ===
In 1534, the Protestant Duke Ulrich ordered that Württemberg, and therefore Reichenbach, should henceforth be Protestant according to the principle of "cuius regio, eius religio." Originally, Reichenbach belonged to the district in Kirchheim, from 1485 to the district in Göppingen. The community developed slowly. During the recurring periods of war from the 16th to the 19th centuries, when Spanish, Swedish, Austrian, and especially French troops marched through the Fils Valley for nearly 300 years, Reichenbach became a battlefield through occupations, plundering, and combat. Even Napoleon traveled through the village in 1806.

After once having 600 inhabitants, Reichenbach was almost depopulated after the Thirty Years' War and numbered only about 50 residents. It was one of the most devastated villages in the district of Göppingen. It took 180 years for the village to recover from this dire time. Only at the beginning of the 19th century did noticeable migrations occur. In the economic history of the early Duchy of Württemberg, Reichenbach had long functioned as a mining town. Already in the 15th century, the Württemberg counts and later dukes had copper and manganese ores mined at Asang and in the Lützelbachtal, from which colors were obtained. In 1457, a coal mine was established in the direction of Baltmannsweiler. Not only were there occasional small coal seams in the sandstone, but also traces of gold and silver. At times, more than six adits were in operation. In 1561, a smelter was built, but mining was discontinued in 1739 due to insufficient output.

=== After the Establishment of the Kingdom of Württemberg ===
In the implementation of the new administrative structure in the Kingdom of Württemberg, founded in 1806, Reichenbach remained assigned to the district of Göppingen. The upswing of Reichenbach coincides with industrialization. The opening of the Filstalbahn railway in 1847 was of great importance, as this made Reichenbach a railway station and provided access to the network of the Württemberg Railway and the regional transportation routes. The establishment of the Heinrich Otto cotton spinning and weaving mill in 1879 brought further growth.

=== Since the 20th Century ===
The administrative reform during the Nazi era in Württemberg in 1938 led to Reichenbach being assigned to the district of Esslingen. After World War II, Reichenbach belonged to the state of Württemberg-Baden in the American occupation zone. With the founding of Baden-Württemberg in 1952, Reichenbach became part of the present-day federal state.

=== Religions ===
Since Duke Ulrich introduced the Reformation in 1534, Reichenbach has been predominantly Protestant. The Protestant overall parish of Reichenbach belongs to the Esslingen district of the Evangelical Church in Württemberg. After World War II, a Roman Catholic community was established again. The Catholic Church of St. Michael was built in 1954 and provided with its own parish in 1959. Today, the parish belongs to the pastoral unit Neckar-Fils in the Esslingen-Nürtingen deanery of the Diocese of Rottenburg-Stuttgart. Additionally, there is a New Apostolic congregation in Reichenbach.

=== Population Development ===
Year	1653	1871	1900	1925	1950	1970	1980	1990	1995	2000	2005	2010	2015	2020
Population	150	970	1,481	2,349	4,517	8,111	7,261	7,361	7,424	8,022	8,029	7,936	8,236	8,378

Source: Statistisches Landesamt B-W.

== Politics ==
=== Municipal Council ===
The municipal council in Reichenbach consists of 18 members. It comprises elected honorary municipal councillors and the mayor as chairman. The mayor has voting rights in the municipal council. The local elections on 26 May 2019 resulted in the following outcome:

Parties and Voter Associations	% 2019	Seats; 2019	% 2014	Seats; 2014
SPD	22.02	4	26.92	5
FW	28.74	5	26.52	5
CDU	23.64	4	25.67	4
Greens	25.61	5	20.89	4
Total	100.0	18	100.0	18
Voter turnout	59.35 %		48.72 %	

=== Coat of Arms ===
Coat of Arms of Reichenbach an der Fils

Blazon: "Under a golden chief charged with a stag's attire, Gules a plowshare argent."

The earliest evidence for the old village coat of arms is a coat of arms stone from 1588 at the town hall in Reichenbach, which shows it alongside the shield of the then responsible administrative city of Göppingen. With the stag's attire as a symbol of Württemberg's territorial sovereignty in the chief, a plowshare is connected, which was a popular rural symbol and is documented on Reichenbach boundary stones in 1685 as a marker; undoubtedly, it is older than the depiction from 1588. The current coat of arms design is attested in newer municipal seals and has been in use with the now customary colors since 1930.

=== Flag ===
The municipal flag is red-yellow (1966).

=== Municipal Partnerships ===
There is a municipal partnership between the municipality of Reichenbach an der Fils and the French city of Sainte-Savine.

== Economy and Infrastructure ==
The municipality suffered greatly due to economic changes in the 1990s. At the beginning of the decade, the Otto company closed in Reichenbach. The Traub Drehmaschinen GmbH & Co. KG (after whose founder the Hermann-Traub-Stadium of VfB Reichenbach is named) has been a subsidiary of the Esslingen INDEX-Werke since 1997, which at that time led to massive job cuts. Other companies include the corrugated board manufacturer Seyfert GmbH, the transport and logistics company Kraftverkehr Nagel Kurt Nagel GmbH & Co., the electrical appliance manufacturer Electrostar, the plastics processor Oskar Voltz GmbH, as well as other medium-sized and small companies.

=== Transport ===
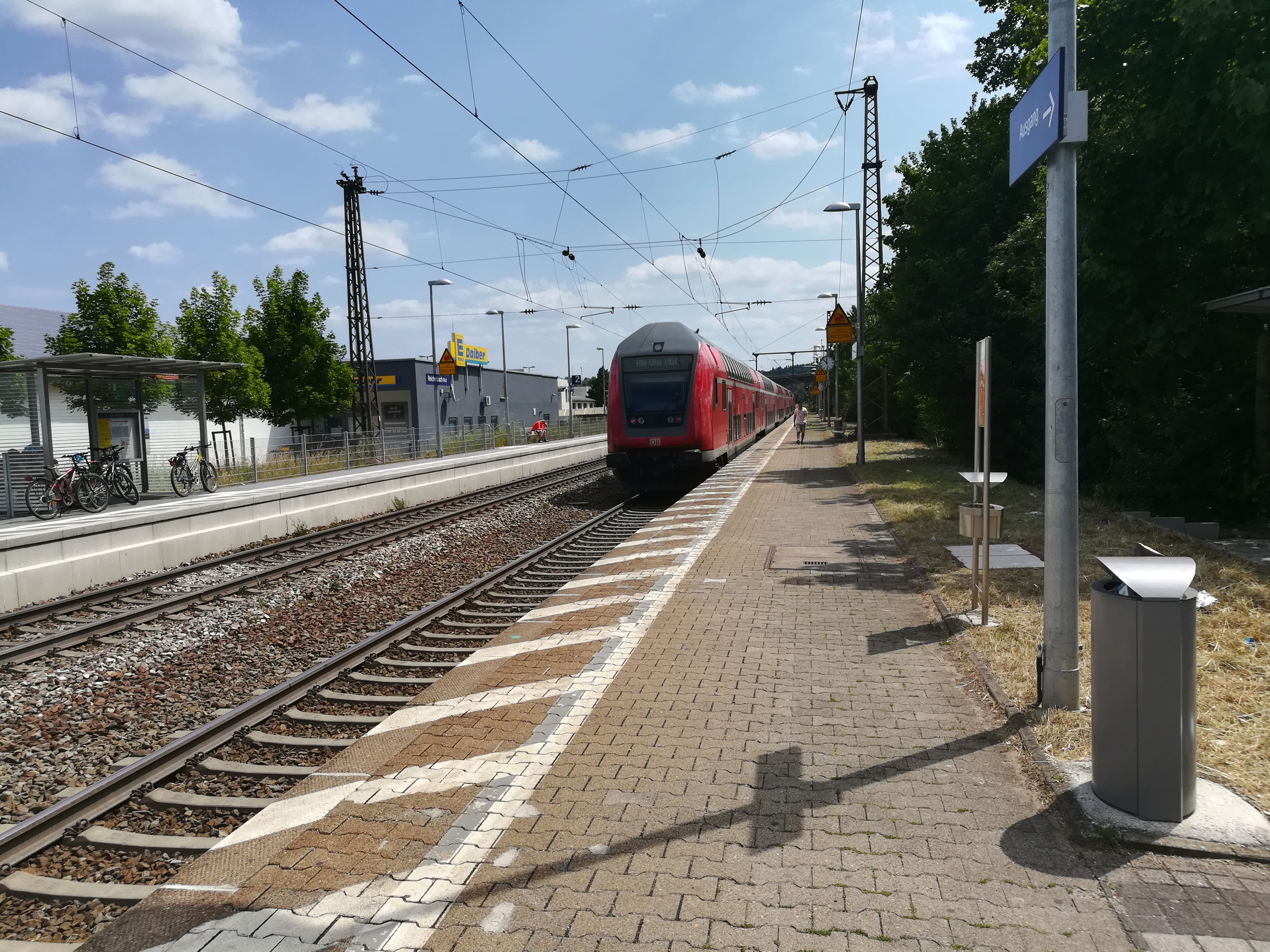
The train stop in 2017

The four-lane Bundesstrasse 10, a heavily traveled road in southern Germany, runs through Reichenbach. There are also cross-connections via Baltmannsweiler or Lichtenwald into the Rems Valley, as well as the road via Hochdorf and Notzingen to Kirchheim unter Teck. Stuttgart can be reached by car via the B 10 in about 25 minutes, and Stuttgart Airport is also about a 25 minute drive. Since 1847, the railroad has been running through Reichenbach. It is the heavily traveled Fils Valley Railway from Stuttgart to Ulm, on which the ICE and TGV also run. The Reichenbach train station building was renovated in the fall of 2006. Today, there is a restaurant in the building, and it is also a residential building. The stop is served every half hour by metropolitan express trains between 5 a.m. and 1 a.m. There are also bus connections towards Lichtenwald and Schorndorf, towards Hochdorf and Kirchheim unter Teck, as well as to Plochingen. The local bus serves the districts of Risshalde and Siegenberg. A significant traffic structure is the Sainte-Savine Bridge, named after Reichenbach's partner municipality Sainte Savine in France. It opens up the Voralb area and provides connections to the outdoor pool and the stadium. Shortly after the railway underpass comes the Fils Bridge, which was built in 1877. Until 2007, there was also a small shunting area with a rail connection to the aforementioned corrugated board factory. However, the rail facilities were completely removed during the 2007 renovation work. Since there is no longer an operational switch at the Reichenbach station due to the decommissioned rail connection, the station was downgraded to a stop in the fall of 2009. There is also the Otto Munz footbridge for pedestrians and cyclists. It spans the railway tracks, Filsstrasse, the B 10 expressway, and the Fils River, facilitating access to the outdoor pool and stadium. The neighboring municipalities of Plochingen and Ebersbach can be reached by train, while the other municipalities can be reached by bus.

=== Educational Institutions ===
In addition to a secondary school (Realschule), Reichenbach also has the Lützelbachschule, which is a primary and secondary modern school (Grund- und Hauptschule). The Brunnenschule, which was a pure primary school, was dissolved. The branch of the Marquardschule Plochingen, a special education school, rounds out the educational offerings. A school in Reichenbach was first mentioned in 1580. However, in the 16th and 17th centuries, children attended school only during the winter. A summer school met with resistance from the population because the children had to do fieldwork, even though compulsory education had existed since 1649. An energetic teacher is said to have achieved at least having classes on Tuesdays and Fridays during the summer. It was not until 1735 that schooling became year-round. The first school building was a structure built in 1738 on Kirchstraße, which no longer exists today. In 1825, the community built a new school building on Schulstraße, and in 1897, the eastern half of the Brunnenschule was constructed. The western section of the former elementary school (Volksschule) was built in 1912. In 1953, the first buildings of the Lützelbachschule were constructed in Brühl, which was a major financial challenge for the community. A gymnasium and sports field were added five years later. The building for the secondary school (Realschule) was built in 1976. Students from the secondary modern school (Hauptschule) and secondary school from Hochdorf and Lichtenwald are also taught at this educational center. The local library, with more than 22,000 books as well as cassettes, DVDs, and videos, is also housed in the secondary school building.

The first kindergarten was established in 1844 on Kirchstraße but probably did not open year-round until the end of the 19th century. However, only children who were still too young for fieldwork were brought to the "Kenderschüle." Today, there are eight kindergartens in Reichenbach: Robert-Schöttle-Kindergarten, Oskar-Voltz-Kindergarten, Siegenberg-Kindergarten, Michaelis-Kindergarten, Steinäcker-Kindergarten, Clärchen-Seyfert-Kindergarten, a forest kindergarten, and the Mini-Kindi in the town hall.

=== Sports ===
The soccer department of VfB Reichenbach currently plays in the Kreisliga A, while the now-dissolved chess department was one of the most successful in the district. The largest sports club in the town is TV Reichenbach with the following departments: competitive gymnastics, general gymnastics, children's sports, health sports, athletics, handball, table tennis, volleyball, fistball, and "Ballermänner" (a traditional game). The lifeguards of the local DLRG group Reichenbach/Fils are also extremely successful nationwide, both in the youth (especially the female swimmers) and senior categories, and hold several German championships in lifesaving.

There is also the RSV Reichenbach with the sports of mountain biking, recreational sports, and radball (a form of cycling polo).

The Reichenbacher Schützengilde e.V. practices shooting sports according to the rules of the German Shooting Sport Federation in the Lützelbachtal valley. In the indoor shooting ranges, rifle and pistol shooting take place at 10m, 25m and 50m in all DSB disciplines.

== Culture and Sights ==
Since 1983, the cultural initiative die halle in the former beer cellar has regularly offered concerts, cabaret, readings and parties.

== Churches ==
=== Evangelical Mauritius Church ===
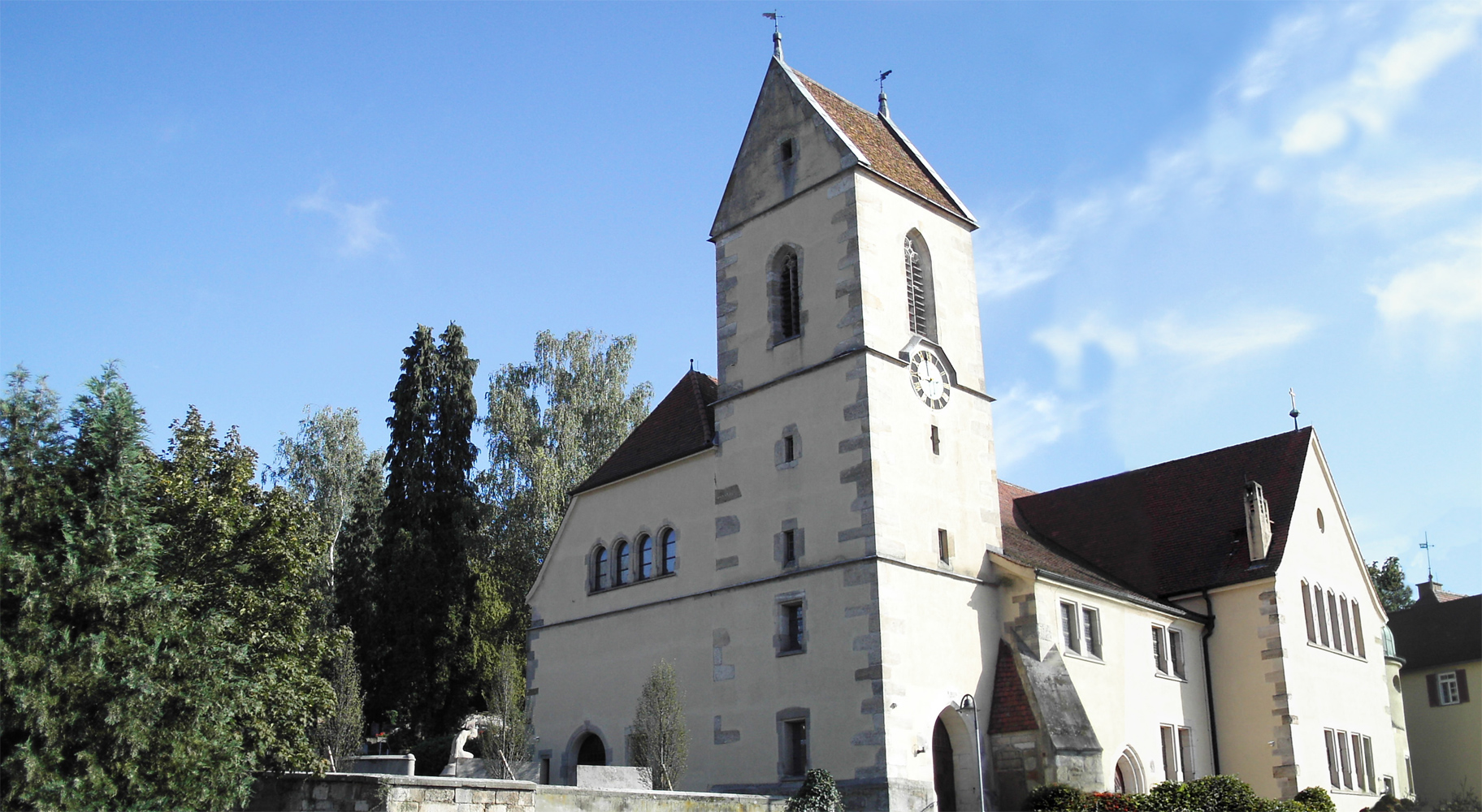
Evangelical Mauritius Church

The tower of the Mauritius Church dates from 1522. The sandstone for its construction was quarried in the Lützelbach valley. Since the church interior had become too small, the church was expanded in the Art Nouveau style from 1905 to 1907 according to designs by the Stuttgart architects Richard Böklen and Carl Feil. Today it has almost 1,000 seats. In 1982, the organ with its Art Nouveau facade was expensively renovated. In 1997, the church interior underwent a thorough renovation; at the same time, the somewhat unsuccessful changes of the 1954 renovation were removed and the church was restored to its original state. Today, the Mauritius Church is one of the few Art Nouveau churches in southwestern Germany. The Mauritius Church with the rectory, the church forecourt with fountain and the cemetery behind it form an ensemble that is under monument protection.

=== Catholic Church of St. Michael ===
Until the Reformation, Reichenbach was Catholic, but when Duke Ulrich joined the Reformation in 1534, his subjects also became Protestant. It was not until the beginning of the 20th century that Reichenbach again had a significant number of Catholics, and by around 1950 - also due to the influx of expellees and refugees from the World War II - a third of the inhabitants were Catholic. In 1953, construction of the Catholic church began. On 4 December 1954, Bishop Carl Joseph Leiprecht consecrated the church to the Holy Archangel Michael. It was renovated in 1988. Today the church has space for about 550 visitors. In addition, since 1962 five bells have been ringing, which could be bought through donations.

=== Evangelical Siegenberg Church ===
In May 1961, the wandering church was built as a wooden barrack. This provisional solution became necessary because the Siegenberg settlement was growing rapidly and already had 2,000 inhabitants. A few years later, a church building association collected donations, bought a building plot, started construction work and consecrated the church on Harvest Thanksgiving Day 1965. The church, furnished with a lot of natural wood, houses a church room with 150 seats under its roof, a parish hall separated from the church room by a folding wall, and two youth rooms.

=== New Apostolic Church ===
This Christian faith group had ten members in Reichenbach in 1921, and a year later held its first service. Until 1934, they had a room on Stuttgarter Strasse and then moved to Baltmannsweiler Strasse. When there were 60 members, it also became too cramped there, and the decision was made to build a church. This was consecrated on 27 October 1956. The property on Paulinenstrasse was renovated in 1988 and 1989. Meanwhile, the congregation has 120 members.

== Buildings ==
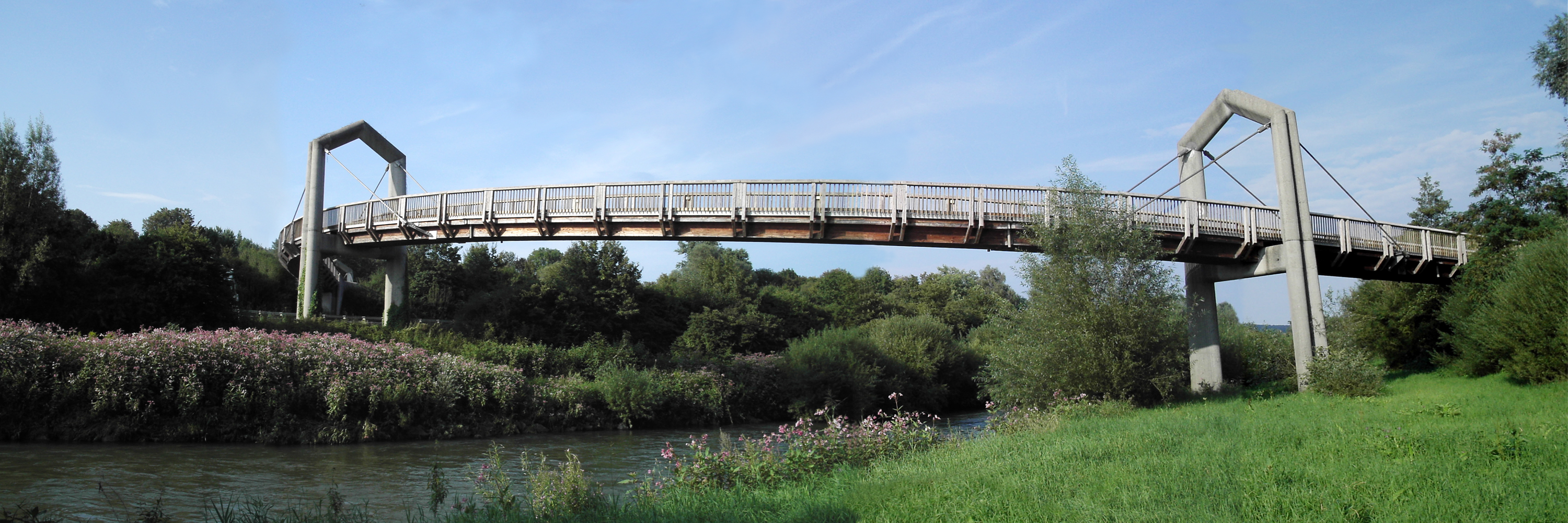
Otto Munz Footbridge over the Fils River

=== Town Halls ===
It is not known when the first town hall in Reichenbach was built, although it was probably around 1590. Its location was near the Fils River, which then still had its old course and followed today's Seestrasse (the riverbed was moved 800 meters to the south in 1696). There are reports from 1739 that the town hall was in a miserable condition and could only be entered at risk of life. But it took eight years before a new building could be decided upon. In 1751, a new town hall was completed, which was again too small and in need of repair by 1823; it was thoroughly renovated and expanded.

Although the building had again been much too small since 1900, people made do with finishing the attic. In 1959, the municipal council decided on a new building, construction of which began on 4 September 1961. The new building was inaugurated on 29 May 1964. The old town hall was demolished, as the Südwestbank wanted to build on this site. The bells of the old town hall can be found again in the entrance area of the new building; the tower clock now strikes in the Brunnenschule.

=== Cinemas ===
In the mid-20th century, the community had three cinemas. The "Central-Lichtspiele" opened in 1953. Also in 1953, the "Neue Filmtheater" opened on Wilhelmstrasse. In addition to the two permanent cinemas, there was a traveling cinema that was a guest on weekends in the hall of the gymnastics club. The last cinema closed its doors on Wilhelmstrasse in 1968.

=== Spots halls ===
The hall built by the gymnastics club in 1907 next to the railway lines served as a gymnasium and event hall for almost 70 years due to the lack of a larger event space. When Federal Highway 10 was built, the building was demolished. The new Brühlhalle was inaugurated on 15 May 1982. The construction costs amounted to about 10 million German marks.

=== Outdoor Pool ===
The outdoor pool opened on 29 May 1976. On this occasion, the then Parliamentary State Secretary at the Federal Minister for Research and Technology and later Federal Transport Minister Volker Hauff presented a check, and Mayor Richard Seeger jumped into the water from the diving tower in a tailcoat and top hat. Over 5 million bathers passed through the turnstiles in 25 years. As early as 1951, there was an outdoor pool located near the Fils defense system and the factory canal of the Otto Spinning Mill. This island pool was closed due to the construction of Federal Highway 10.

=== Russian Cemetery ===
During the World War II, there was a camp for Russian forced laborers near the Reichenbach train station. According to various sources, between 600 and 1,900 people lived there who had to work in the workshops of the German Reichsbahn. Eleven of the forced laborers who died during their captivity were buried in the municipal cemetery, and another 28, including 15 infants, in their own cemetery on the edge of the community.

== Famous people ==
- Diem Brown (1982–2014) possibly born in Reichenbach an der Fils, as this Reichenbach is the largest one with this name in the former West Germany and very few Americans would live in East Germany in the 1980s as it was communist country. http://www.tmz.com/person/diem-brown/
- Karl Brönnle (1879–1952), Reichsbahnrat, Member of Landtag (KPD)
- Wolfgang Frank (1951–2013), football player and -trainer
- Sabine Fohler (born 1963), politician (SPD), former Member of Landtag

== Sites of interest ==
- Brunnengasse
- Mauritiuskirche
