= Lichtenwald =

- Municipality
- Coat of arms

- Location of Lichtenwald within Esslingen district
- Interactive map of Lichtenwald
- Location within Germany Location within Baden-Württemberg
- Coordinates: 48°45′8″N 9°28′58″E
- Country: Germany
- State: Baden-Württemberg
- Admin. region: Stuttgart
- District: Esslingen

Government
  - Mayor (2019–27): Ferdinand Rentschler

Area
  - Total: 10.8 km^{2} (4.2 sq mi)
- Elevation: 467 m (1,532 ft)

Population (2025-12-31)
  - Total: 2,547
  - Density: 236/km^{2} (611/sq mi)
- Time zone: UTC+01:00 (CET)
  - Summer (DST): UTC+02:00 (CEST)
- Postal codes: 73669
- Dialling codes: 07153
- Vehicle registration: ES
- Website: www.lichtenwald.de

Lichtenwald (German pronunciation: [ˈlɪçtn̩valt]) is a municipality located in the Schurwald forest in the district of Esslingen in Baden-Württemberg in southern Germany. Situated on the state road L1151 between Reichenbach an der Fils (4 km) and Schorndorf (7 km). It belongs to the Stuttgart Region (until 1992 the Central Neckar Region) and the European metropolitan region of Stuttgart.

== Geography ==
=== Geographic Location ===
The district of Hegenlohe lies on the wooded eastern slope (also called Heuberg by locals) of the Reichenbach valley and, like Thomashardt situated on the high ridge, is surrounded by the mixed forests of the Schurwald. The municipal area ranges from 342 to 480 meters in elevation.

On the high trail (a hiking path from the community center to the nature house), one has a panoramic view of the Swabian Alb and areas in front of it on a clear day. There is a view of about 50 km to the southwest, and about 30 km to the east.

=== Municipal Division ===
Lichtenwald consists of the two districts of Hegenlohe and Thomashardt, which emerged from the two formerly independent municipalities of the same names from which the municipality of Lichtenwald was formed. The Hegenlohe district includes the village of Hegenlohe and the residential areas of Bannmühle and Ölmühle as well as the deserted village of Ritzenweiler. The Thomashardt district includes the village of Thomashardt. Approximately 66% of the municipal area consists of forest.

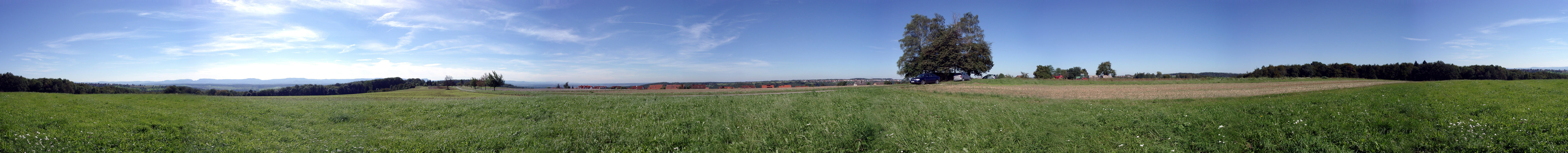
360° panorama at the Hegenlohe water reservoir, Höhenweg

=== Neighboring Municipalities ===
To the west, Thomashardt borders the also elevated municipality of Baltmannsweiler with its districts of Baltmannsweiler and Hohengehren on the Schurwald heights. To the south is the neighboring valley town of Reichenbach an der Fils. Again on the Schurwald heights lie the eastern neighboring towns of Büchenbronn (part of Ebersbach an der Fils) and Baiereck (part of Uhingen), as well as the northern neighboring towns of Schlichten (part of Schorndorf), and the northwestern villages of Manolzweiler and Engelberg (both part of Winterbach).

=== Climate ===
The climate in Lichtenwald is somewhat harsher than in the Fils valley. During the day, there can be a temperature difference of 1-3 degrees Celsius compared to the valley. This decreases in the evening, and in summer a reversal of the effect can be observed, as the warm air rises from the valley after sunset. In general, it is windier in Lichtenwald than in the valley, as the town is located on a mountain ridge. In winter, snow lies more often and for longer periods, as on the entire Schurwald, compared to the Fils, Neckar or Rems valleys. Due to the elevated location and (almost) unobstructed views to the west and east, Lichtenwald can take nearly full advantage of potential sunshine duration.

=== Geology ===
The geological structure of Lichtenwald follows the pattern also found in most of the remaining Schurwald region.

The Lichtenwald ridge consists of a very narrow zone (20–25 meters) of Black Jurassic or (lower) Lias alpha. This in turn is composed of a layer of weathered products such as dark loam, clay and sand, with the light gray Angulatensandstone underneath and even deeper (but no longer visible, as hidden under scree) the Psilonotenton. The Lias soils are, apart from their stony edges, good arable soils.

The further layers belong to the Keuper. Below the Lias alpha layer begins a 2–3 meters thick layer of Rhaetian (dark clayey-marly, but difficult to recognize). The clayey Knollenmergel joins as a 20–30 meters thick layer next to the Rhaetian and can be immediately identified as a 50–300 meters wide, undulating meadowland between the fields above and the forest edge below.

The Knollenmergel does not provide a good foundation and tends to swell when wet, which can lead to landslides. Typical consequences of ground movements are the many trees growing at an angle or with a kink in the lower part of the trunk towards the light, which is also referred to as crutch growth or saber growth.

The lowest layer of the Schurwald consists of Stubensandstein (Middle Keuper) with a layer thickness of 90–100 meters. This formation consists largely of sandstone banks into which numerous streams have cut.

=== Tectonics ===
The geological layers in the Schurwald generally dip from the northwest to the southeast by about 0.5-1°. Furthermore, today's Fils valley in the Reichenbach-Plochingen area represents a fault zone. Due to the sinking of the zone, in Reichenbach, Stubensandstein layers lie 50–70 meters lower than north of the fault line. The tensions have not yet subsided, which explains the tectonic earthquake of August 1940, whose epicenter was about 10 km below Hegenlohe (although it did not cause any damage, it was still felt throughout the Schurwald).

== History ==
=== Lichtenwald from 1971 ===
The municipality of Lichtenwald was formed on 1 January 1971 through the voluntary merger of the previously independent municipalities of Hegenlohe and Thomashardt. In a citizen's vote on 13 December 1970, more than 90% of voters, with a high turnout, voted in favor of the merger.

The name Lichtenwald is derived from "lichten Wald" (light forest), a term that appeared as early as 1555 in old forestry ledger books of the Schorndorf forestry office in reference to the municipalities of Hegenlohe and Thomashardt. The components of the town names, Lohe and Hardt, also trace back to the concepts of pasture forest and light forest. The inspiring idea for the name ultimately came from long-established citizen Karl Roos from Thomashardt. Other rejected suggestions included: Hegenhardt, Thomaslohe, Schlichtenwald, Hohenlau, Schurdorf, Langgehren and Langrain.

Since the 1990s, several public construction projects have taken place in Lichtenwald. After the town hall and village square in Thomashardt were initially redesigned, the water tower in Thomashardt was artistically designed in 1996, for which over 55,000 German marks were raised through donations from individuals, benefit events and sponsors from the business community. In 1998, the youth center near the elementary school was inaugurated, followed by the completion of the community center in October 2000, which houses the volunteer fire department, the municipal works yard and a community hall for clubs and cultural events. A new sports field was built in 2003. In 2012, a new multipurpose hall (community and sports hall) was added. The old sports and community hall was demolished in 2012 as it was in dire need of renovation, far too small, and no longer met today's requirements for such a building.

Population development:

Year	Inhabitants
1990	2,570
2001	2,561
2011	2,424
2021	2,676

=== Hegenlohe ===
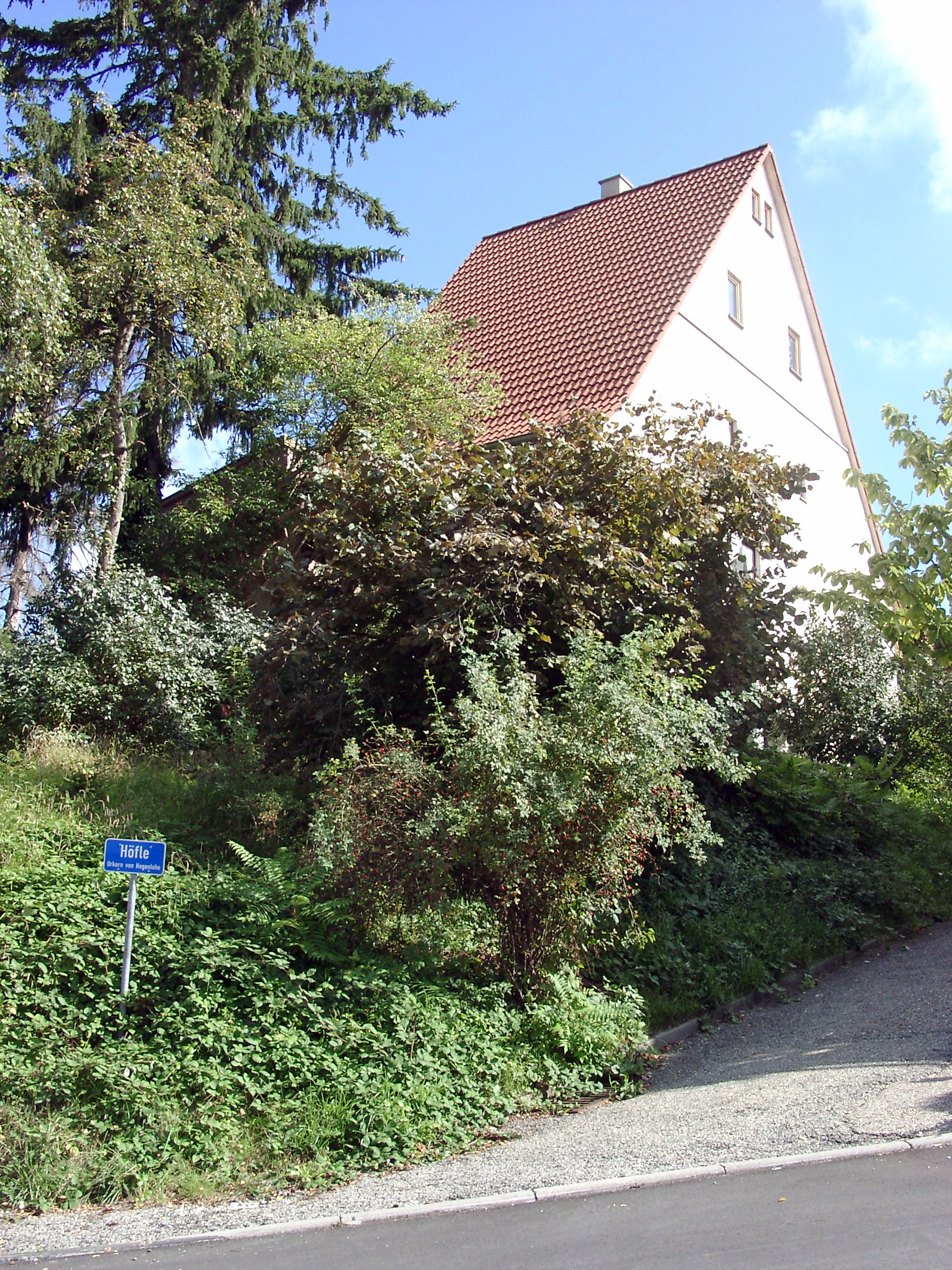
The Höfle, original core of Hegenlohe

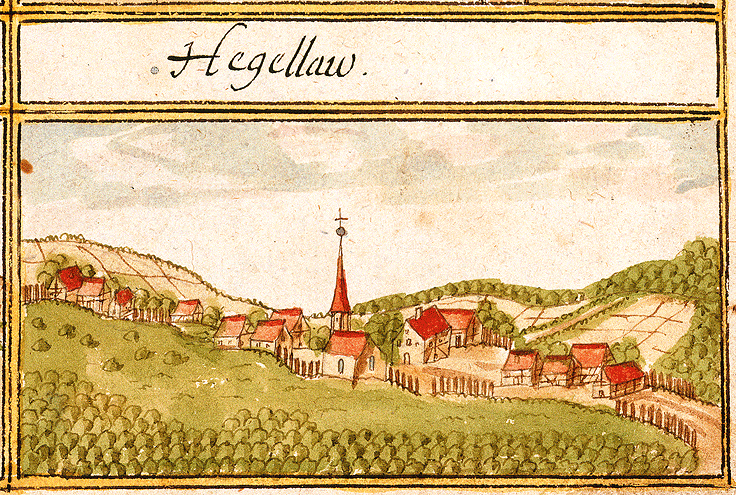
Hegenlohe 1685, forestry ledger book by Andreas Kieser

The first documented mention of Hegenlohe was on 26 April 1173, under the name Haginilo, when the Antipope Callixtus III confirmed the properties of the St. Blasien Monastery (Southern Black Forest) in Hegenlohe. Until 1364, the Dukes of Teck held the feudal lordship. Later, the feudal lordship over Hegenlohe was transferred to the Counts of Württemberg, who in turn enfeoffed it to the Esslinger family Holdermann among others. In 1457, the lordship reverted to the Württembergs, who then assigned the town to the district office of Schorndorf. The municipality has belonged to the Esslingen district since the regional reform of 1938. Until 1379, the settlement of Ritzisweiler, mentioned around 1140, existed on Hegenlohe's municipal area. Another settlement called Witzenweiler existed until before the Thirty Years' War.

Thomashardt and Hegenlohe always formed a unified parish community. Around 1700, the municipality of Hegenlohe began introducing its own school instruction; previously, school-age children (only boys) had to attend classes in Thomashardt and Hohengehren.

=== Holy Cross Church ===
An ecclesia (rather a chapel) was first documented in 1173. The present sacristy was built after 1200, with the ribbed groin vaulting inserted much later. The Protestant parish church of the Holy Cross, which sits on a rocky hilltop spur, was likely completed in 1479, although the interior underwent several changes over the centuries, most recently in 1955. The stone altar table probably dates back to the first chapel, while on the north wall there is a Gothic baptismal niche and in the flat-ceilinged nave, again on the north wall, a late Gothic sacrament niche from 1479. The wooden altar crucifix was carved around 1520 by an unknown hand and restored in 1955. An organ was likely already present around 1700, while the current one dates from 1835.

The church tower is 29 meters high, resting on both sides on a strong, freestanding medieval oak construction, with the upper two floors and tower roof completely rebuilt in 1809. The first large church bell from 1501, cast by the Esslingen bell founder Sydler and weighing almost 300 kg, had to be recast in 1949 due to a crack. Previously it was confiscated during World War II and transported to Esslingen, but returned in 1947. A small bell was last recast in 1832, melted down in 1917 during World War I and replaced by a new one in 1922. A third bell, the baptismal bell, was acquired in 1949. The bells ring in E-G-A (large bell - small bell - baptismal bell).

=== Thomashardt ===
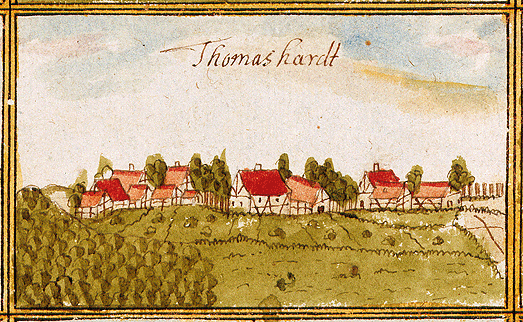
Thomashardt 1685

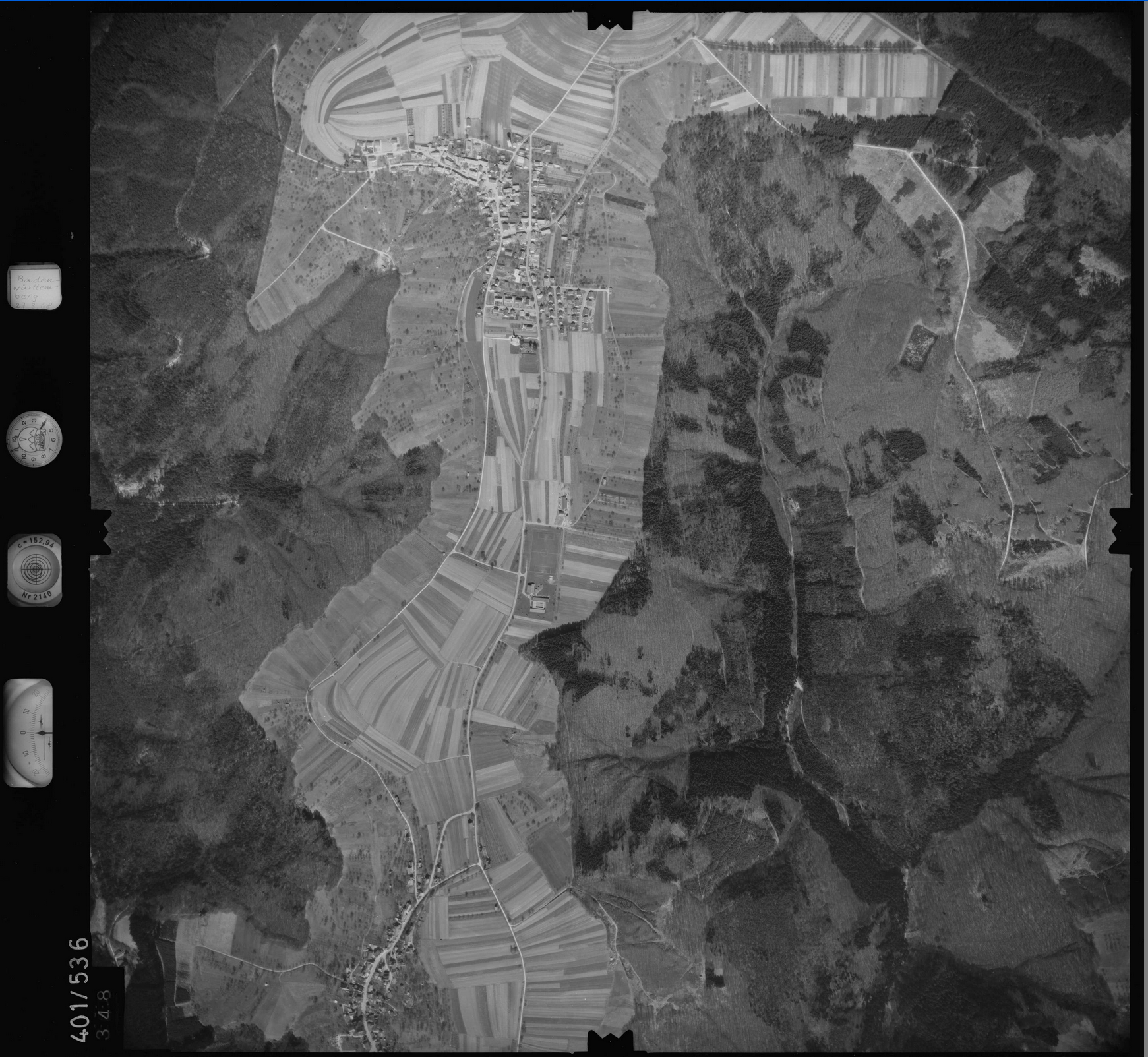
Thomashardt and parts of Hegenlohe 1968

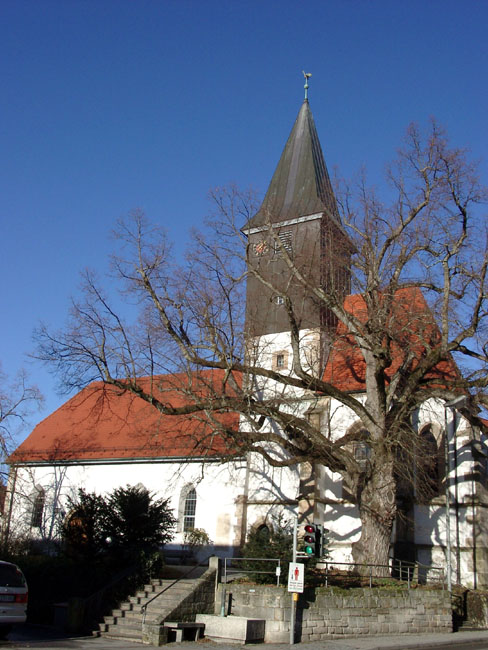
Hegenlohe's Holy Cross Church with village linden tree

Thomashardt first is first documented on 18 November 1324 under the name Dagemanshart. Until 1333, part of the town was owned by the Counts of Aichelberg, while another part was owned by the Dukes of Teck until 1367. Later, the Counts of Württemberg held the respective rights. The third part of the village belonged to Adelberg Monastery from 1268 onwards, which transferred its feudal rights to Württemberg in 1362. The monastery itself exercised its territorial lordship until 1535. Since 1453, the municipality belonged to the Schorndorf district office (or Oberamt Schorndorf from 1758 to 1934, then Kreis Schorndorf from 1934 to 1938), and since 1938 to the Esslingen district.

Until 1966, Thomashardt had neither a parish nor a church building. The Resurrection Church was built in 1965/66. The educational sector developed earlier than in Hegenlohe, with a school building constructed in 1812 that was also used as a town hall.

=== Shared History Before 1971 ===
Even before 1971, there were many commonalities between Thomashardt and Hegenlohe. Between 1560 and 1819, both municipalities belonged to the Schlichten Forest Court, and in 1819 they even formed a united municipality with Schlichten and Baiereck, based in Thomashardt. After Baiereck and Schlichten left the association, the two remaining municipalities separated on 29 September 1825, regaining their independence. Historically, the towns were part of old Württemberg for centuries, then part of the Kingdom of Württemberg from 1806 to 1918, and afterwards part of the Free People's State of Württemberg. In 1945, the towns fell into the American occupation zone and thus became part of the newly founded state of Württemberg-Baden, which merged into the present state of Baden-Württemberg in 1952. Even before reuniting in 1971, Thomashardt and Hegenlohe joined in a school association. In 1962, a school building was constructed on the municipal border, which today houses the elementary school.

=== Lichtenwald from 1971 ===
The population grew from 1,351 in 1971 to 2,572 residents in 2004, with 1,360 people in the Hegenlohe district and 1,212 in the Thomashardt district. As of March 31, 2015, according to the official population statistics of the municipal administration, 2,559 people lived in Lichtenwald (Hegenlohe: 1,424 residents, Thomashardt: 1,132 residents). As a result of the strong population growth, new residential areas had to be created and many new streets with supply and disposal lines built. In 1999/2000, the mixed-use and (limited) commercial area Ummerles Häule III was developed in Hegenlohe. In 2004/2005, the Hohenrain/Gassenäcker residential area in Hegenlohe was developed. In the fall of 2013, the development of the Thomashardt-Ost construction area in the district of the same name was completed with a roundabout at the northern entrance to the town, comprising separate residential and commercial areas.

=== Hegenlohe ===
From the 17th to the 19th century, the town developed very slowly. Reasons for this include the geographic location as well as devastating wars. The population grew from 40 residents after the Thirty Years' War to about 80 in 1702. In the 19th century, the number of inhabitants fluctuated between 278 and 371. Due to refugees after World War II, the population jumped by 30% to 411 people (from 316 in 1939). By 1961, the municipality had grown by 14% to 475 residents.

=== Thomashardt ===
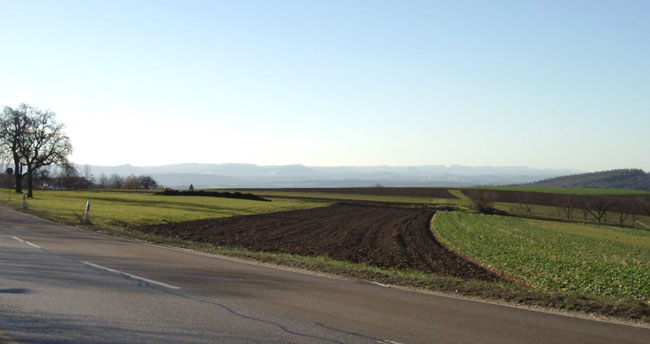
View towards the southwest in Thomashardt

Thomashardt has always had more residents than Hegenlohe, although the percentage fluctuations were in line with Hegenlohe. In the 19th century, the municipality had between 309 and 414 inhabitants. After the end of World War II, the population grew by 32% to 433 people (from 327 in 1939). Until 1961, the population increased by 20% to 545.

== Politics ==
=== Coat of Arms ===
Coat of arms of Lichtenwald

Official blazon: "In gold (yellow) over a green triple mount a red beechnut slanting downwards to the left on a green stalk with a green leaf pointing diagonally upwards to the left, crossed with a red oak acorn slanting downwards on a green stalk with a green leaf pointing diagonally upwards."

The new coat of arms could only be used from 13 December 1971 (almost a year after the founding of Lichtenwald). A previously announced competition in the municipality did not produce any usable results for the coat of arms, but important suggestions came from the Archives Directorate in Stuttgart. Regarding the interpretation of the coat of arms, the authority states: "The coat of arms contains simplified components of the two former town coats of arms that became extinct with the merger. These components, an oak leaf with acorn for Hegenlohe and a beech leaf with beechnut for Thomashardt, are connected in the manner of a diagonal quatrefoil and are intended to point to the achieved unity of the two municipal parts. At the same time, this motif derived from the Schurwald flora can be associated with the new municipal name. The green triple mount in the new coat of arms, as in the two previous ones, commemorates the topographical location of the municipality in the Schurwald area."

=== Mayor ===
Ferdinand Rentschler was re-elected in February 2019 with 70.54% of the vote.

=== Municipal Council ===
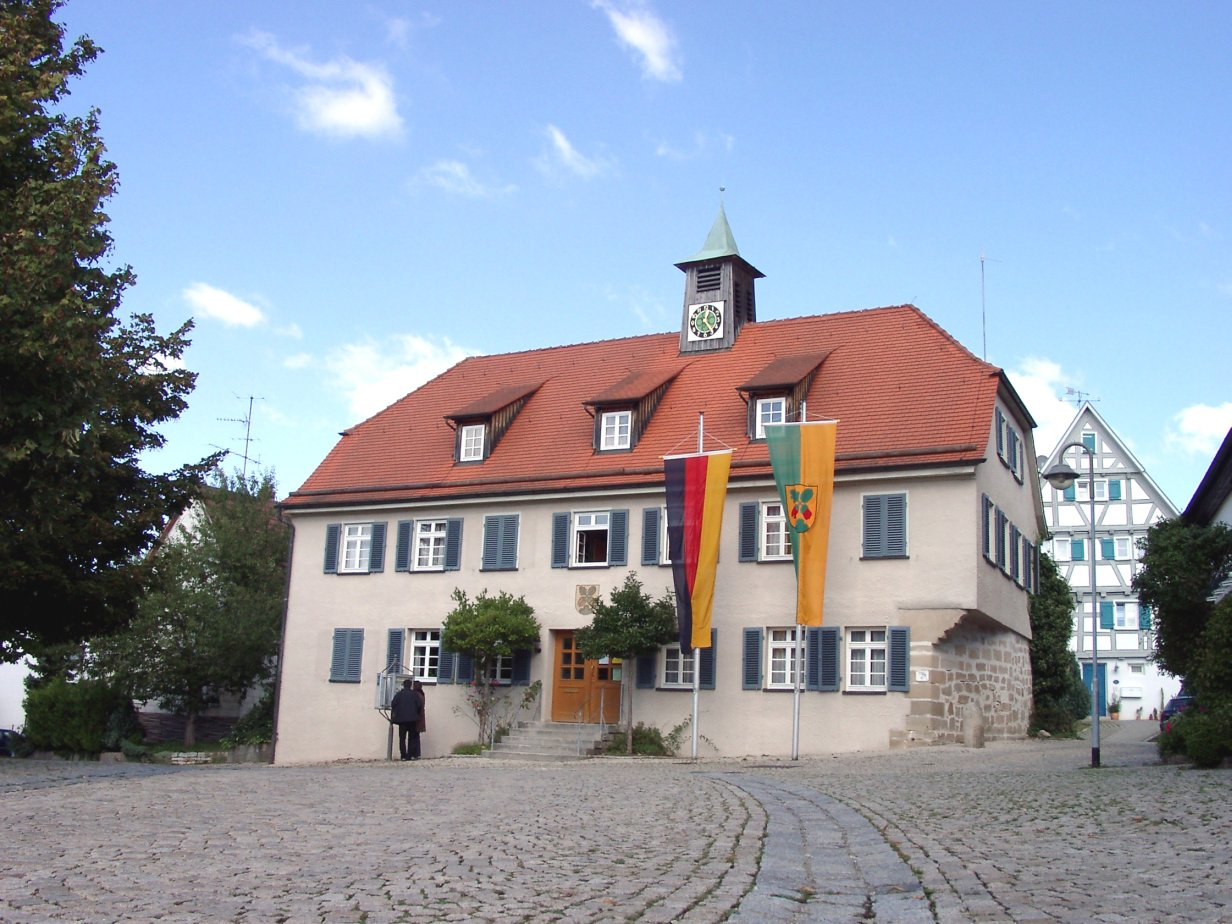
Town hall in Thomashardt

The municipal council in Lichtenwald has 12 members. The last municipal elections were held on 26 May 2019. The municipal council consists of the elected volunteer municipal councillors and the mayor as chairman. The mayor has a vote in the municipal council.

== Economy and Infrastructure ==
=== History ===
Until the beginning of the 20th century, agriculture and forestry constituted the main sources of income for the residents of both municipalities, and charcoal burning also took place. Craftsmen met local needs. The two mills in the Reichenbach valley were the largest commercial operations for centuries - one was the feudal mill for grains, the other was the oil mill, later used as a bone mill and today as a sawmill.

Since 1930, employment in agriculture has continuously declined. Most residents now commute to work in the cities (in 1987, 79.6% of the 1,172 employed people from Lichtenwald worked in cities in the Neckar and Fils valleys). The number of residential buildings in Hegenlohe increased by 150% between 1945 and 1969. Due to improved income conditions and the resulting increase in tax revenue, infrastructure such as water supply and sewerage could be significantly improved and expanded in the 1950s. The expansion of hiking trails also greatly promoted opportunities for local recreation. Thus, present-day Lichtenwald transformed from two farming villages into a lively residential community.

=== Current Situation ===
The businesses located in Lichtenwald offer around 130 jobs, with the municipality being the largest employer. Lichtenwald is therefore primarily a residential and commuter town. With the development of the Thomashardt-Ost area with a commercial section, they hope to create additional local jobs and thus to increase business tax revenues. About 50% of the available commercial building plots have already been sold, and will soon be developed. A few large-scale and part-time agricultural operations cultivate the approximately 286 hectares of arable land.

Since the completion of the "Thomashardt-Ost" commercial area, there are shopping opportunities in the town again. In early May 2014, a supermarket with 840 square meters of retail space, a beverage store, and a bakery branch with a standing cafe opened there. Fresh fruit, vegetables, sausages and milk can be purchased from local farmers.

In the 1990s, each district still had a "mom-and-pop" store, but they had to close due to being uneconomical. Two bank branches (Volksbank and KSK Esslingen-Nürtingen) also closed.

=== Election results ===
The municipality of Lichtenwald promoted high voter turnout during elections. In the 2005 federal election, Lichtenwald had the sixth highest voter turnout of all municipalities in Baden-Württemberg at 87.78%.

== Culture and Sights ==
Despite its rather modest size, Lichtenwald has a cultural program. In 2003 there were around 8,000 visitors, more than half from outside the town. The local artists decisively shape the cultural program as well as the municipal image. The water tower is the best example of this, causing a sensation far beyond the district with its ceramic tile mosaic. The cultural program stands under a different motto each year, with the themes in 2004 revolving around Eduard Mörike and EU enlargement. For example, in June 2004 there was an international intarsia exhibition with artists from France, Poland, the Czech Republic and Russia.

Well-known artists from and in the town include actor Ernst Specht, pianist Martin Pillwein, his wife and artist Carmen Pillwein, intarsia artist Eberhard Scheihing, the artist couple Angie and René Heinze, pianist Gunhilde Cramer, soprano Constanze Seitz, baritone Walter Grupp, artist Dieter Meyer-Jacobi, sculptor Bertram Seitz, and juggler Andreas Wittig.

=== Adult Education Center Lichtenwald ===
Due to the precarious financial situation of the municipality, the Lichtenwald Adult Education Center successfully separated from the Esslingen Adult Education Center association in 2003/04 and is now integrated into the municipal administration. Financially, the material costs are covered, but not the personnel costs. The Adult Education Center in Lichtenwald is not just about teaching, but also integrates a complete cultural program and a children's program. In the first semester, around 3,000 people participated in the program, many from the Waiblingen, Göppingen and Esslingen areas.

=== Sights and Natural Monuments ===
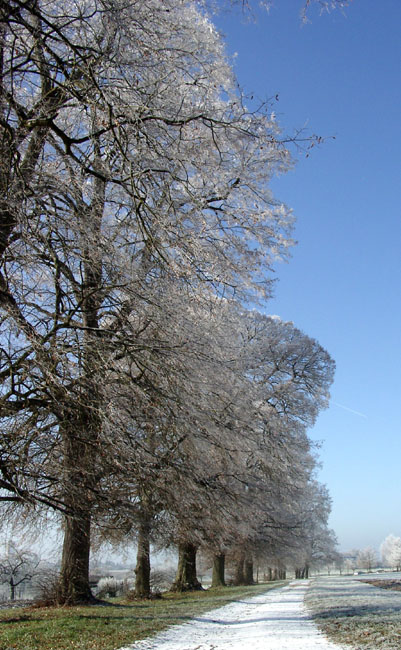
Linden tree avenue with 38 trees near Thomashardt

In Hegenlohe, the Protestant parish church was completed in 1479 with the parsonage, rectory barn and neighboring bakehouse. An attraction in Thomashardt is the newly designed village square with the town hall as part of the village renovation, as well as the artistically designed water tower with an accessible platform and a magnificent distant view of the Swabian Alb from Hohenstaufen to Hohenzollern. At the upper part of the tower, the local artist couple Heinze has installed a colorful ceramic tile mosaic in the shape of a water droplet.

Several individual trees or tree groups in Lichtenwald are considered natural monuments. These include the village linden tree next to the church in Hegenlohe, planted around 1800, which is 20 meters tall with a circumference of 3.2 meters. Due to lack of stability caused by an almost completely hollow trunk, this tree had to be cut down in spring 2012. A new linden tree was planted in the same spot. Another natural monument is the Schönbrücklesoak about 800 meters east of Hegenlohe in the forest, which is over 330 years old, 45 meters high and has a circumference of 4.3 meters. There is also a linden tree avenue near Thomashardt with 38 trees, about 30 meters tall and 170 years old.

=== Events ===
Regular annual major events in Lichtenwald include the theater performances by the theater division of TSV Lichtenwald in January in the community hall. There is also a Lichtenwald Half Marathon, which has about 1,000 participants and guests is by far the largest event in Lichtenwald. Furthermore, the Lichtenwald Adult Education Center (see above) organizes numerous lectures. The various clubs (Edelweiss Hiking Club, church choir, singing club, etc.) also contribute to community life with annual festivals.
