= Aichwald =

- Municipality
- Coat of arms

- Location of Aichwald within Esslingen district
- Interactive map of Aichwald
- Location within Germany Location within Baden-Württemberg
- Coordinates: 48°45′29″N 9°22′49″E
- Country: Germany
- State: Baden-Württemberg
- Admin. region: Stuttgart
- District: Esslingen

Government
  - Mayor (2019–27): Andreas Jarolim

Area
  - Total: 14.67 km^{2} (5.66 sq mi)
- Elevation: 450 m (1,480 ft)

Population (2025-12-31)
  - Total: 7,291
  - Density: 497.0/km^{2} (1,287/sq mi)
- Time zone: UTC+01:00 (CET)
  - Summer (DST): UTC+02:00 (CEST)
- Postal codes: 73771–73773
- Dialling codes: 0711
- Vehicle registration: ES
- Website: www.gemeinde-aichwald.de

Aichwald (German pronunciation: [ˈaɪçvalt]) is a municipality in the district of Esslingen in Baden-Württemberg in southern Germany.

== Municipality arrangement ==
Aichwald consists of the formerly independent municipalities Aichelberg, Aichschieß and Schanbach. For former municipality Aichelberg Aichelberg the village belongs (2355 inhabitants, as at 31 July 2010). For former municipality Aichschieß the village Aichschieß include (1 580 inhabitants) and the hamlet Krummhardt (759 inhabitants) and the proofs of former village Egli Weiler. For former municipality Schanbach the village Schanbach include (2639 inhabitants) and the place Lobenrot (242 inhabitants).

== Partnerships ==
Aichwald maintains friendly links to the city of Böhlen (district of Leipzig in Saxony) and to the market town Finkenstein am Faaker See (in Carinthia, Austria).

== Transportation ==
Aichwald has no train station of its own, only Couch connections are available. Since 2009, the BürgerBus Aichwald links the towns of Schanbach, Aichelberg, Aichschieß, Krummhardt and Lobenrot. The BürgerBus runs twice in the morning and twice in the afternoon.

== Education ==
Aichwald has in the district Schanbach a basic and Werkrealschule and has field offices for primary classes in Aichelberg and Aichschieß. There are three municipal nursery schools in one town and a forest nursery in Aich Schießer forest. A music school currently serves approximately 400 students with a comprehensive teaching program. Furthermore, an independent in Aichwald Volkshochschule .

== Waste ==
The waste management company of the district Esslingen is responsible for disposing of the waste. There are separate collections for organic waste, household waste and paper. Packaging is collected under the Green Dot in the so-called yellow sacks. Bulky waste is picked up annually for free against the delivery of two vouchers or can be brought to a disposal station. At these disposal stations, electrical and metal scrap and other recyclable materials will be collected. Waste such as fluorescent lamps and coatings are collected as hazardous waste.

== Attractions ==
The breeding Häusle in Aichschieß Aichwald has an impressive number of architectural and cultural monuments that bear witness to centuries of history. In addition to the scenic location, these monuments mainly contribute to the charm of the Schurwald community. Since Aichschieß was not along the main axes of transportation, its center is particularly well preserved (half-timbered houses around the church). In the forest below Schanbach are the remains of a small find medieval castle . Particularly outstanding are the four historical church buildings. There is a former pilgrimage church in Aichelberg, today located halfway through an open field above the village (murals from the mid-15th century, crucifix 17th century, baroque images of the former gallery). The Church in Krummhardt is one of the most charming village churches in the district of Esslingen (amenities rural baroque style). In Schanbach is a church with a late medieval choir tower. In Aichschieß is the village church St. Gereon and St. Margaretha (crucifix from the Ulm School in 1500, the interior murals dating from around 1330, which are among the oldest in the region, also other murals from the period around 1500. The stained glass windows of the three windows in the choir are from the glass artist Renate Gross from Gilching (Bavaria), the Taufdeckel by Karl Ulrich Nuss and other works of art). On the site of the former school building is located the so-called breeding homeowners, a tiny cell in which not only criminals were imprisoned, but also where unmarried mothers had to spend fourteen days on bread and water, after they had been exhorted from the pulpit (reprimanded).

Hetty Krist, Angels Aichwald (color lithograph 2010) Since 2003, every two years in August

== Notable people ==
- Gottlob Eberhard von Hafner (1785–1858), born in Aichelberg, Protestant theologian, Generalsuperintendent in Heilbronn, member of Landtag
- Frieder Gadesmann (geboren 1943 in Celle), Protestant theologian, educational scientist, manager of Kunstkreises Aichwald
