= Kirchheim (electoral district) =

State electoral district of Germany

8: Kirchheim
- Electoral district for the Landtag of Baden-Württemberg
- Esslingen in 2026
- District: Esslingen
- Electorate: 121,291 (2026)
- Major settlements: Altbach, Baltmannsweiler, Bissingen an der Teck, Deizisau, Dettingen unter Teck, Erkenbrechtsweiler, Hochdorf, Holzmaden, Kirchheim unter Teck, Köngen, Lenningen, Lichtenwald, Neidlingen, Notzingen, Oberboihingen, Ohmden, Owen, Plochingen, Unterensingen, Weilheim an der Teck, Wendlingen am Neckar, and Wernau (Neckar)

Current electoral district
- Party: CDU
- Member: Natalie Pfau-Weller

Kirchheim is an electoral constituency (German: Wahlkreis) represented in the Landtag of Baden-Württemberg. Since 2026, it has elected one member via first-past-the-post voting. Voters cast a second vote under which additional seats are allocated proportionally state-wide. Under the constituency numbering system, it is designated as constituency 8. It is wholly within the district of Esslingen.

== Geography ==
The constituency includes the municipalities of Altbach, Baltmannsweiler, Bissingen an der Teck, Deizisau, Dettingen unter Teck, Erkenbrechtsweiler, Hochdorf, Holzmaden, Kirchheim unter Teck, Köngen, Lenningen, Lichtenwald, Neidlingen, Notzingen, Oberboihingen, Ohmden, Owen, Plochingen, Unterensingen, Weilheim an der Teck, Wendlingen am Neckar, and Wernau (Neckar), within the district of Esslingen.

There were 121,291 eligible voters in 2026.

== Members ==
=== First mandate ===
Both prior to and since the electoral reforms for the 2026 election, the winner of the plurality of the vote (first-past-the-post) in every constituency won the first mandate.

Election	Member	Party	%
1976	Fritz Hopmeier	CDU	
1980	Fritz Hopmeier	CDU	
1984	Fritz Hopmeier	CDU	
1988	Fritz Hopmeier	CDU	
1992	Fritz Hopmeier	CDU	
1996	Gisela Meister-Scheufelen	CDU	
April 2000	Dirk Ommeln	CDU	
2001	Karl Zimmermann	CDU	
2006	Karl Zimmermann	CDU	41.6
2011	Karl Zimmermann	CDU	38.6
2016	Andreas Schwarz	Green	30.5
2021	Andreas Schwarz	Green	33.1
2026	Natalie Pfau-Weller	CDU	36.7

=== Second mandate ===
Prior to the electoral reforms for the 2026 election, the seats in the state parliament were allocated proportionately amongst parties which received more than 5% of valid votes across the state. The seats that were won proportionally for parties that did not win as many first mandates as seats they were entitled to, were allocated to their candidates which received the highest proportion of the vote in their respective constituencies. This meant that following some elections, a constituency would have one or more members elected under a second mandate.

Prior to 2011, these second mandates were allocated to the party candidates who got the greatest number of votes, whilst from 2011-2021, these were allocated according to percentage share of the vote.

Election	Member	Party	Member	Party	Member	Party
1976	Gerhard Remppis	SPD				
1980	Gerhard Remppis	SPD				
1984	Gerhard Remppis	SPD				
1988						
1992	Carla Bregenzer	SPD	Richard Eckert	REP		
1996	Carla Bregenzer	SPD	Richard Eckert	REP	Marianne Erdich-Sommer	Grüne
2001	Carla Bregenzer	SPD				
2006	Carla Bregenzer	SPD				
May 2008	Sabine Fohler	SPD				
2011					Andreas Schwarz	Grüne
2016	Andreas Kenner	SPD	Sabine Kurtz	CDU		
2021	Andreas Kenner	SPD	Natalie Pfau-Weller	CDU		

== Election results ==
=== 2026 election ===
State election (2026): Kirchheim
Notes:	Blue background denotes the winner of the electorate vote. Pink background denotes a candidate elected from their party list. Yellow background denotes an electorate win by a list member, or other incumbent. A ✓ or ✗ denotes status of any incumbent, win or lose respectively.						
Party	Candidate	Votes	%	±%	Party votes	%	±%
CDU	Natalie Pfau-Weller	32,297	36.7	▲12.3	27,064	30.7	▲6.3
Greens	✗ Andreas Schwarz	24,302	27.6	▼5.5	27,535	31.2	▼1.9
AfD	Markus Berthold	16,337	18.6	▲9.0	16,220	18.4	▲8.9
SPD	Tonja Brinks	5,900	6.7	▼5.9	4,548	5.2	▼7.5
FDP	Nicole Falkenstein	3,496	4.0	▼6.4	3,985	4.5	▲0.6
Left	Anil Beşli	3,129	3.6	▲0.8	3,017	3.4	▲0.6
FW					1,748	2.0	▲0.6
BSW	Heinrich Brinker	1,283	1.5		1,191	1.4	
APT					705	0.8	
Volt	Marvin Clauß	861	1.0		555	0.6	
PARTEI					313	0.4	▼1.2
dieBasis					286	0.3	▼1.1
Values	Bernd Rieg	400	0.5		256	0.3	
Bündnis C					209	0.2	
Pensioners					130	0.1	
Team Todenhöfer					125	0.1	
ÖDP					109	0.1	▼0.6
PdF					61	0.1	
Verjüngungsforschung					53	0.1	
KlimalisteBW					31	0.0	▼0.7
Humanists					25	0.0	
Informal votes		639			478		
Total valid votes		88,005			88,166		
Turnout		88,644	73.1	▲5.8			
CDU gain from Greens	Majority	7,995	9.1				

=== 2021 election ===
State election (2026): Kirchheim
Party	Candidate	Votes	%	±%
Greens	Andreas Schwarz	26,552	33.1	▲2.6
CDU	Natalie Pfau-Weller	19,560	24.4	▼2.1
SPD	Andreas Kenner	10,111	12.6	▼1.5
FDP	Ralph Kittl	8,279	10.3	▲2.1
AfD	Christof Deutscher	7,638	9.5	▼4.7
Left	Hüseyin Sahin	2,236	2.8	▲1.0
PARTEI	Kai Röhm	1,229	1.5	
dieBasis	Uwe Allgaier	1,123	1.4	
FW	Erkan Erdem	1,118	1.4	
ÖDP	Regina Pelzer	564	0.7	▲0.2
WiR2020	Sabine Reichert	585	0.7	
KlimalisteBW	Lea Aschmann	569	0.7	
Independent	Fabian Bodenstein	552	0.7	▲0.5
Majority		6,992	8.7	
Rejected ballots		476	0.6	▼0.2
Turnout		80,592	67.3	▼7.1
Registered electors		119,713		
Greens hold		Swing		

== See also ==
- Politics of Baden-Württemberg
- Landtag of Baden-Württemberg
