= Friedrich Benjamin Osiander =

German obstetrician

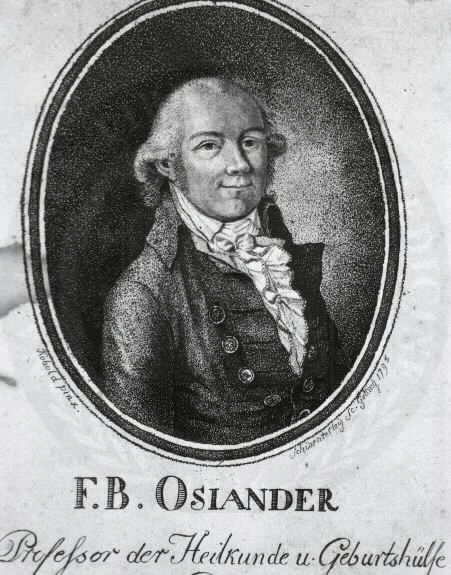
Friedrich Benjamin Osiander (1759-1822)

Friedrich Benjamin Osiander (9 February 1759, Zell unter Aichelberg – 25 May 1822, Göttingen) was an obstetrician at Göttingen, who invented uterine traction forceps. He was the father of obstetrician Johann Friedrich Osiander.

He studied medicine at the University of Tübingen, and following graduation (1779), settled as a general practitioner in Kirchheim unter Teck. In 1792 he became an associate professor of obstetrics at the University of Göttingen.

== Principal works ==
- Lehrbuch der Hebammenkunst : sowohl zum Unterricht angehender Hebammen als zum Lesebuch für jede Mutter, 1796 - Textbook of midwifery.
- Neue Denkwürdigkeiten für Aerzte und Geburtshelfer, 1797 - New memorandum for physicians and obstetricians.
- Handbuch der Entbindungskunst, 1818 - Handbook of obstetrics.
