= Ebersbach an der Fils =

German town

- Town
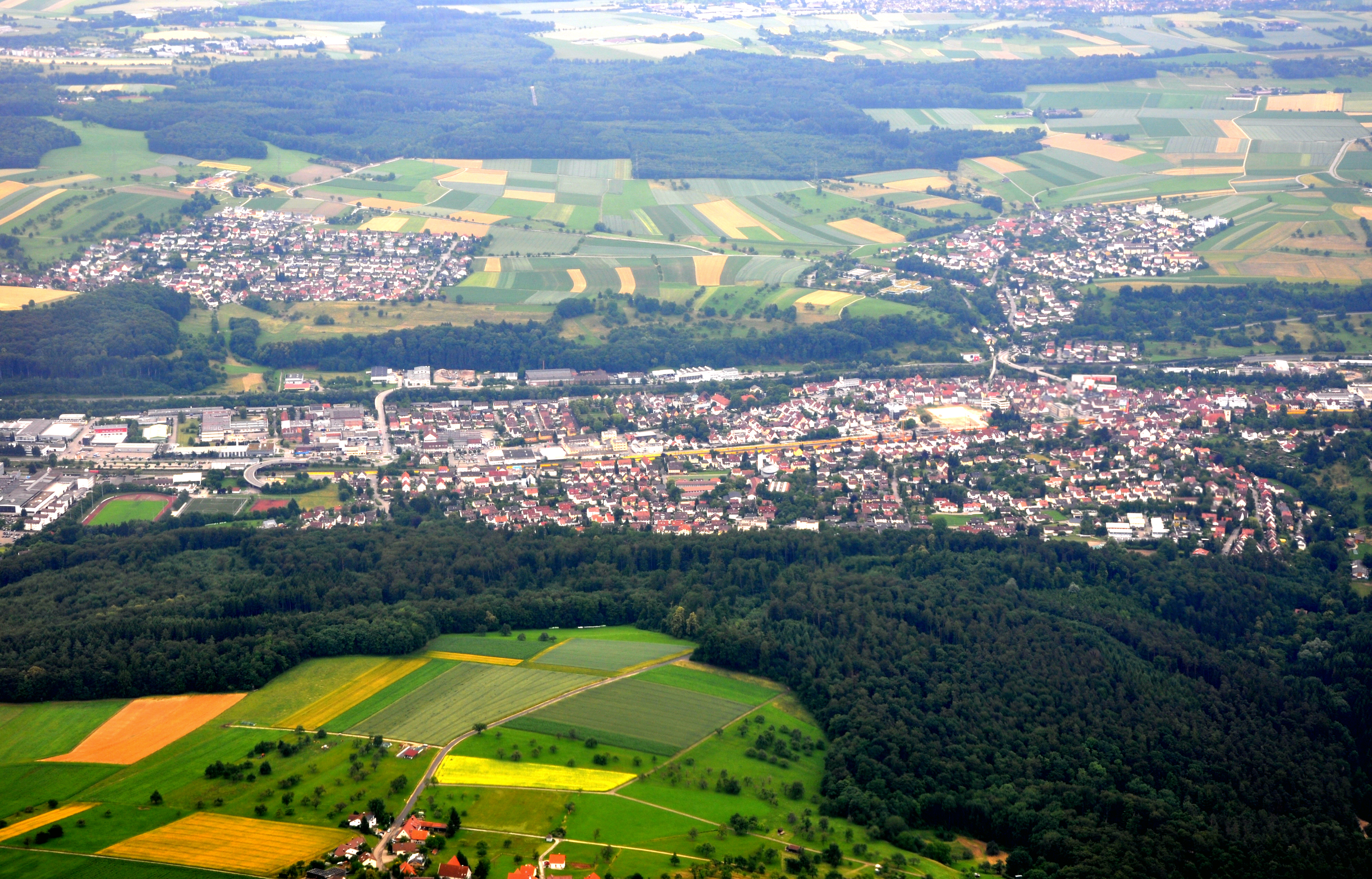
- Aerial view of Ebersbach an der Fils

- Coat of arms

- Location of Ebersbach an der Fils within Göppingen district
- Interactive map of Ebersbach an der Fils
- Location within Germany Location within Baden-Württemberg
- Coordinates: 48°42′53″N 9°31′25″E
- Country: Germany
- State: Baden-Württemberg
- Admin. region: Stuttgart
- District: Göppingen

Area
  - Total: 26.26 km^{2} (10.14 sq mi)
- Elevation: 292 m (958 ft)

Population (2025-12-31)
  - Total: 15,550
  - Density: 592.2/km^{2} (1,534/sq mi)
- Time zone: UTC+01:00 (CET)
  - Summer (DST): UTC+02:00 (CEST)
- Postal codes: 73061
- Dialling codes: 07163
- Vehicle registration: GP
- Website: www.ebersbach.de

Ebersbach an der Fils (German pronunciation: [ˈeːbɐsbax ʔan deːɐ̯ ˈfɪls], lit. 'Ebersbach on the Fils') is a town in the district of Göppingen in Baden-Württemberg, in southern Germany.

== History ==
Ebersbach an der Fils was first mentioned in 1170. In 1299, it became a possession of the County of Württemberg, which already owned property nearby. Throughout the Middle Ages, Ebersbach was under the jurisdiction of the city of Göppingen. Under the Kingdom of Württemberg, Göppingen's district was reorganized as Oberamt Göppingen, which became Landkreis Göppingen, its contemporary incarnation, in 1938. Ebersbach developed considerably after World War II, first spreading to the west of the city. The city expanded eastward, northeastward, and then westward in the 1980s. Ebersbach grew politically in the 1970s with the incorporation of the municipalities of Roßwälden in 1972 and Bünzwangen and Weiler ob der Fils in 1975.

=== Bünzwangen ===
Bünzwangen became a possession of the Duchy of Württemberg in 1568 and from then on was assigned to the district of Göppingen.

=== Roßwälden ===
During the Protestant Reformation, Roßwälden became increasingly dependent upon Württemberg as it controlled more and more property nearby until it was annexed by the Duchy. Roßwälden was assigned to the district of Kirchheim unter Teck until 1938, when it was reassigned to the district of Göppingen.

=== Weiler ob der Fils ===
Weiler was a borough of Roßwälden until 1905 and was thus assigned to Oberamt Kirchheim until 1938, when it too was assigned to Göppingen's district.

== Geography ==
The city (Stadt) of Ebersbach an der Fils lies on the western edge of the district of Göppingen, along its border with the district of Esslingen am Neckar. Ebersbach is physically located between the Schurwald and Welzheim Forest to the north, and the foothills of the central Swabian Jura to the south, on the river Fils. The Fils flows through the municipality from east to west. Elevation above sea level in the municipal area ranges from a high of 482 meters (1,581 ft) Normalnull (NN) to a low of 264 meters (866 ft) NN.

== Politics ==
Ebersbach an der Fils has four boroughs (Ortsteile): Ebersbach an der Fils, Bünzwangen, Roßwälden, and Weiler ob der Fils. There are also six villages within the municipal area: Birkenhöfe, Büchenbronn, Erlenhof, Krapfenreut, Lindenhof, and Sulpach. There is one abandoned village, Stainboß.

Ebersbach has been in a mutually-beneficial municipal association (vereinbarte Verwaltungsgemeinschaft) with the neighboring municipality of Schlierbach since 1975.

=== Coat of arms ===
Ebersbach's coat of arms displays a boar in yellow, standing upon green ground and facing left, upon a field of red. The boar has been a motif of Ebersbach since 1489, though its appearance has varied since then. The municipal coat of arms, which shows the boar standing, was derived from an image from 1535; others, such as a keystone in the parish church, show the boar walking or jumping.

== Transport ==
Ebersbach is connected to Germany's network of roadways by Bundesstraße 10 and its railways by the Fils Valley Railway. Local public transportation is provided by the Filsland Mobilitätsverbund.
