= Notzingen =

- Municipality
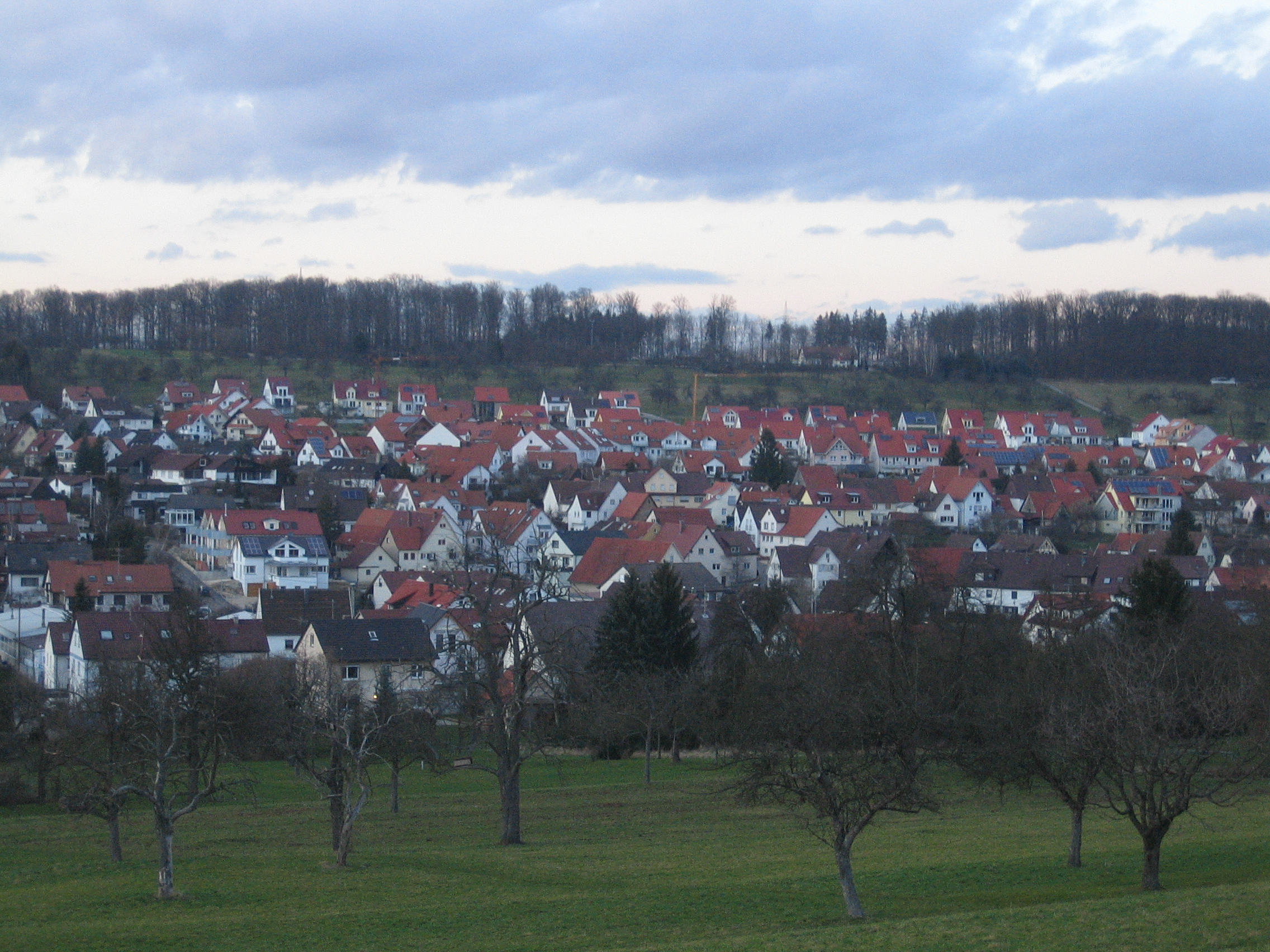

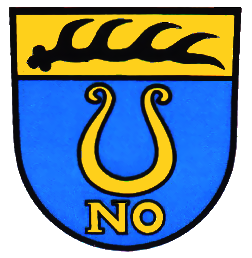
- Coat of arms

- Location of Notzingen within Esslingen district
- Interactive map of Notzingen
- Location within Germany Location within Baden-Württemberg
- Coordinates: 48°40′16″N 9°27′23″E
- Country: Germany
- State: Baden-Württemberg
- Admin. region: Stuttgart
- District: Esslingen

Government
  - Mayor (2019–27): Sven Haumacher

Area
  - Total: 7.7 km^{2} (3.0 sq mi)
- Elevation: 316 m (1,037 ft)

Population (2025-12-31)
  - Total: 3,695
  - Density: 480/km^{2} (1,200/sq mi)
- Time zone: UTC+01:00 (CET)
  - Summer (DST): UTC+02:00 (CEST)
- Postal codes: 73274
- Dialling codes: 07021
- Vehicle registration: ES
- Website: www.notzingen.de

Notzingen (German pronunciation: [ˈnɔtsɪŋən]) is a municipality in the district of Esslingen in Baden-Württemberg in southern Germany.

== Geography ==
Notzingen is east of the district of Esslingen, in a valley between Kirchheim unter Teck and Hochdorf. The town is 35 km (22 mi) southeast from Stuttgart and 50 km (31 mi) from Ulm.

=== Nearby municipalities ===
- Wernau (Neckar)
- Hochdorf (Plochingen)
- Rosswälden
- Schlierbach
- Kirchheim unter Teck

== History ==
=== Prehistory ===
Archaeological findings from the Neolithic period have been discovered in the territory of Notzingen, including a longsword and a burial ground of the Alamanni.

=== Middle Ages ===
Notzingen was first mentioned in written records in 1077/1078. King Henry IV confiscated Notzingen from Count Luitold von Achalm due to his support for Rudolf of Rheinfelden. (It is not certain whether this refers to present-day Notzingen; it could also pertain to Orsingen-Nenzingen, near which there was a vanished settlement named Bächlingen.) Sovereignty over Notzingen passed to the Zähringen family and later to the Dukes of Teck. Around 1270, the Alwer family from Kirchheim acquired estates in Notzingen and began calling themselves after their ancestral castle of Tumnau ("Dummenowe") from 1274 onwards. In the 14th century, Notzingen came under the jurisdiction of Württemberg along with the town of Kirchheim unter Teck, to which it has belonged since then.

In 1360, a chapel was first mentioned in the area.

=== Modern Era ===
Duke Ulrich of Württemberg implemented the Reformation in Notzingen in 1534. The chapel was expanded into a church around 1620. In 1821, the church parish became independent.

Even after the introduction of the new administrative division in the Kingdom of Württemberg, founded in 1806, Notzingen remained under the jurisdiction of the Oberamt Kirchheim, to which it had already been subject during the time of Old Württemberg.

During the Nazi era in Württemberg, the district of Wellingen was incorporated into Notzingen in 1934, and in 1938, the municipality of Notzingen was assigned to the new district of Nürtingen.

From 1945 to 1952, the municipality was part of the post-war state of Württemberg-Baden, which was established in 1945 in the American Occupation Zone, and from 1952 onwards, it belonged to the new state of Baden-Württemberg.

In 1972, during a citizens' hearing, 70.5% voted against the incorporation into Kirchheim unter Teck. As a result, the municipality remained independent. Since the administrative reform of 1973, Notzingen has been part of the Esslingen district.

=== Population Development ===
1834: 1,035 inhabitants
1861: 1,121 inhabitants
1900: 1,048 inhabitants
1939: 1,130 inhabitants
1946: 1,623 inhabitants
1950: 1,637 inhabitants
1961: 1,892 inhabitants
1970: 2,215 inhabitants
1990: 3,277 inhabitants
1995: 3,512 inhabitants
2000: 3,525 inhabitants
2005: 3,494 inhabitants
2010: 3,552 inhabitants
2015: 3,631 inhabitants
2020: 3,623 inhabitants
2022: 3,631 inhabitants

== Politics ==
=== Mayor ===
- 1952 - 1987 Helmut Maier (independent)
- 1987 – 2011 Jochen Flogaus (independent)
- from 2011 Sven Haumacher (CDU)

=== Municipal council ===
The results of the local government elections in May 2014:

CDU	46,42 %	6 seats
Unabhängige Kommunale Wählervereinigung	33,14 %	5 seats
SPD	20,44 %	3 seats

== Religions ==
- Protestant: 1941
- Roman Catholic: 815

== Demographics ==
Population development:

Year	Inhabitants
1990	3,277
2001	3,523
2011	3,609
2021	3,610

== Economy and infrastructure ==
=== Companies ===
- Eloxal Barz GmbH und Co. KG.
- Le Creuset GmbH

=== Education ===
- Notzingen has one basic school and three kindergartens.

=== Notable peoples from Notzingen ===
- Werner Niefer (1928–1993), Manager of Mercedes-Benz AG; lived in Notzingen
- Hans Ettmayer (born 1946), former Austrian football player lives in Notzingen
- Johannes Muehlhaeuser (1804-1868), founder and first President of the Wisconsin Evangelical Lutheran Synod was from Notzingen.
