= Natalie Pfau-Weller =

German politician (born 1987)

Member of the Landtag of Baden-Württemberg
- Incumbent
- Assumed office 14 April 2021
- Constituency: Kirchheim

Personal details
- Born: 9 October 1987 (age 38) Kirchheim unter Teck
- Party: Christian Democratic Union (since 2009)

Natalie Pfau-Weller (née Pfau; born 9 October 1987 in Kirchheim unter Teck) is a German politician serving as a member of the Landtag of Baden-Württemberg since 2021. She has served as group leader of the Christian Democratic Union in the city council of Kirchheim unter Teck since 2020.
