= Rupertus Meldenius =

German Lutheran theologian (1582–1651)

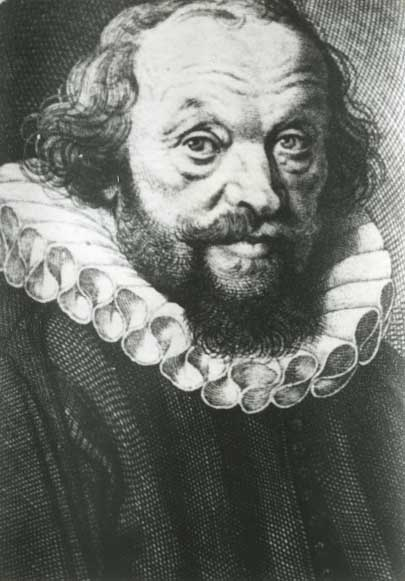
- Born: March 22, 1582
- Died: 1651 (aged 68–69)

Rupertus Meldenius, aka Peter Meiderlin and Peter Meuderlinus (born March 22, 1582, in Oberacker; died June 1, 1651, in Augsburg) was a Lutheran theologian and educator. The son of a Swabian priest, he studied in Adelberg and after school visited the lower Konvikts in Maulbronn at the Tübinger Stift, where he met Johann Valentin Andreae. Meiderlin was a student of Mathias Haffenreffer and in 1601 obtained a master's degree. In 1605, he was at the Repentant convent in Tübingen. In 1607, he assumed the Chair of the deceased philologist Martin Crusius. After a post as senior deacon in Kirchheim unter Teck in 1612, he was "Ephorus" of the Evangelical College of St. Anna in Augsburg. He held this office (with an interruption from 1630 to 1632), until 1650.

As a follower of the Concord, he defended the forerunner of Pietism, Johann Arndt, in the confrontation about the orthodoxy of his teachings. In 1626 he published under the pseudonym Rupertus Meldenius a work entitled Paraenesis votiva per Pace Ecclesia ad Theologos Augustana Confessionis auctore Ruperto Meldenio Theologo (A Reminder for Peace at the Church of the Augsburg Confession of Theologians), in which he argued for peace among the contending parties and unity within the meaning of the Concord, and called for the practice of charity (i.e. Christian love), saying:

Verbo dicam: si nos servaremus in necessariis unitatem, in non necessariis libertatem, in utrisque caritatem, optimo certe loco essent res nostrae (F. Lücke p. 128 mn. 223)

which later developed into the phrase "In necessariis unitas, in dubiis libertas, in omnibus caritas" (In essentials unity, in doubtful things/non-essentials liberty, in all things charity).

== Works ==
- Trewhertzige Erinnerung von der Weiszheit und dem Gelt: welches dem andern vorzuziehen sey; gehalten bei einem Exercitio Oratorio ..., als die Alumni desz Evangelischen Collegii zu Augspurg in etlichen underschiedlichen Sprachen eben von dieser Materia peroriert und ein ansehenliche Prob gelaistet hatten ...; Augsburg, 1622.
- Der kleine Catechismus für die Kipperer ...; Augsburg, 1622.

... bedencken an die Herrn Kipperer und Geltwucherer ...; Augsburg, 1623.

- Paraenesis votiva pro pace Ecclesia ad Theologos Augustanae Confessionis auctore Ruperto Meldenio Theologo; gedruckt von Hieronymus Körnlein, Rothenburg ob der Tauber, 1626 (anonym veröffentlicht ohne Angaben von Jahr, Ort und Verlag). As an appendix added to Friedrich Lücke: Über das Alter, den Verfasser, die ursprüngliche Form und den wahren Sinn des kirchelichen Friedensspruches In necessariis unitas, in non necessariis libertas, in utrisque caritas. Eine litterarhistorische theologische Studie; Göttingen: Verlag der Dieterichschen Buchhandlung, 1850. p. 87
- Laus sive Commendatio Collegii Augustani Evangelici S. Annae; 1639.
