= Hans Ettmayer =

Austrian footballer (1946–2023)

Personal information
- Full name: Johann Ettmayer
- Date of birth: 23 July 1946
- Place of birth: Vienna, Allied-occupied Austria
- Date of death: 1 April 2023 (aged 76)
- Height: 1.72 m (5 ft 8 in)
- Position: Midfielder

Youth career
- 1958–1963: Austria Wien

Senior career*
Years	Team	Apps	(Gls)
1963–1966	Austria Wien	7	(1)
1966–1971	FC Wacker Innsbruck	137	(68)
1971–1975	VfB Stuttgart	97	(34)
1975–1977	Hamburger SV	27	(2)
1977–1978	Lugano		
1978–1981	Freiburger FC	67	(14)
1981–1983	SV Göppingen	45	(13)

International career
1968–1975	Austria	30	(0)

Managerial career
- 1983–1986: SpVgg Rommelshausen
- * Club domestic league appearances and goals

Hans "Buffy" Ettmayer (23 July 1946 – 1 April 2023) was an Austrian footballer who played as a midfielder. He lived in Notzingen.
