= Wernau Clay Pit =

German nature conservation area

- Wernauer Lehmgrube
- IUCN category IV (habitat/species management area)
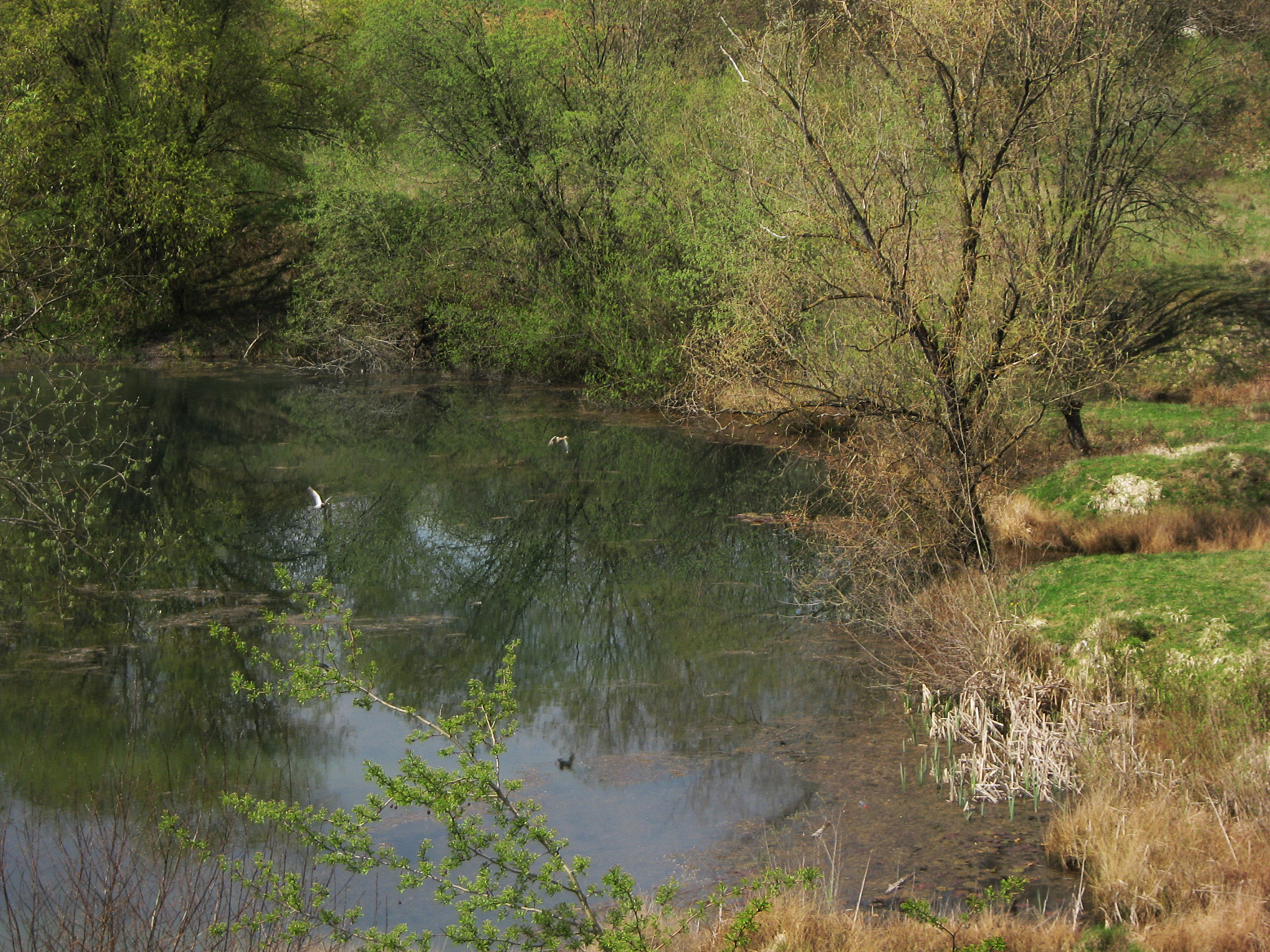
- Interactive map of Wernau Clay Pit
- Location: Germany, Baden-Württemberg, Esslingen, Wernau
- Coordinates: 48°40′46″N 9°25′8.9″E
- Area: 5.5 ha (14 acres)
- Established: June 5, 1981
- Operator: Swabian Jura Association
- Administrator: Stuttgart Regional Commission

The Wernau Clay Pit is a nature conservation area in Wernau, Baden-Würtemberg, Germany established by the Stuttgart Regional Commission on April 15, 1986 (NSG 1.143).

== Location and purpose of protection ==
The 5.5 hectare (ha) conservation area is located southeast of Wernau at an elevation of 310 to 320 meters above sea level and belongs to the nature preserve area of Schlierbacher Platte in the central foreland area of the Swabian Jura mountains. It is classified as a secondary biotope (it was not formed naturally, but from a man-made biotope) with an advanced ecological succession containing wet and dry areas, slopes and water surfaces. The former clay pit is ecologically a very valuable, re-naturalized, near-urban area.

The Wernau Clay Pit is also an important environment for various endangered animals, especially for some regionally endangered amphibians, birds and insects in Baden-Württemberg. It provides a habitat for amphibians like the water frog, common frog, common toad, smooth newt and the yellow-bellied toad, and for birds like the yellowhammer, European greenfinch, European serin, Eurasian blackcap, dunnock, Eurasian wren, common chiffchaff and the white wagtail. Particularly noteworthy is the aquatic insect fauna, like the water scorpion, backswimmers, water scavenger beetle and the larvae of several different types of dragonflies.

Since 1986, the Swabian Jura Association in Wernau has been the custodian of the nature conservation area.

== Literature ==
- Reinhard Wolf, Ulrike Kreh (Hrsg.): Die Naturschutzgebiete im Regierungsbezirk Stuttgart. Thorbecke, Ostfildern 2007, ISBN 978-3-7995-5176-2, S. 503–505
- BRUNS, D. (1992): Beitrag zur Planung von Ersatzbiotopen gemäß § 8 Bundesnaturschutzgesetz am Beispiel von Sukzessionsflächen auf Lehm.‑ Beih. Veröff. Naturschutz Landschaftspflege Bad.‑Württ., 65: 1‑124. ISBN 978-3882511734
- BUCHMANN, H. (1993): Geologie ‑ Der Neckar ‑ Geologisch‑landschaftskundliche Exkursionen in die Umgebung. In: Naturschutzgebiet "Wernauer Baggerseen" im Landkreis Esslingen ‑ Von der Kiesgrube zum Naturreservat.‑ Führer Natur‑ u. Landschaftsschutzgebiete Bad.‑Württ., 21: 33‑44, 44‑47, 364‑419. ISBN 3-88251-186-9
