= Wernau Quarry Ponds =

German nature conservation area

- Wernauer Baggerseen
- IUCN category IV (habitat/species management area)
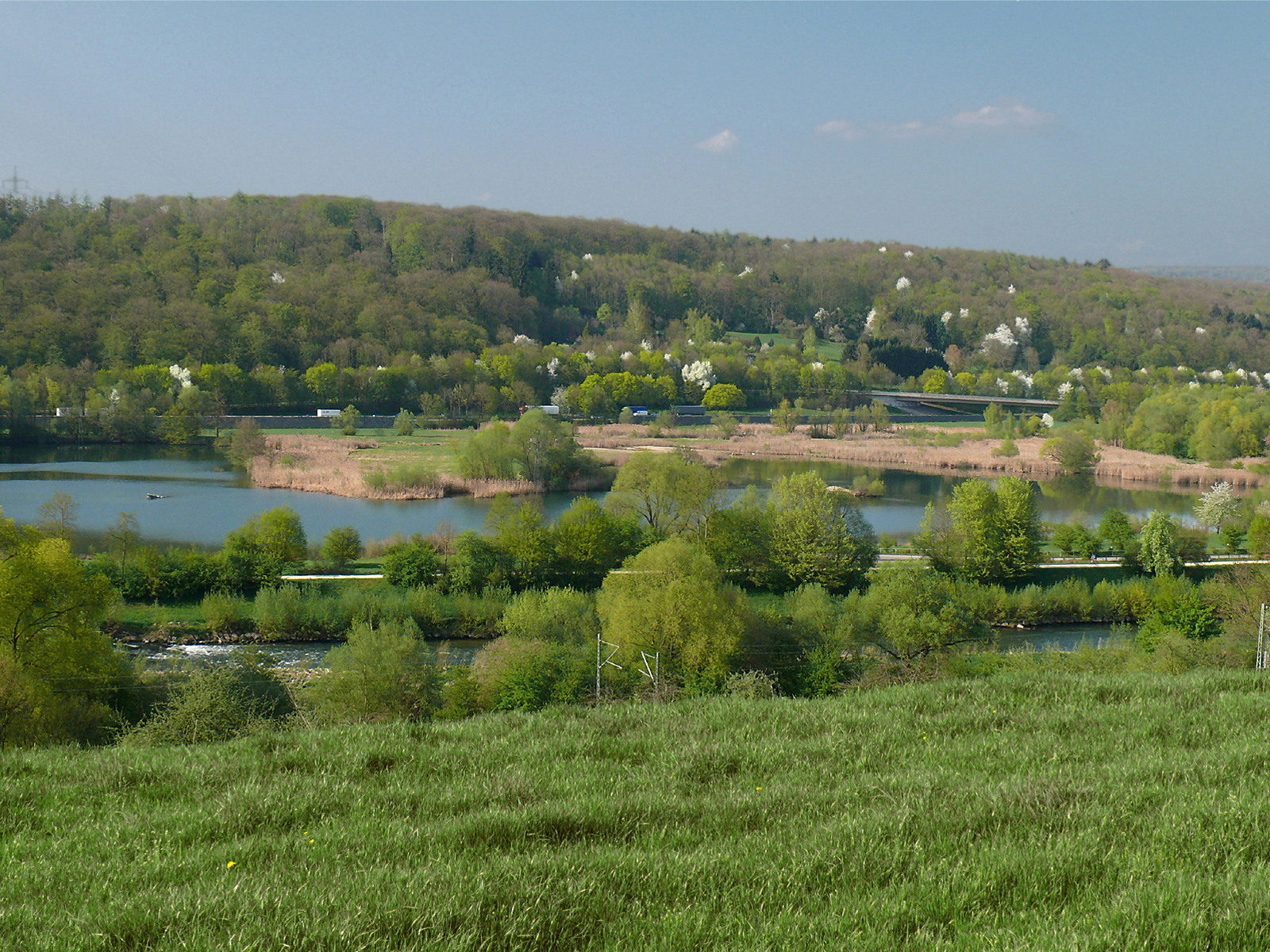
- Interactive map of Wernau Quarry Ponds
- Location: Germany, Baden-Württemberg, Esslingen, Wernau
- Coordinates: 48°41′22.0″N 9°23′46.9″E
- Area: 32.1 ha (79 acres)
- Established: June 5, 1981
- Operator: NABU
- Administrator: Stuttgart Regional Commission

The Wernau Quarry Ponds are a Nature Conservation Area established by the Stuttgart Regional Commission on June 5, 1981 (NSG-Nummer 1.090). They are located within the jurisdictions of Wernau and Wendlingen and the community of Köngen, which are located in the district of Esslingen in the German state of Baden-Württemberg.

== Location and history ==
The 32.1 hectare (ha) nature conservation area is located to the West of the city of Wernau, at an altitude of 255 m above sea level in the Neckar valley. Its part of the Filder Nature Conservation Area and the FFH area 7321-341 Filder.

Up until the end of the 19th century, the Neckar valley between Köngen and Wendlingen mostly consisted of grassy fields. Starting in the 20th century, the landscape changed as gravel mining began, which also produced quarry ponds as a byproduct when rain filled the shallow mines. There was a 20-hectare pond located at the city border of Wendlingen and the Pfauhäuser quarry pond already covered an area of 35 hectare. After gravel mining ended, more and more ponds were being filled in, and the open water started to disappear. The Wernau Quarry Ponds were also at a risk of being filled in and built over. The Germany Union for the Protection of Birds (Deutsche Bund für Vogelschutz DBV) which was the predecessor of today's NABU, applied for the protection of the Wernau Quarry Ponds in 1974. They had been monitoring the ponds for several years and registered over 200 different species of birds. The quarry ponds were officially declared a nature conservation area in June, 1981. The Regional Commission of Stuttgart named DBV as the official superintendent of the nature conservation area. In March 1992, the bordering Neckarwasen was also declared a nature conservation area. The conservation area increased to a total of 45,4 ha and is now being overseen by NABU.

A Daimler AG test track is located directly in the middle of the protected area. Talks between NABU and Daimler AG began in March 1996, with the goal of moving the test track outside of the nature conservation area. NABU's State Chairman Stefan Rösler spoke again with Daimler chairman Dieter Zetsche, in November 2006. Zetsche agreed to move the test track out of the protected area. And with the construction of the new test track in Immendingen, which was opened in September 2018, the test track in Wernau will be closed.

== Purpose of protection ==
The protected area is a valuable environment for both plants and animals and an important waystation for water birds during migration. Furthermore, an informative nature trail has been set up to teach the public about its importance.

200 different species of birds have been identified and registered. Among them are many species whose numbers have drastically reduced in the last years and therefore need special protection. Some examples are the grey heron, little bittern, common merganser, western marsh harrier, common sandpiper, and more.

== Literature ==
- Roland Appl, Günter Schmid und andere: Naturschutzgebiet Wernauer Baggerseen – Von der Kiesgrube zum Naturschutzgebiet, Landesanstalt für Umweltschutz Baden-Württemberg 1993, ISBN 3-88251-186-9
- Reinhard Wolf, Ulrike Kreh (Hrsg.): Die Naturschutzgebiete im Regierungsbezirk Stuttgart. Thorbecke, Ostfildern 2007, ISBN 978-3-7995-5176-2, S. 500–502
