= Lindorf =

- Stadtteil of Kirchheim unter Teck
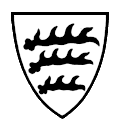
- Coat of arms
- Interactive map of Lindorf
- Location within Germany Location within Baden-Württemberg
- Coordinates: 48°38′47″N 9°24′46″E
- Country: Germany
- State: Baden-Württemberg
- Admin. region: Stuttgart
- District: Esslingen
- Town: Kirchheim unter Teck

Area
  - Total: 2.75 km^{2} (1.06 sq mi)
- Elevation: 340 m (1,120 ft)

Population (2011)
  - Total: 1,468
  - Density: 534/km^{2} (1,380/sq mi)
- Time zone: UTC+01:00 (CET)
  - Summer (DST): UTC+02:00 (CEST)
- Postal codes: 73230
- Dialling codes: 07021

Lindorf is a formerly independent municipality in Esslingen district in Baden-Württemberg and belongs since 1935 to the town Kirchheim unter Teck.

== Geography ==
Lindorf is located about two kilometers west of the Kirchheim unter Teck on the opposite side of the Bundesautobahn 8. The area is 275 hectares.

== History ==
1090 Lindorf is first mentioned in the Bempflingen contract. A "Wernher von Lindorf" is named in this contract as a witness. In the 12th century the place was owned by the House of Zähringen. About the Counts of Aichelberg and the Duke of Teck the village finally came to Württemberg.

On April 1, 1935, the forced incorporation to Kirchheim was carried out, council and mayor were abolished. Only in 1992 was decided by the Kirchheim council to set up again an Ortschaftsrat in Lindorf and to appoint an honorary mayor.

== Buildings ==
A church or chapel lacked Lindorf for a long time until 1961, then the Matthäuskirche could be consecrated.

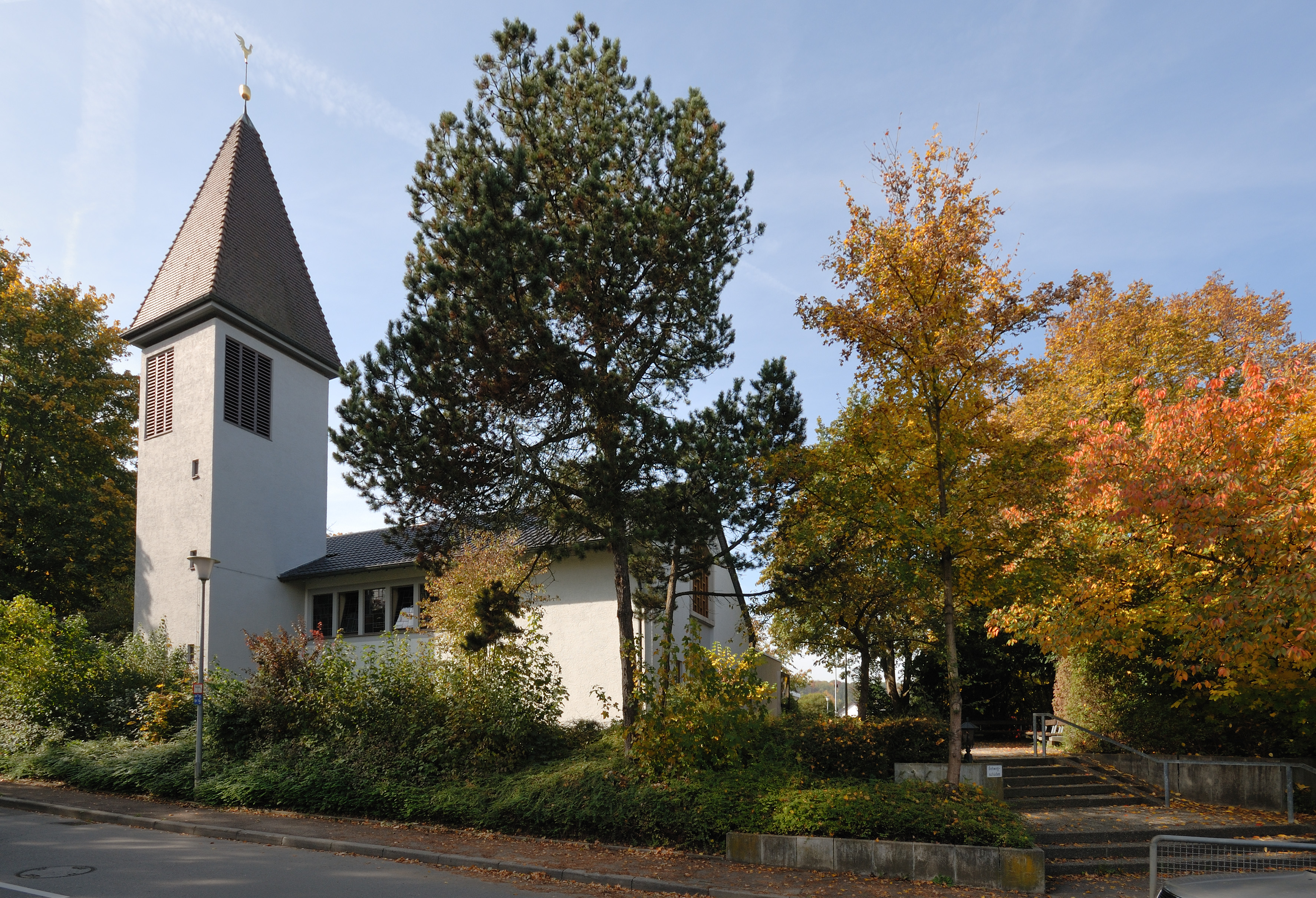
Matthäuskirche Kirchheim-Lindorf

A town hall is in the center since 1829, a private school house was built in 1897. A community center for local clubs was erected in 1984 and in 1998 also an own kindergarten.

== Transportation ==
The Bundesautobahn 8 passes the place. The county road 1204 connects Lindorf to Kirchheim unter Teck and to the main road B 297 towards Nürtingen.
