= In necessariis unitas, in dubiis libertas, in omnibus caritas =

Latin phrase

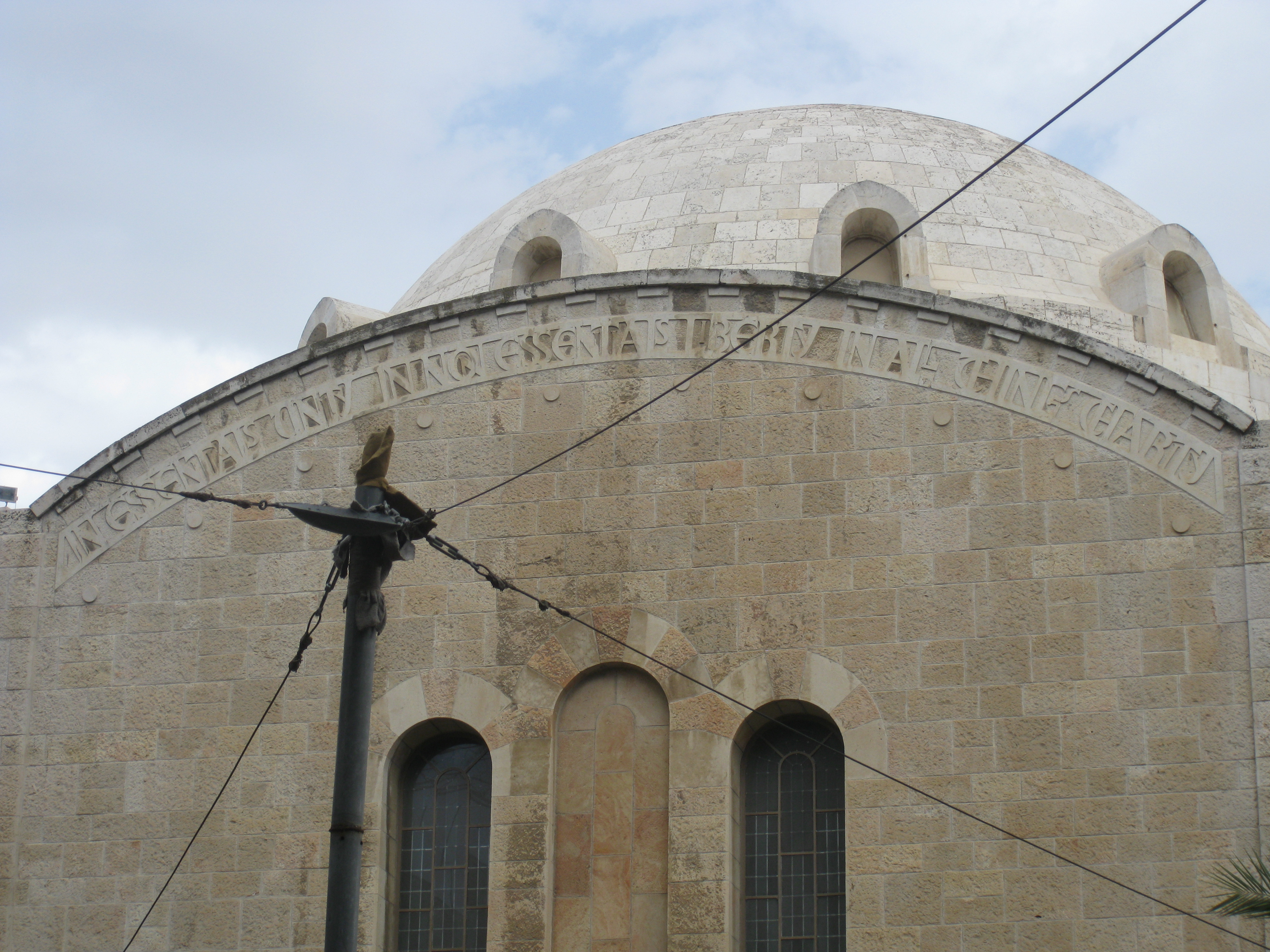
"In essentials unity, in nonessentials liberty, in all things charity" inscribed on the auditorium of the Jerusalem International YMCA.

In necessariis unitas, in dubiis libertas, in omnibus caritas (lit. 'unity in necessaries; liberty in doubts; charity in all') is a Latin phrase. Though historically used primarily in a theological context, it is also notable as the official motto of the National Grange, a secular fraternal organization in the United States.

== Origins and history ==
It is often misattributed to Augustine of Hippo, but seems to have been first used in 1617 by Archbishop of Split (Spalato) Marco Antonio de Dominis in his anti-Papal De Republica Ecclesiastica, where it appears in context as follows (emphasis added):

Quod si in ipsa radice, hoc est sede, vel potius solio Romani pontificis haec abominationis lues purgaretur et ex communi ecclesiae consilio consensuque auferretur hic metus, depressa scilicet hac petra scandali ac ad normae canonicae iustitiam complanata, haberemus ecclesiae atrium aequabile levigatum ac pulcherrimis sanctuarii gemmis splendidissimum. Omnesque mutuam amplecteremur unitatem in necessariis, in non necessariis libertatem, in omnibus caritatem. Ita sentio, ita opto, ita plane spero, in eo qui est spes nostra et non confundemur. Ita sentio, ita opto, ita plane spero, in eo qui est spes nostrae et non confundemur.

Translation:

But if at the very root, that is, the seat, or rather the throne of the Roman pontiff, this evil of abomination were purged, and by the common counsel and consent of the church, this fear was removed; most splendid. And let us all embrace one another, in necessary things unity; in uncertain things liberty; in all things charity. I feel so, I wish so, I hope so plainly, in him who is our hope and we shall not be disappointed. I feel so, I wish so, I hope so plainly, in him who is our hope and we shall not be disappointed.

Before the 21st century, academic consensus was that the source of the quotation was probably Lutheran theologian Peter Meiderlin (known as Rupertus Meldenius), who, in his Paraenesis votiva pro pace ecclesiae ad theologos Augustanae of 1626 had said, "Verbo dicam: Si nos servaremus in necessariis Unitatem, in non-necessariis Libertatem, in utrisque Charitatem, optimo certe loco essent res nostrae", meaning "In a word, let me say: if we might keep in necessary things Unity, in non-necessary things Freedom, and in both Charity, our affairs would certainly be in the best condition." Henk Nellen's 1999 article that showed the phrase had previously been used by De Dominis overturned over a century of academic consensus.

According to Joseph Lecler, the substitution of dubiis for non necessariis (omnibus occurs here, rather than, as in Meiderlin, utrisque) was made in largely Catholic circles, and had the effect of extending "the rule of Meldenius ... to much more than just the necessaria [(for salvation)] and the non necessaria [(for salvation)]", much more than just the "fundamental articles": "the tripartite maxim ... [thus] lost its original Protestant nuance, in order to extend liberty to the entire domain of questions debated, doubtful, and undefined [(non définies par l'Église)]".

== Theological usage ==
The maxim has entered official Catholic teaching when Pope John XXIII's encyclical Ad Petri Cathedram of 29 June 1959 used it favorably. In a section saying that sometimes religious controversies can actually help attain church unity, he says "But the common saying, expressed in various ways and attributed to various authors, must be recalled with approval: in essentials, unity; in doubtful matters, liberty; in all things, charity."

In the United Methodist Church Book of Discipline, the phrase appears in the doctrinal history section as "In essentials, unity; in non-essentials, liberty; and in all things, charity." A few lines later, the mandate is emphasized as "the crucial matter in religion is steadfast love for God and neighbor, empowered by the redeeming and sanctifying work of the Holy Spirit."

== See also ==
- Adiaphora
- List of Latin phrases
- Theologoumenon
