= Max Eyth =

German engineer and writer

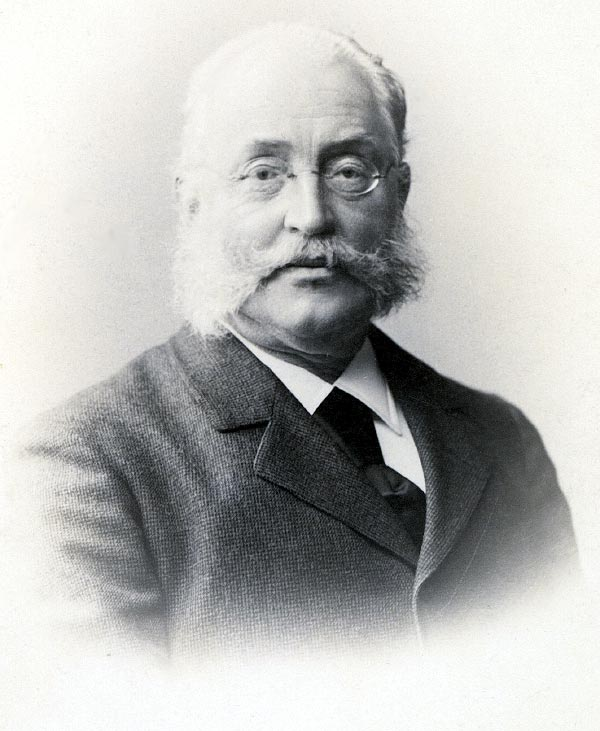
Max von Eyth 1896

Max Eyth (German: [ˈmaks ˈʔaɪt]; 6 May 1836 – 25 August 1906) was a German engineer and writer.

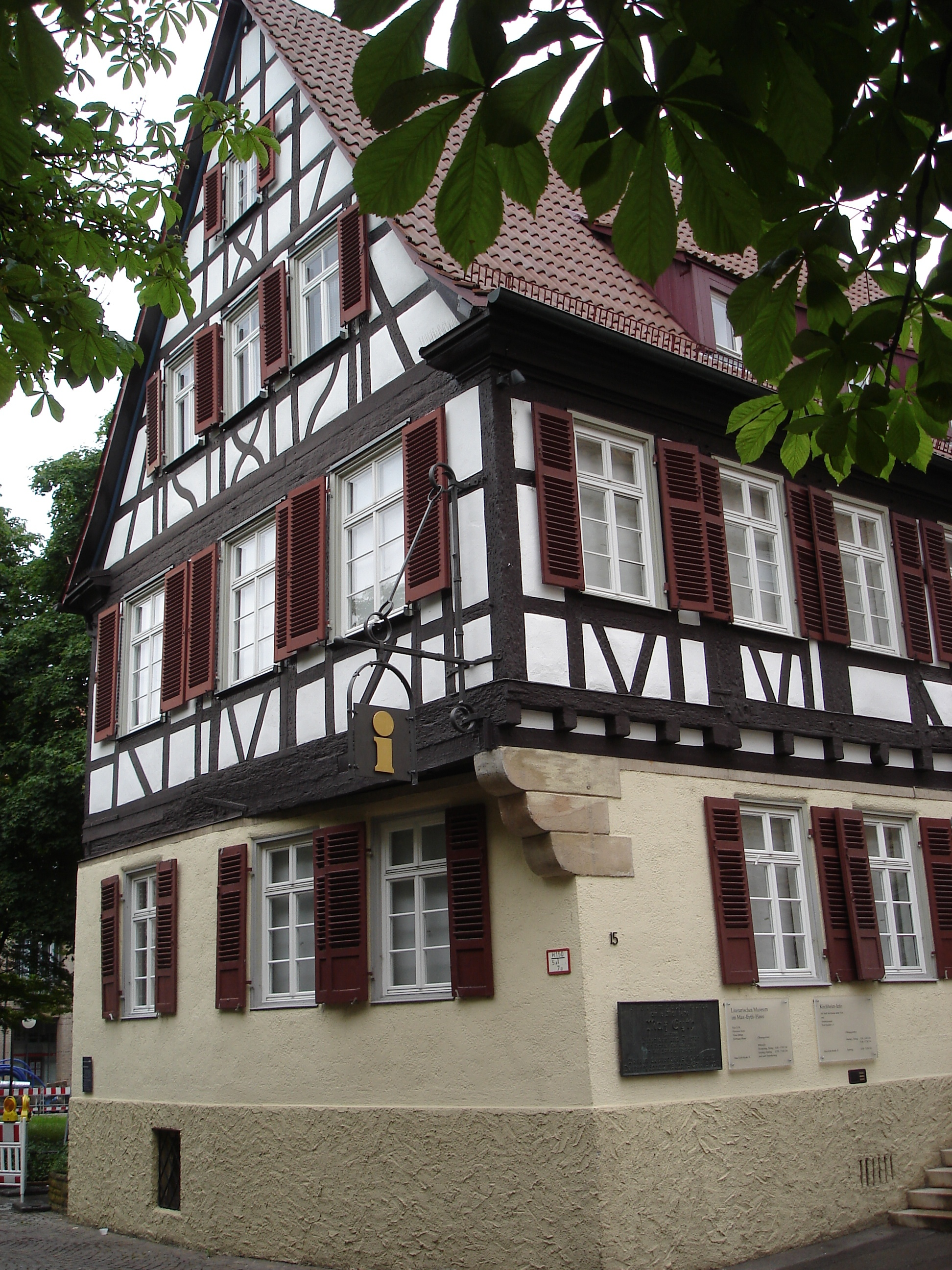
Eyth's birthplace

The house where he was born is now a literature museum (2010).

== Early life and education ==
He was born in Kirchheim unter Teck to Edward Eyth (1809–1884), a teacher of Greek and history at an evangelical seminar and his wife Julie. He lived from 1841 to 1852 in Schöntal Abbey where his father was Ephorus at the Evangelical Seminary Maulbronn and Blaubeuren. Besides his profession, his father wrote books about history and literature history. His mother also was an author.

Young Max spent school time in Heilbronn, and also the first years of his teaching at the Maschinenbau-Gesellschaft Heilbronn Hahn & Göbel.

From 1852 till 1856, he studied at the Polytechnikum Stuttgart Mechanical engineering. Since this time, he was a member of Corps Stauffia Stuttgart. He collected his first experiences at the steam engine factory Gotthilf Kuhn in Berg near Stuttgart. Although he had his degree, he had to absolve a training as mechanist before he was allowed to make constructors work. Before this, he made technical drawings.

== Career ==
In 1862, he went to steam plow factory John Fowler in Leeds and overtook foreign agency for steam plows. There were many travels and stays in foreign countries, for example in Egypt and the United States. During the time of the American Civil War, he travelled to Egypt. Egypt tried at this time to become the main producer of cotton for Europe.

Max Eyth founded the German Agricultural Society (DLG) in 1885.
