= Johann Friedrich Osiander =

German obstetrician (1787–1855)

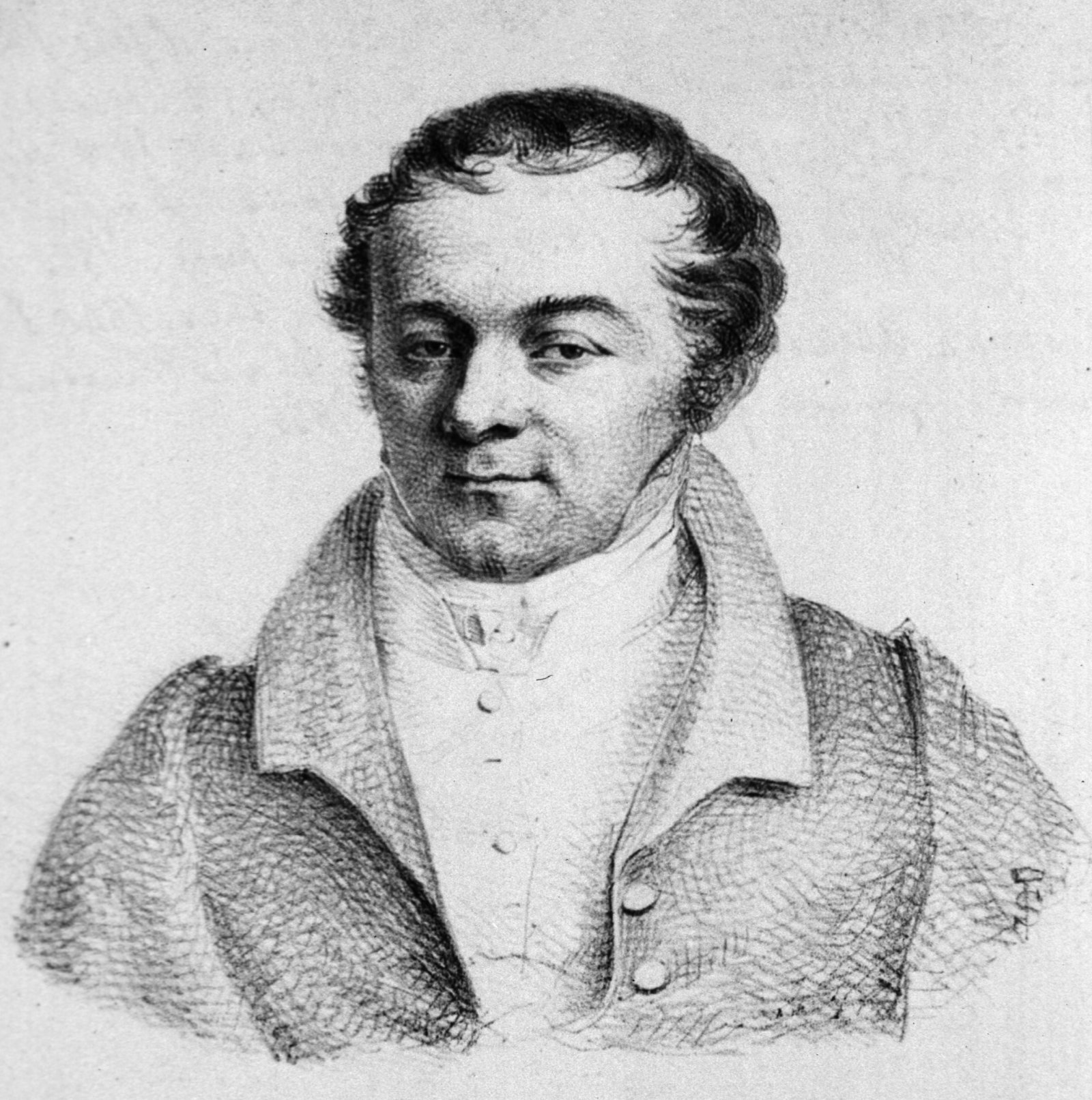
Johann Friedrich Osiander

Johann Friedrich Osiander (2 February 1787 in Kirchheim unter Teck – 10 February 1855) was an obstetrician at Göttingen, who published a prize essay in 1808 on nerves of the uterus titled Commentatio anatomico-physiologica, qua edisseretur uterum nervos habere, noting that he believed that nerves were present in the uterus but could not detect them. He was the son of Friedrich Benjamin Osiander (1759–1822).

In 1808 he received his medical doctorate, and embarked on an educational journey that took him to the University of Tübingen and the University of Paris, where he studied with Jean-Louis Baudelocque (1745–1810). In 1810 he returned to Göttingen, where in worked in the field of urology and was appointed assessor of the Akademie der Wissenschaften zu Göttingen (Göttingen Academy of Sciences).

Under the influence of Johann Friedrich Blumenbach (1752–1840), he developed an interest in natural history and comparative anatomy, and subsequently served as an assistant at the Natural History Cabinet. In 1811 he became a privat-docent at Göttingen, also working as a general practitioner and obstetrician, and in 1815 was appointed an associate professor of medicine. In 1817 he traveled to Vienna, where he met with Johann Lukas Boër (1751–1835); afterwards visiting Berlin, Jena and Halle (Saale).

In 1822 he became his father's representative in Göttingen as director of the maternity hospital. However, following the death of his father, the government preferred Ludwig Julius Caspar Mende (1779–1832) as director of the Göttingen maternity hospital. Therefore, the younger Osiander became a professor of medicine, later taking over the zoological and ethnographic department of the academic museum.

== Works ==
- Volksarzneymittel und einfache, nicht pharmaceutische Heilmittel gegen Krankheiten des Menschen . C. F. Osiander, Tübingen 1826 Digital Edition by the University and State Library Düsseldorf
- Volksarzneymittel und einfache, nicht pharmaceutische Heilmittel gegen Krankheiten des Menschen . C. F. Osiander, Tübingen 3. Aufl. 1838. Digital Edition by the University and State Library Düsseldorf
