= Kirchheim unter Teck =

- Town
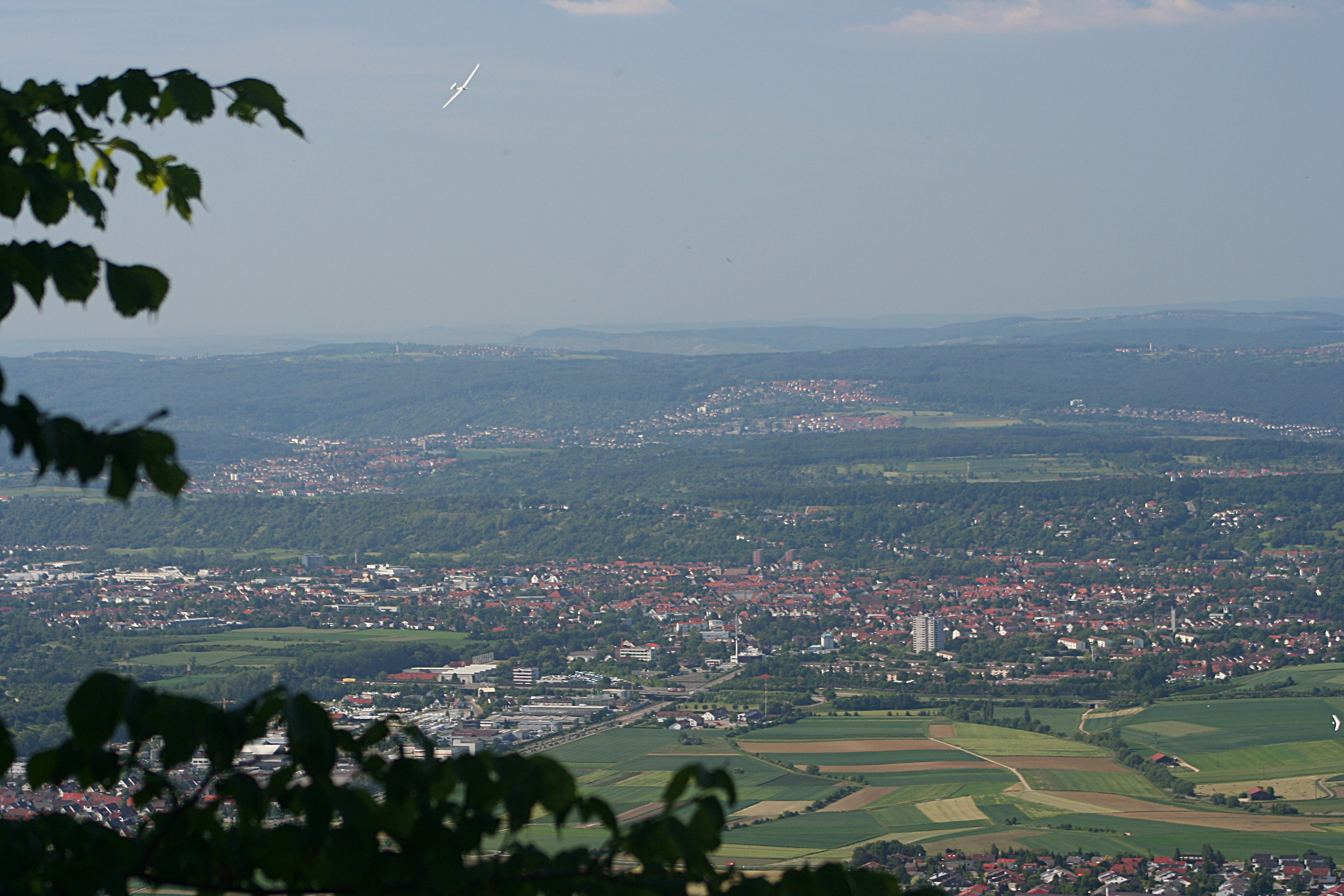

- Coat of arms

- Location of Kirchheim unter Teck within Esslingen district
- Interactive map of Kirchheim unter Teck
- Location within Germany Location within Baden-Württemberg
- Coordinates: 48°38′54″N 9°27′4″E
- Country: Germany
- State: Baden-Württemberg
- Admin. region: Stuttgart
- District: Esslingen
- Subdivisions: 5

Government
  - Mayor (2019–27): Pascal Bader (Ind.)

Area
  - Total: 40.47 km^{2} (15.63 sq mi)
- Elevation: 311 m (1,020 ft)

Population (2025-12-31)
  - Total: 42,382
  - Density: 1,047/km^{2} (2,712/sq mi)
- Time zone: UTC+01:00 (CET)
  - Summer (DST): UTC+02:00 (CEST)
- Postal codes: 73219–73230
- Dialling codes: 07021
- Vehicle registration: ES
- Website: www.kirchheim-teck.de

Kirchheim unter Teck (German pronunciation: [ˈkɪʁçhaɪm ʔʊntɐ ˈtɛk], lit. 'Kirchheim under Teck'; Swabian: Kircha) is a town in Baden-Württemberg, Germany, in the district of Esslingen. It is located on the small river Lauter, a tributary of the Neckar. It is 10 km (6 miles) near the Teck castle, approximately 35 kilometres (22 miles) southeast of Stuttgart. It is the fourth city in the Esslingen district, forming a district centre for the surrounding communities.

Since 1 April 1956, Kirchheim unter Teck has the status of Große Kreisstadt. The city forms a Verwaltungsgemeinschaft (administrative community) with the neighbouring municipalities Dettingen and Notzingen. Kirchheim unter Teck was also, for several centuries, seat of the Oberamt (Oa.) Kirchheim.

== Geography ==
Kirchheim unter Teck is located in the foothills of the central Swabian Alb, north of the Albtrauf escarpment and its foothills: the Teckberg, Breitenstein and Limburg. It is situated in the Lauter valley, at the confluence of the Lindach and several tributary streams with the Lauter. The Lauter itself arrives at the south side of the city, coming from Dettingen unter Teck, then flowing through the city center (to the right of the old town), then turning north west, flowing through the district of Ötlingen and then leaving the city towards Wendlingen am Neckar, where it flows into the Neckar.

== Neighbouring communities ==
The following towns and villages border the town of Kirchheim Teck, clockwise starting in the East: Schlierbach (Göppingen) and Ohmden, Holzmaden, Weilheim an der Teck, Bissingen an der Teck, Dettingen unter Teck, Nürtingen, Oberboihingen, Wendlingen am Neckar, Wernau and Notzingen (all of them in the district of Esslingen)

=== Structure of the city ===
The city of Kirchheim unter Teck consists of the core city Kirchheim, which annexed in 1935 the districts of Lindorf and Ötlingen. In the local government reform of 1974, Kirchheim annexed the districts of Jesingen and Nabern. All four districts are towns in the sense of the Municipal Code of Baden-Württemberg. That is, they each have a municipal council, elected by the population and chaired by a mayor.

Within the central city of Kirchheim, separately named residential areas can be distinguished, whose names have emerged in the course of history. In most cases they are not exactly delineated. The Schafhof district, however, which was built in the 1970s, is not adjacent to the rest of the city.

=== Markets & Attractions ===
The city holds a variety of regular scheduled markets and fairs for its residents and tourists alike. A weekly farmers market offers a wide variety of seasonal fruits, vegetables and fresh flowers amongst other regional specialties. Every first Monday of the month a ‘Krämermarkt’ with roughly 100 additional booths offering clothing, household goods and more is added. Additional seasonal fairs are held in March, November and a Christmasmarket in December.

=== Planning ===
Kirchheim is a regional center within Stuttgart Region, the main center of which is Stuttgart. The Kirchheim region consists of the cities and towns in the southeast of the Esslingen district (essentially the foothills of the Alb with Lenningen valley and Neidlingen valley). In particular, the region encompasses the towns of Bissingen an der Teck, Dettingen unter Teck, Erkenbrechtsweiler, Holzmaden, Köngen, Lenningen, Neidlingen Notzingen, Ohmden, Owen, Weilheim an der Teck and Wendlingen am Neckar.

== History ==
Traces of settlements from the Neolithic, the Celtic and Romans era have been found. Alamannic graves prove the existence of three settlements in the area of the city during the migration period.

Although the first written mention of Kirchheim dates only to the year 960, the town certainly existed during the Alemannic era of the 6th and 7th century. Perhaps the current settlement was founded during the Christianization when several older villages were merged and a church was built and dedicated to St. Martin.

In 960, Kirchheim came in the possession of Emperor Otto I in an exchange for the diocese Chur. The Market and the royal mint date back to the mid-11th Century.

The place was owned by the Dukes of Zähringen and was inherited in 1186 by a lateral line, the Duke of Teck. The Dukes of Teck are known since 1252, but the title of duke more a family name than a proper title. Sometime between 1220 and 1230, they elevated Kirchheim to a market town under Freiburg law. Duke Louis I of Teck founded the Kirchheim nunnery in 1240. In 1270, Duke Conrad II of Teck initiated the construction of a city wall.

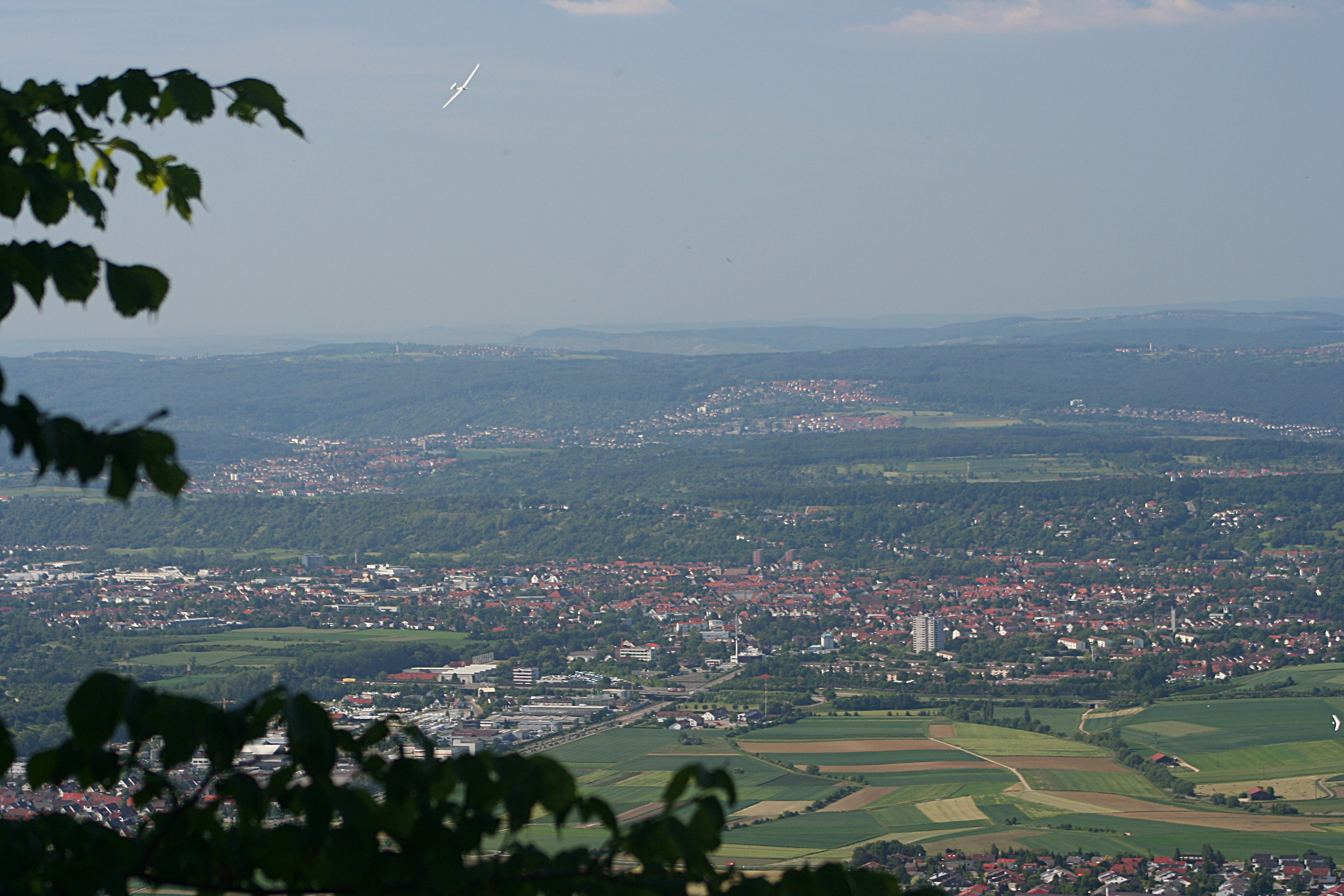
View from the castle of Kirchheim unter Teck; in the foreground Dettingen unter Teck with the district Guckenrain

In a process which lasted from 1303 until 1386, Kirchheim became a part of Austria and later of Württemberg, due to economic difficulties of the Dukes of Teck. The city was the seat of a Württemberg Amt. During the 14th century, when the Dukes of Teck played a leading role in the city government, the rise of the middle classes brought an economic boom, especially in the textile industry and the textile trade.

After Duke Ulrich returned from exile in 1539, Kirchheim was expanded to a fortress of Württemberg and at the same time, the ducal palace was constructed. The current appearance of the city is from the reconstruction after a devastating fire in 1690.

In 1864, it became the terminal of the first private railway in Württemberg, the line Unterboihingen-Kirchheim. In the 19th century, it became the seat of an Oberamt. In 1938, the Oberamt Kirchheim was included in the Landkreis Nürtingen.

After World War II, the population of the city grew significantly due to the influx of refugees and displaced persons. In 1948, the population exceeded the limit of 20,000, and under the Baden-Württemberg Municipal Code, the city received on 1 April 1956 the legal status of Große Kreisstadt.

Since the district reform of 1973, Kirchheim unter Teck is one of the municipalities of the district of Esslingen. In 1974, two neighboring municipalities were annexed. Thus, the city reached its current dimensions.

=== Rocket launch pads ===
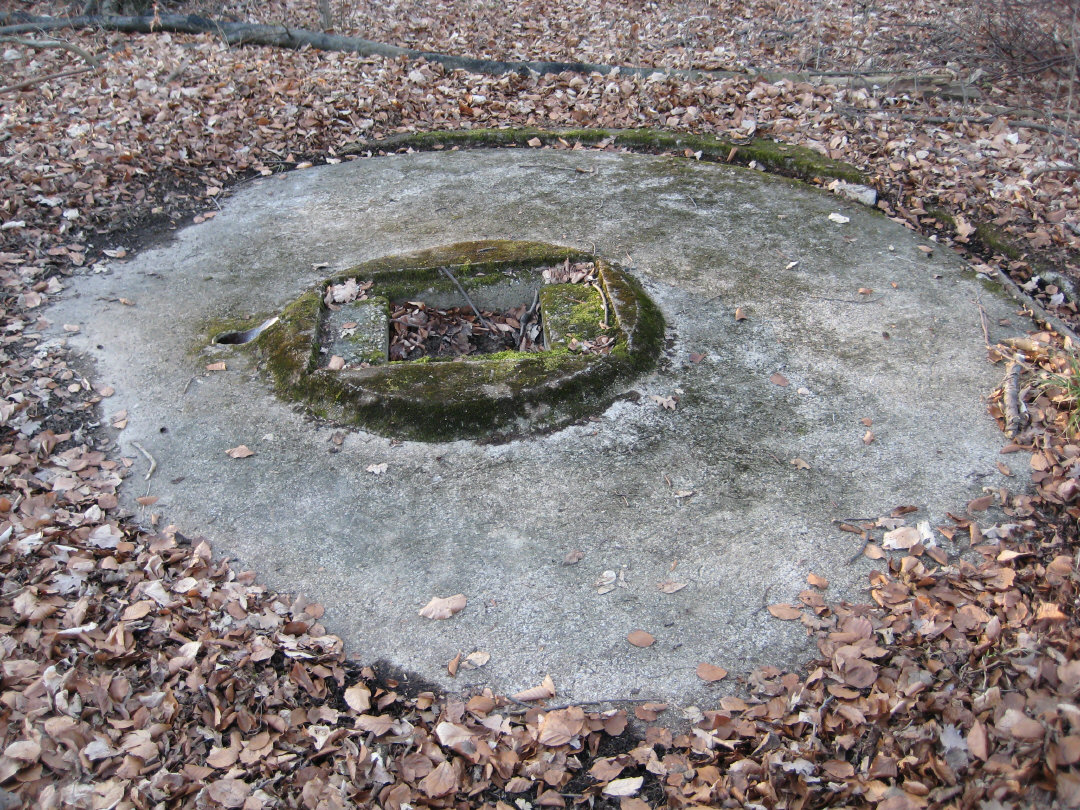
Remnants of a Natter launch pad near Kirchheim

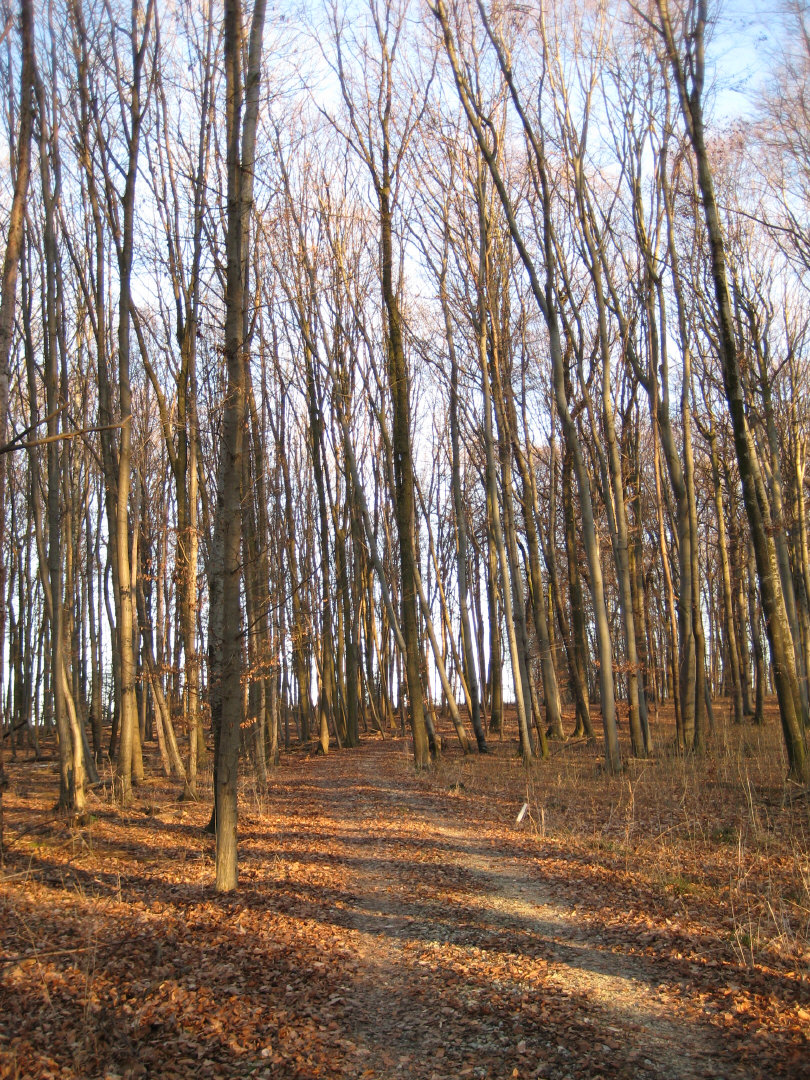
The Hasenholz woods southeast of Kirchheim

There are three launch pads for the Luftwaffe Bachem Ba 349 Natter rocket interceptors located in the Hasenholz forest near Kirchheim unter Teck. They are all that remain from the once active launch site constructed in 1945. The three launchpads are arranged in the form of an equilateral triangle, whose sides point toward the east and the south. The distance between the launchpads is approximately 50 meters. The circular concrete pads on which the Bachem Ba 349s and their launch towers once stood still exist. In the center of each of the three concrete plates is a square hole approximately 50 centimeters deep, which once served as the foundation for the launch tower. Beside each hole is a pipe, cut off at ground level, which was probably once a cable pit.

The Natter launchpads at Kirchheim unter Teck are considered the only remnants of these rocket launch pads on publicly accessible terrain, as the ramp in the Lager Heuberg, where Lothar Sieber took off for his fatal manned test flight, is still in a restricted military area.

=== Religions ===
The population of Kirchheim unter Teck originally belonged to the Bishopric of Constance and was assigned to the Archdeanery circa alpes, chapter Kirchheim. As the city belonged to Württemberg at the time of the Reformation, Protestantism was introduced here as early as 1535 by Duke Ulrich. Consequently, Kirchheim unter Teck was a predominantly Protestant town for centuries. The Martin Church was the seat of the Dean of the Kirchheim Church District.

The congregation grew, especially after the Second World War, due to a strong influx and consequently, the congregation was split. One congregation uses the Christ Church (built in 1909), others use the Church of the Cross (1956), the Thomas Church (1967) and the Resurrection Church (1972). These five congregations in the central city, together with the parish of Ötlingen (separate parish since 1834) and the St. Matthew parish in Lindorf (church built in 1971, formerly part of Kirchheim, later part of Ötlingen), form the Evangelical Church of the City Kirchheim unter Teck. The districts of Jesingen and Nabern were also introduced early to the Reformation, due to their being part of Württemberg as well. Consequently, these district have their own Protestant congregation and church. All Protestant churches in the city are administered by the office of the Dean of Kirchheim unter Teck as part of the Evangelical-Lutheran Church in Württemberg.

Since the late-19th century, there have been Catholics in Kirchheim unter Teck. They built the St. Ulrich church in 1910. Ötlingen and Lindorf and some neighboring communities belong to this parish. In 1967, a second church was built, the Mary Queen of Heaven church. The Catholics in Jessingen and Nabern and some neighboring communities belong to this parish. These two parishes now form the Pastoral Care Unit 5 in the Deanery Esslingen-Nürtingen of the Diocese of Rottenburg-Stuttgart.

The city also has several Free Churches and congregations, including the United Methodist Church and the Evangelical Free Church (also known as Baptists). The New Apostolic Church is also represented in Kirchheim unter Teck.

== Annexations ==
In the town of Kirchheim unter Teck following municipalities were integrated:

- 1 April 1935: Ötlingen and Lindorf
- 1 January 1974: Nabern
- 1 September 1974: Jesingen

=== Districts ===
==== Jesingen ====
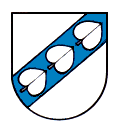
Jesingen

Jesingen is located about two miles (3.2 km) southeast of Kirchheim in the direction Weilheim an der Teck. Jesingen was the first mentioned (as Osinski) in 769 in the Codex of Lorsch in a donation to the Lorsch monastery. The district of Jesingen is 574 ha in size, the village has about 3300 inhabitants.

==== Lindorf ====
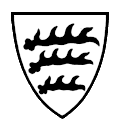
Lindorf

Lindorf is located about two kilometres (1.2 miles) west of Kirchheim. Lindorf is first mentioned in 1090 in the Treaty of Bempflinger Treaty. The district has an area of 262 ha; about 1,500 people live in Lindorf.

==== Ötlingen ====
Ötlingen

Ötlingen is situated approximately 2.5 km (1.55 mi) west of Kirchheim. The two districts are separated by an industrial area; the built up area is now continuous. The Ötlingen district has an area of 375 hectares. Ötlingen is first mentioned in 788 (as Adiningen) in the Codex of Lorsch. Ötlingen was owned by the Dukes of the Zähringen and later by the Dukes of Teck and at end of the 13th century by Württemberg. Today, the district of Ötlingen has approximately 6,400 inhabitants. Ötlingen is the only district of Kirchheim unter Teck with a station on the Stuttgart S-Bahn, apart from Kirchheim itself. Line S1 runs Herrenberg - Böblingen - Stuttgart - Esslingen am Neckar - Plochingen - Wendlingen am Neckar - Kirchheim Teck-Ötlingen - Kirchheim unter Teck . This line provides fast transport to Stuttgart and beyond every 30 minutes.

=== Population development ===
The population figures are estimates, census results (¹) or official updates of the respective statistical offices (only primary residences are counted).

Year	population
1600	2 500
1700	2 101
1763	2 911
1803	3 878
1843	5 372
1861	5 478
1 December 1871	5 863
1 December 1880 ¹	6 632
1 December 1890 ¹	7 029
1 December 1900 ¹	8 235
1 December 1910 ¹	9 668
16 June 1925 ¹	10 057
16 June 1933 ¹	10 664

Year	populations
17 May 1939 ¹	13 260
1946	18 700
13 September 1950 ¹	20 138
6 June 1961 ¹	25 007
27 May 1970 ¹	28 842
31 December 1975	31 666
31 December 1980	32 136
27 May 1987 ¹	33 920
31 December 1990	35 842
31 December 1995	38 205
31 December 2000	38 834
31 December 2005	39 970
31 December 2010	39 859

¹ census results

Source: Statistical Office of Baden-Württemberg

== Politics ==
=== Council ===
Since the last Local Elections in Baden-Württemberg on 25 May 2014, the City Council has 34 members. The turnout was 45,22%. The election result was as follows:

Free Voters	7 seats	(21,45%)
CDU	7 seats	(19,56%)
SPD	7 seats	(19,33%)
Greens	6 seats	(17,24%)
Woman List Kirchheim	3 seats	(10,12%)
FDP / Kirchheimer Civilian List	2 seats	(6,32%)
Christian Initiative Kirchheim	2 seats	(5.98%)

The chairman of the municipal council is the mayor.

=== Mayor ===
In early times, the head of the city Kirchheim unter Teck was called an Amtmann ("bailiff/magistrate"); and later the title was Obervogt ("chief advocate"). Ranked below him were Untervögte (Regents), mayors, a court and a council. The Court was the administrative authority of the city. Since the 14th century, the council considered themselves as representatives of the citizenry. The council still ranked below the court. The council was elected of mayors, usually two of them.

In the 19th century, the mayor held the job title of Stadtschultheiß. From 1930, the term Bürgermeister (mayor) was used, and when the city was promoted to Große Kreisstadt, the job title became Oberbürgermeister (Lord Mayor). He is chairman of the council and is elected directly by the voters for an 8-year term. His deputy is the first Alderman, with the title of "mayor".

==== City leaders since 1819 ====
- 1819–1832: Christian Ludwig Göckler
- 1832–1841: Philipp Gottlieb Osiander
- 1841–1849: Heinrich August Kübel
- 1849–1878: Johan Georg Heim
- 1878–1908: Michael Ernst Kröner
- 1908–1943: Andreas Marx
- 1943–1945: Reinhold Seeber
- 1945: Martin Schempp
- 1945–1975: Franz Kröning
- 1975–1988: Werner Hauser
- 1988–2004: Peter Jacob
- 2004–2020: Angelika Matt-Heidecker
- Since 2020: Pascal Bader

== Economy and transport ==
=== Transport ===
Kirchheim (Teck) station is serviced by the Teck Railway, a railway that connects Wendlingen am Neckar to Lenningen. Inside the city, the bus lines of the public transport group service multiple stops. All of the lines connect to stops serviced by the Verkehrs- und Tarifverbund Stuttgart (VVS), the Stuttgart public transport group.

As of 12 December 2009, the Stuttgart S-Bahn line S1 connects Herrenberg to Kirchheim via Stuttgart Hauptbahnhof, providing links to the city and beyond.

Bundesautobahn 8 passes through the south side of the town and has two interchanges for east- and west-Kirchheim. Bundesstrasse 297 (Lorch - Tübingen) passes through the town, which is also a terminus of Bundesstrasse 465 that leads south through the Lenningen valley on its way to Leutkirch im Allgäu.

=== Local businesses ===
In Kirchheim unter Teck industrialization began early. By 1911 the manufactured goods included cotton goods, damask, pianofortes, machinery, furniture, chemicals, cement and gliders. The town also had wool-spinning establishments and breweries and a corn exchange. It was the most important wool market in South Germany, and also had a trade in fruit, timber and pigs.

Some early companies do not exist any longer, such as the textile company Kolb & Schüle AG, the Schrauben- und Flanschenfabrik Emil Helfferich Nachfolger, the engineering works Kirchheim, the iron foundry Grüninger and Prem, or the MBB armaments factory. Among the better known Kirchheim based companies that still exist, are the seat manufacturer Recaro, the RC model maker Graupner, the cane manufacturer Leki and Schempp-Hirth. The Recaro group filed for bankruptcy protection in July 2024; the Italian Promo Group has bought Recaro and will operate in Italy, taking a few employees and plant equipment to Italy for a start in 2025 per December 2024 news reports.

In the Nabern industrial park we find the company Ballard Power Systems, a company that developed fuel cells and is owned by Daimler AG.

=== Media ===
The Teckbote is a daily newspaper published in Kirchheim unter Teck. It is a regional edition of the Südwest Presse.

=== Authorities, courts and organisations ===
Kirchheim unter Teck has a field office of the Tax Office Nürtingen, a branch of the District Office Esslingen, a Notary and a District Court that belongs to the Oberlandesgericht district of Stuttgart.

The city is also home to the church district of Kirchheim unter Teck of the Evangelical-Lutheran Church in Württemberg.

Of health facilities, the city has a district hospital of the district of Esslingen. In addition, there are several sports and leisure facilities including, outdoor pool, 11 sports and event halls, a skate park, a riding stable, and 10 stadiums and sports grounds.

== Education ==
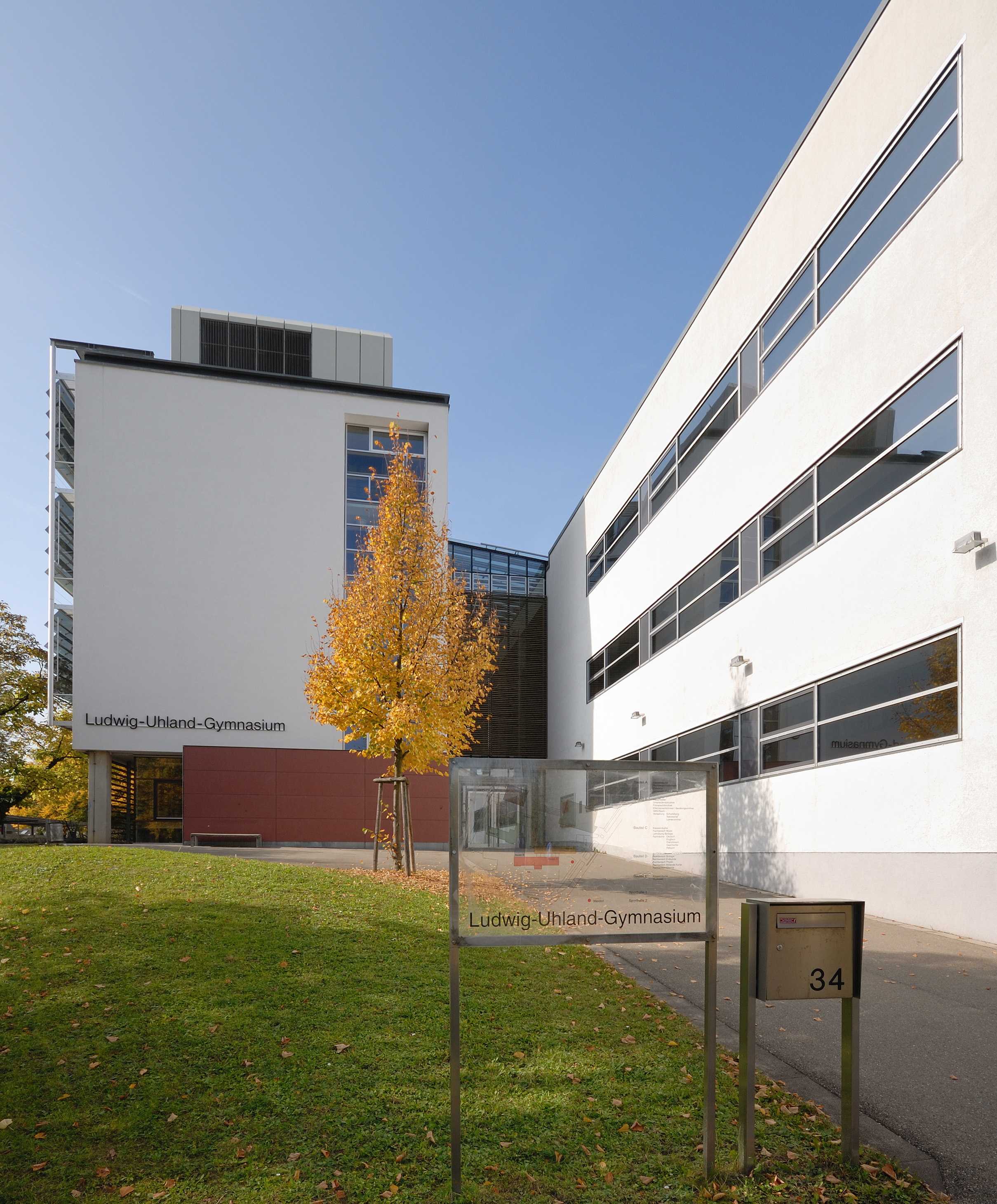
The Ludwig-Uhland-Gymnasium

In Kirchheim unter Teck there are a Pedagogical Seminar (teacher training) and a large number of primary and secondary schools.

The district of Esslingen is the education authority for the vocational schools: Jakob-Friedrich-Schöllkopf School - Business School and Max-Eyth School - Commercial School, and for the Carl-Weber-school kindergarten for the mentally handicapped.

The Community College Kirchheim unter Teck eV (founded in 1947), provides a wide range of courses. DEULA provides agricultural technical training. There is a traffic-educational college (VPA), which provides training for driving instructors.

For smaller children there are 49 kindergarten classes with 1328 seats, 5 groups in day-care centers with 85-88 seats, 5 groups in church nursery with 75-81 seats and 5 groups in free kindergartens with 119 seats.

=== School exchanges ===
One of the main high schools in Kirchheim unter Teck, the Ludwig-Uhland-Gymnasium, has been running an exchange with students from Upholland High School, Orrell, United Kingdom, since 1995. This exchange is for all students in each school who are musically talented and who are in the school band in both schools. Students from each school take place in the exchange in different years – Ludwig Big Band in 1996, 98, 00, 02 etc., and UHHS Band in 1995, 97, 99, 01 etc. This year (2009) sees 35 students from the UHHS band visit the school and the town of Kirchheim, this year will also commemorate the twenty-fifth year of exchanges.

== Twin towns – sister cities ==
Kirchheim unter Teck is twinned with:

- Rambouillet, France (1967)
- Kalocsa, Hungary (1997)
- Bački Petrovac, Serbia (2017)

== Notable people ==
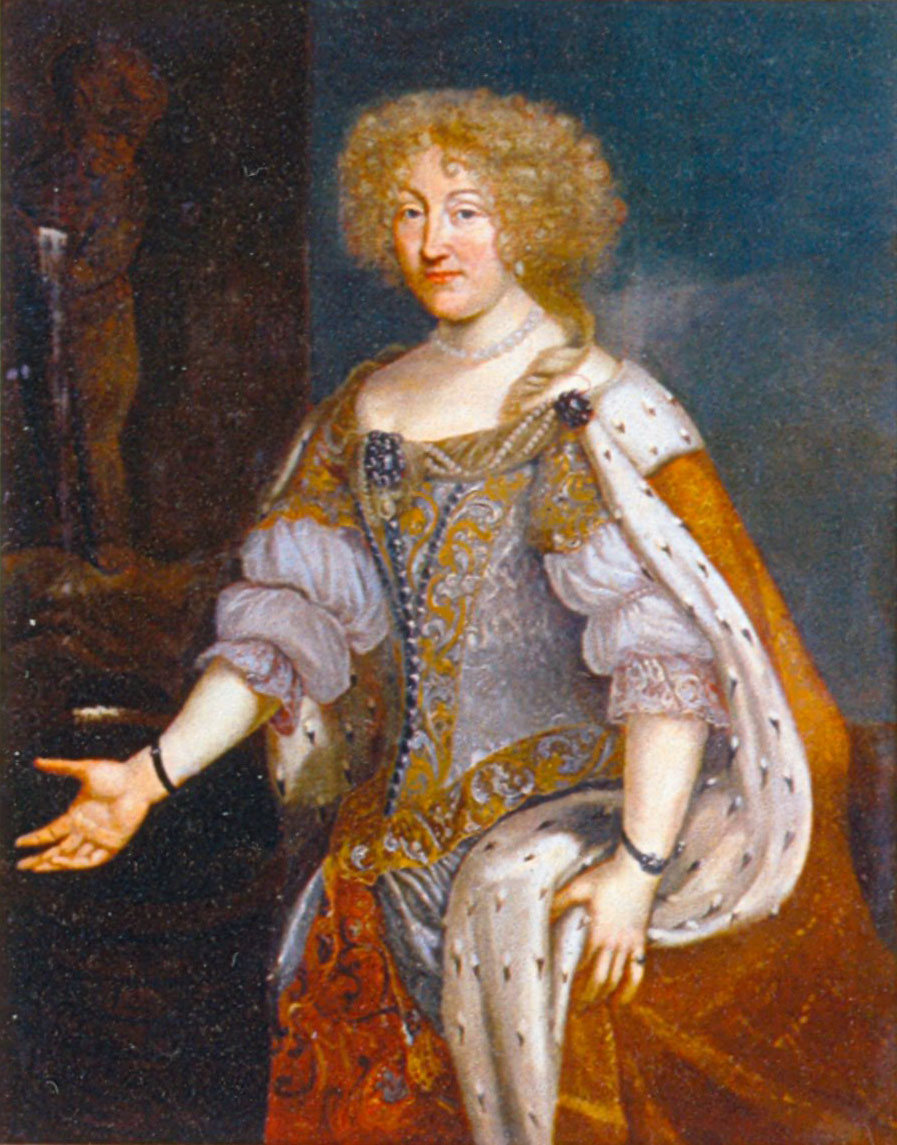
Magdalena Sibylla in 1675

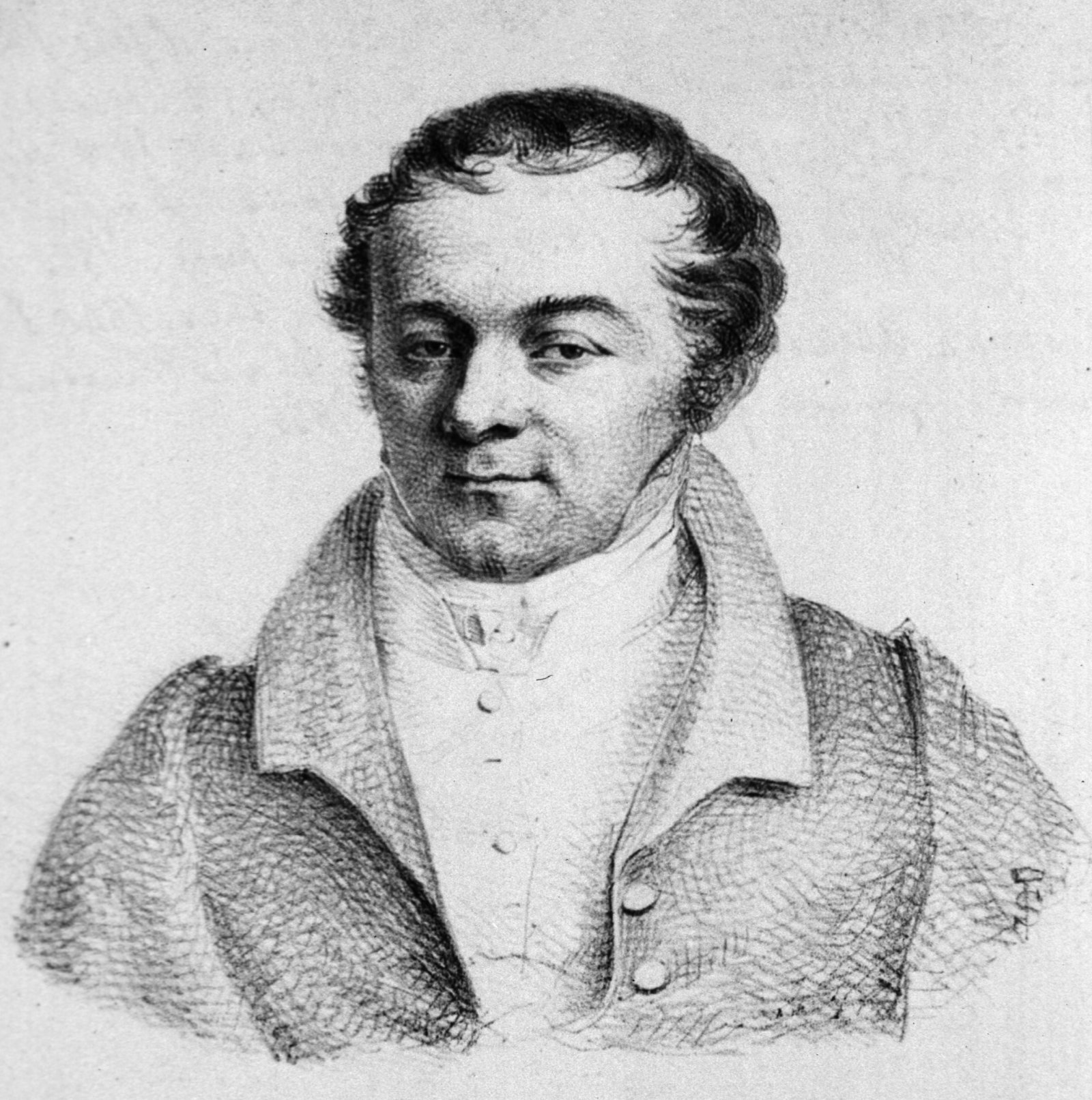
Johann Friedrich Osiander

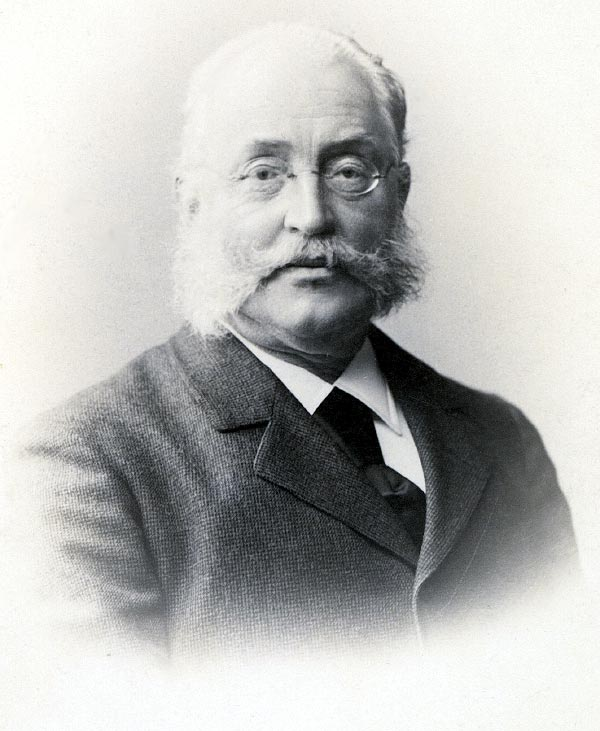
Max Eyth in 1892

- Rupertus Meldenius (1582–1651), theologian and educator. local deacon
- Barbara Sophie of Brandenburg (1584–1636), duchess, lived in Schloss Kirchheim
- Magdalena Sibylla of Hesse-Darmstadt (1652–1712), composer of church music, died in Schloss Kirchheim
- Joanna Elisabeth of Baden-Durlach (1680–1757), Duchess of Württemberg, lived at Schloss Kirchheim
- Christiane Charlotte of Württemberg-Winnental (1694–1729), princess, born locally
- Countess Franziska von Hohenheim (1748–1811), noblewoman, died locally, the "Good Angel of Württemberg"
- Duke Louis of Württemberg (1756–1817), Prussian field marshal, died locally
- Adolph Carl August von Eschenmayer (1768–1852), philosopher and physician, worked locally from 1836.
- Princess Henriette of Nassau-Weilburg (1780–1857), a duchess, died locally.
- Baron von Ludwig (1784–1847), pharmacist, served his pharmacy apprenticeship locally
- Johann Friedrich Osiander (1787–1855), obstretician, born locally
- Jacob F. Schoellkopf (1819–1899), emigrated aged 22, harnessed the hydroelectric power of Niagara Falls.
- Frederick Vogel (1823–1892), tanner in Milwaukee, Wisconsin, born locally
- Gottlieb Heileman (1824–1878), founder of the G. Heileman Brewing Company in Wisconsin
- Max Eyth (1836–1906), engineer and writer, born locally
- Rudolf von Bünau (1890–1962), general, died locally
- Martin Schempp (1905–1984), glider pilot, founded Schempp-Hirth, died locally
- Eugen Gerstenmaier (1906–1986), resistance fighter and CDU politician
- Kurt Rommel (1926–2011), German Protestant pastor, author and hymnodist, born locally
- Bjørn Melhus (born 1966), artist & short film maker, born locally
- Natalie Pfau-Weller (born 1987), German politician (CDU)

=== Sport ===
- Óscar Barrena (born 1966), field hockey player, born locally
- Brothers Lado Fumic (born 1976) and Manuel Fumic (born 1982), cross-country mountain bikers, born locally
- Jasmina Keber (born 1988), crossminton (speed badminton) player

== Literature ==
- Frasch, Werner: Kirchheim unter Teck – aus Geschichte und Gegenwart einer Stadt und ihrer Bewohner Verlag der Teckbote, Kirchheim unter Teck 1985, ISBN 3-925589-00-7.
- Kirchheim unter Teck - Marktort/Amtsstadt/Mittelalterzentrum. Hrsg. von Rainer Kilian i. A. der Stadt Kirchheim (Teck), GO Druck Media Verlag, Kirchheim unter Teck 2006, ISBN 978-3-925589-38-6.
- Der Landkreis Esslingen. Hrsg. vom Landesarchiv Baden-Württemberg i. V. mit dem Landkreis Esslingen, Jan Thorbecke Verlag, Ostfildern 2009, ISBN 978-3-7995-0842-1, Band 2, Seite 45.
- Kirchheim unter Teck um 1000 n. Chr. - Geschichte und Archäologie. - Hrsg. Regierungspräsidium Stuttgart - Landesamt für Denkmalpflege Esslingen, Archäologische Informationen aus Baden-Württemberg Heft 62, Stuttgart: Verlagsbüro Wais und Partner, 2011, ISBN 978-3-942227-03-2.
- Deigendesch, Roland: Mit Tina und Mehmet Kirchheim unter Teck entdecken – Stadtgeschichte(n) für Kinder. Hrsg. von der AG Museumspädagogik in Verbindung mit dem Stadtarchiv Kirchheim unter Teck. GO Druck Media, Kirchheim unter Teck 2011, ISBN 978-3-925589-56-0.

Attribution:
