= Wernau =

- Town
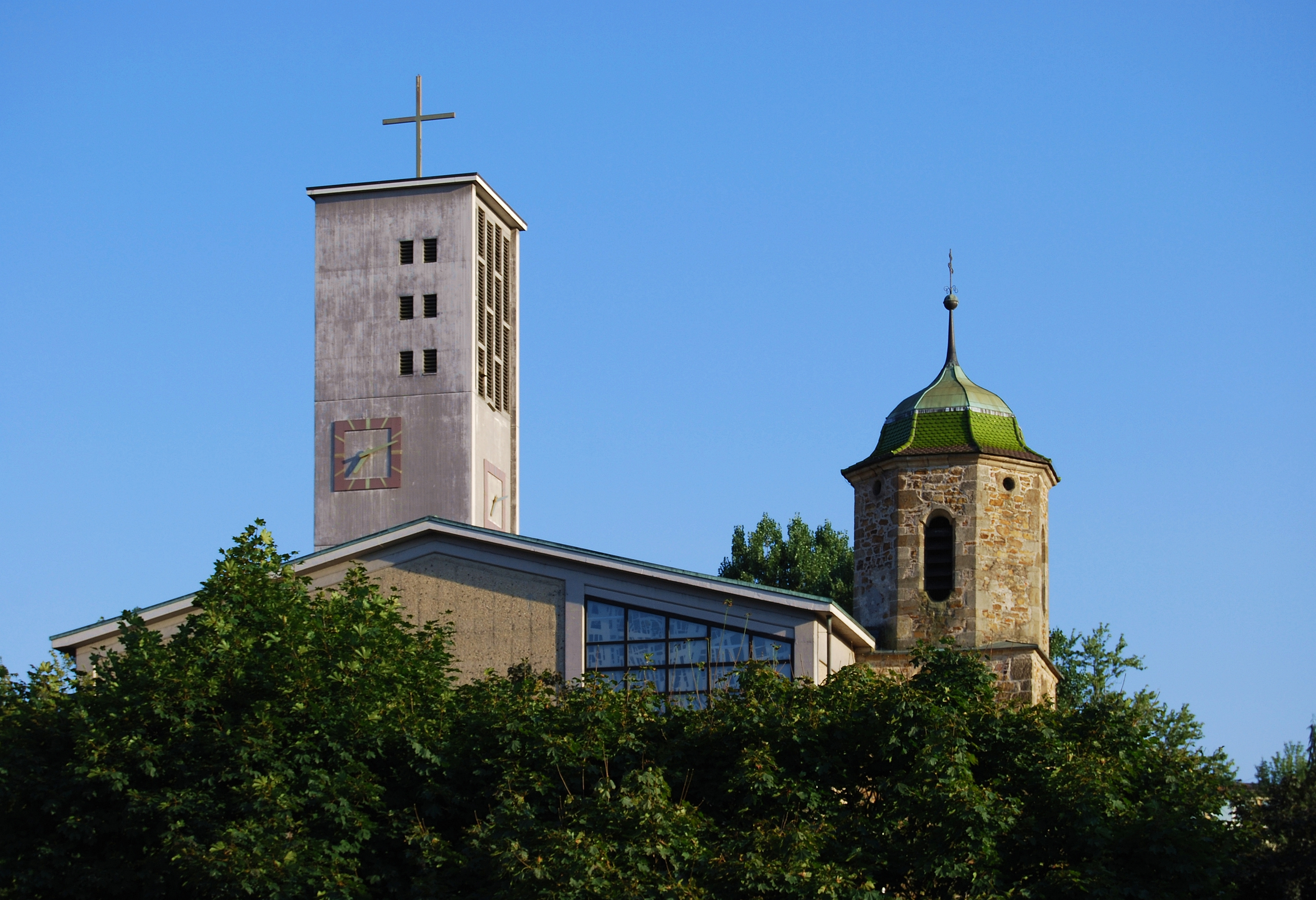
- Saint Erasmus Church

- Coat of arms

- Location of Wernau within Esslingen district
- Interactive map of Wernau
- Location within Germany Location within Baden-Württemberg
- Coordinates: 48°41′19″N 9°25′20″E
- Country: Germany
- State: Baden-Württemberg
- Admin. region: Stuttgart
- District: Esslingen
- Subdivisions: 2

Government
  - Mayor (2023–31): Christiane Krieger

Area
  - Total: 10.89 km^{2} (4.20 sq mi)
- Elevation: 255 m (837 ft)

Population (2025-12-31)
  - Total: 12,210
  - Density: 1,121/km^{2} (2,904/sq mi)
- Time zone: UTC+01:00 (CET)
  - Summer (DST): UTC+02:00 (CEST)
- Postal codes: 73249
- Dialling codes: 07153
- Vehicle registration: ES
- Website: www.wernau.de

Wernau (German pronunciation: [ˈvɛʁnaʊ]; Swabian: Wärnao) is a town in the district of Esslingen in Baden-Württemberg southwestern Germany. It is situated on the Neckar river, 25 km southeast of Stuttgart.

== Geography ==
=== Location ===
Wernau is located on the southeast bank of the Neckar river, south of Plochingen and about 25 km east of Stuttgart. The Bodenbach river flows through the city. In 1981 the Wernau Baggerseen (quarry ponds) were declared a wildlife preserve. Today it spans across 45 hectares. Another 5.5 hectares of wildlife preserve are located in an area of the city called the Wernau Lehmgrube (clay pits).

The small community of "Freitagshof," which lies to the South, also belongs to Wernau.

=== Neighboring Communities ===
Neighboring Wernau are the communities of Deizisau to the Northwest, Plochingen to the North, Hochdorf to the East and Notzingen to the Southeast; the cities of Kirchheim unter Teck to the South and Wendlingen to the Southwest and the community of Köngen to the West. All of them are located within and belong to the district of Esslingen am Neckar.

=== Land Use Distribution ===
Dark green: Forest 22.5%, Yellow: Agriculture 40.9%, Blue: Water surface 3.0%, Lighter green: Recreational areas 3.3%, Red: Buildings and open areas 16.0%, Beige: Transportation surfaces 10.2%, Purple: Other

According to data from the Statistischen Landesamtes, as of 2014.

== History ==
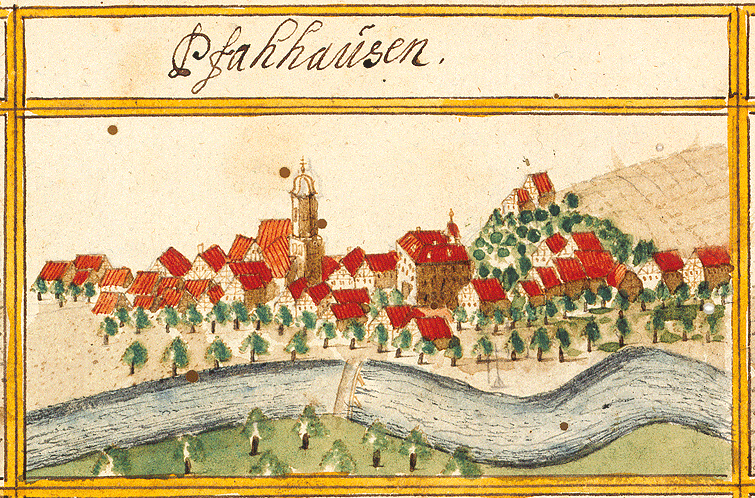
Pfauhausen 1683, Forstlagerbuch by Andreas Kieser

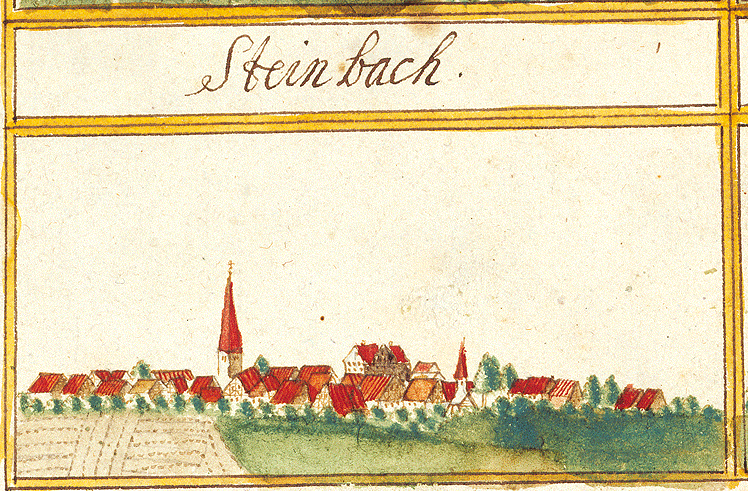
Steinbach 1683, Forstlagerbuch by Andreas Kieser

Wernau was established in 1938 by the joining of the two communities Pfauhausen and Steinbach. These communities tried to unite in 1384 and again in 1681. While the first attempt lasted a few decades, the 1681 union by Franz Josef von Wernau did not last seven years.

=== Up until Wernau's establishment ===
In 1384 and again in 1681 an attempt was made to establish a community out of Pfauhausen and Steinbach, but these attempts failed after a short period of time. Up until 1769 Pfauhausen belonged to the sovereignty of Neuhausen from Anterior Austria. It then belonged to the Prince-Bishopric of Speyer up to 1802 and was therefore a catholic community. Steinbach also remained catholic through the Protestant Reformation under the sovereignty of the Speth von Sulzburg. This made both communities an enclave of the Catholics in the predominately Protestant land of Württemberg. Pfauhausen and Steinbach were assigned to Oberamt Esslingen in 1808 as part of the implementation of the District Reformation of Württemberg in the Kingdom of Württemberg. During NAZI-Germany both communities were fused together to form Wernau in 1938 and were assigned, as part of the NAZI District Reformation, to Esslingen.

=== After WWII until Present ===
After World War II Wernau became a part of the American Zone of Occupation in the German state of Württemberg-Baden which was later reformed into the current German state of Baden-Württemberg in 1952. After WWII many refugees from Hungary moved to Wernau. On 1 April 1968 Wernau received its charter as an official city.

=== Demographics ===
Year	Population
1871	1,259
1880	1,298
1890	1,388
1900	1,407
1910	1,857
1925	2,241
1933	2,312

Year	Population
1939	2,814
1950	4,325
1961	9,339
1970	12,552
1975	12,699
1980	12,147
1985	11,763

Year	Population
1990	11,829
1995	11,917
2000	12,459
2005	12,388
2010	12,383
2015	12,376

== Economy an Infrastructure ==
Wernau is an attractive economic location. Famous companies like Bosch-Thermotechnik; the Japanese company Mori Seiki; the manufacturer of electrical component systems, 2E mechatronic; and the producer of folk costumes, Perry have settled here. Handcraft companies and wholesale businesses have also found a home in the city.

A Convention Center is located in the "Quadrium" with an indoor pool and spa. Wernau also has a public outdoor pool and an ice rink.

A public library was opened in 1971. As of 1996 it is located in a building right across from the train station. It houses 24,000 books and other printed and electronic media and in 2012 loaned out 90,000 items.

=== Transportation ===
Wernau is connected by the Plochingen-Tübingen railway (Neckar-Alb-Bahn) to the national rail network. Since 12 December 2009 Wernau is a stop on S1 line of the S-Bahn Stuttgart. The S1 line ends in Kirchheim unter Teck. Wernau is connected by the B 313 to the Bundesautobahn 8 and to the Bundesstraße 10, that leads to Stuttgart.

=== Companies based in Wernau ===
- DEWETRON Elektronische Messgeräte GmbH
- Eurotubes Thomas Klein Präzisionsdrahtführer und Löttechnik
- Junkers Gasgeräte (Bosch Gruppe) / BBT Thermotechnik
- Krüger Dirndl GmbH, manufacturer of high-end traditional garments for men and women
- Prakesch Zerspanungstechnik GmbH, precision machined automotive and other parts,
- Steinpilz GmbH Softwareentwicklung
- DMG Mori AG manufacturer of cutting machine tools (DMG Mori AG)

== Arts and culture ==
- Maria-Hilf-Kapelle (Maria Help Chapel) from 1667, is the oldest building in Wernau
- The castle from the Baron von Palm (18th century)
- Castle of the lords of Wernau
- Old church tower of St. Erasmus with its Roman elements
- Stadtbücherei am Bahnhofsplatz (public library)
- Theater

== Parks and outdoor recreation ==
- Nature conservation area Wernau Quarry Ponds, bird paradise
- Natural conservation area Wernau Clay Pit
- Forest teaching path

== Government ==
=== Town Council ===
The Town Council has 22 seats. The Council Elections on 26 May 2019 reported the following preliminary results. The Town Council consist of elected officials (unpaid posts) and the Mayor as head of the government. The Mayor has voting power in the town council.

Parties		% 2019	Seats; 2019	% 2014	Seats; 2014
WBL/JB	Wernau Citizen List/Young Citizens	30.97	7	26.63	6
FWV	Independent Voters of Wernau	22.67	5	23.90	5
CDU	Christian Democratic Union	19.11	4	24.20	6
SPD	Social Democratic Party	13.63	3	14.61	3
GRÜNE	Green/Independents	13.63	3	10.66	2
Total		100.0	22	100.0	22
Voter turnout		59.38 %		49.00 %	

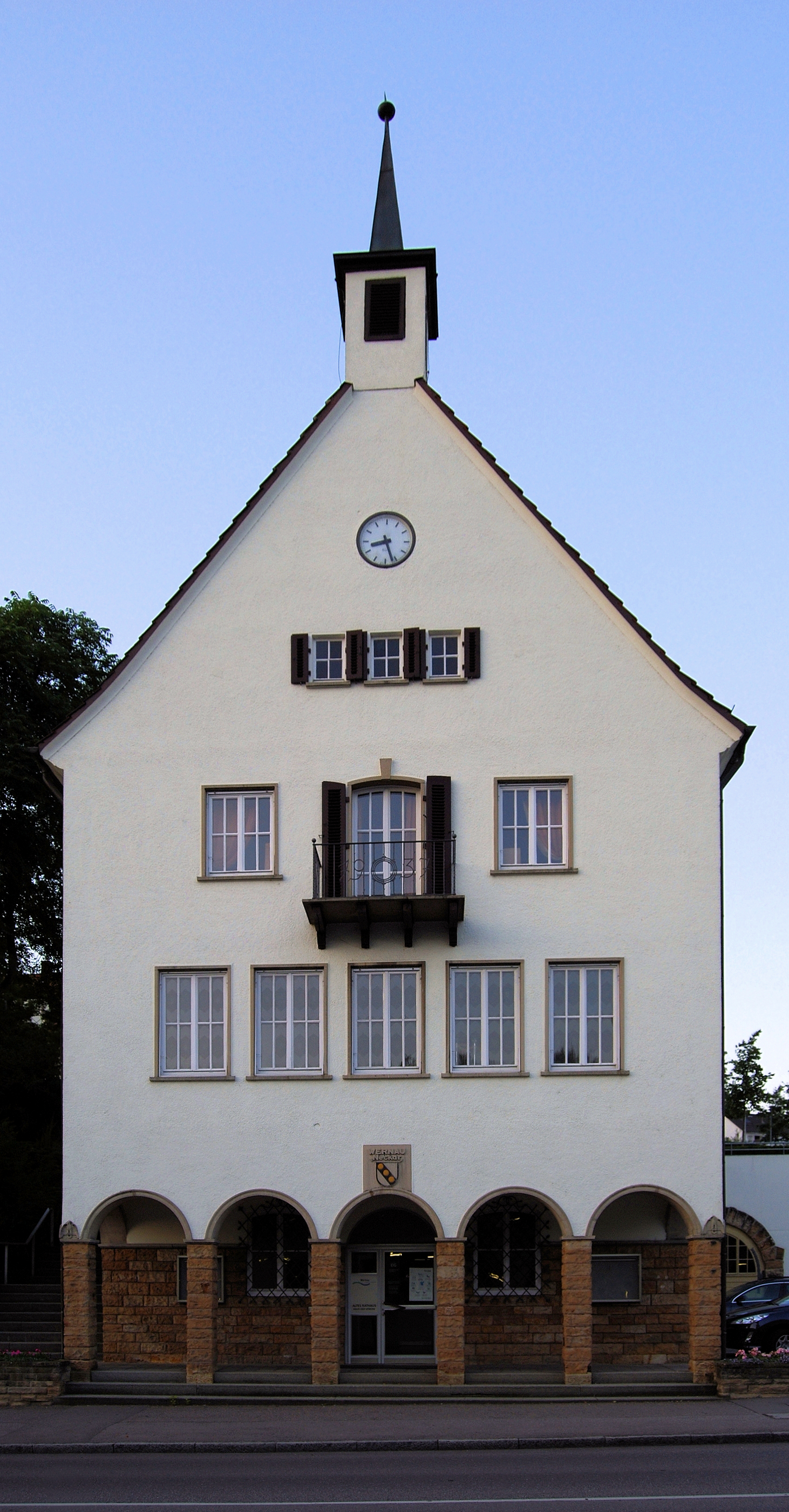
Altes Rathaus Wernau 2010

Old town hall of Wernau (photo at right)

=== Mayor ===
- 1945–1964 Friedrich Schönherr
- 1964–1984 Hans Wagner
- 1984–2007 Roger Kehle
- 2007–2023 Armin Elbl
- since 2023 Christiane Krieger

On 8 October 2023 Christiane Krieger was elected with 70.13% of the votes.

=== Coat of arms ===
Blazon: "In silver, a black diagonal stripe with three golden balls."

The coat of arms stems from the Herren von Wernau (Lord of Wernau), whose name is also the origin of the city's name. The three balls symbolize the legend of Nicolaus, according to which, the Bishop of Nikolaus from Myra threw three bags of gold through the window of a house where three poor girls lived, so that they could pay for their weddings.

== Notable people from Wernau ==
- Julius Denzel (1852–1915), German chemist
- Max Hesse (born 2001), German racecar driver

== Bibliography ==
- Baumann, Michael: Wernau am Neckar, 1938–1988 aus der Reihe Archivbilder, Sutton Verlag, Erfurt 2010, ISBN 978-3-86680-648-1.
- Ferdinand Schaller: Pfauhausen und Steinbach: Wernau am Neckar in alten Tagen. Sutton Verlag, Erfurt 2009, ISBN 978-3-86680-344-2.
- Der Landkreis Esslingen – hrsg. vom Landesarchiv Baden-Württemberg i. V. mit dem Landkreis Esslingen, Jan Thorbecke Verlag, Ostfildern 2009, Band 2, Seite 477, ISBN 978-3-7995-0842-1.
- Anton Denzinger, Diether Hauber: Wernau: 700 Jahre Pfauhausen und Steinbach 1276–1976. Gottlieb & Osswald, Kirchheim 1976.

Wernau is twinned with:

- Bonyhád, Hungary
