= Hochdorf =

Hochdorf may refer to

- Hochdorf, Lucerne, a municipality in Switzerland
- Hochdorf (district), a district (Amt) in the Canton of Lucerne, Switzerland
- Hochdorf, Esslingen, a municipality in the district of Esslingen, Baden-Württemberg, Germany
- Hochdorf, Biberach, a municipality in the district of Biberach, Baden-Württemberg, Germany
- Hochdorf an der Enz, a part of the town of Eberdingen (Baden-Württemberg, Germany)
- Hochdorf, Nagold, a part of the town of Nagold, Baden-Württemberg, Germany
- The Celtic Hochdorf Chieftain's Grave, in Hochdorf an der Enz
- Hochdorf, Lower Silesia, a former German municipality that passed under Polish sovereignty in 1945; until that date Guido Henckel von Donnersmarck and his son, Guido Otto, had an estate here.
- Hochdorf, Rhein-Pfalz-Kreis, a German village that was merged with Assenheim to form Hochdorf-Assenheim.
