= Oberboihingen =

- Municipality
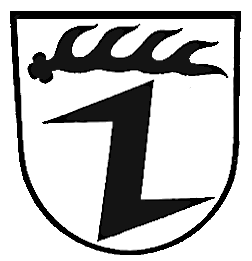
- Coat of arms

- Location of Oberboihingen within Esslingen district
- Interactive map of Oberboihingen
- Location within Germany Location within Baden-Württemberg
- Coordinates: 48°38′49″N 9°22′0″E
- Country: Germany
- State: Baden-Württemberg
- Admin. region: Stuttgart
- District: Esslingen

Government
  - Mayor (2023–31): Ulrich Peter Spangenberg

Area
  - Total: 6.31 km^{2} (2.44 sq mi)
- Elevation: 276 m (906 ft)

Population (2025-12-31)
  - Total: 5,610
  - Density: 889/km^{2} (2,300/sq mi)
- Time zone: UTC+01:00 (CET)
  - Summer (DST): UTC+02:00 (CEST)
- Postal codes: 72644
- Dialling codes: 07022
- Vehicle registration: ES
- Website: www.oberboihingen.de

Oberboihingen (Swabian: Bõẽnga) is a municipality in the district of Esslingen in Baden-Württemberg in southern Germany.

== Geography ==
It is located 20 km southeast of Stuttgart on the railway line between Stuttgart and Tübingen.

== Demographics ==
Population development:

Year	Inhabitants
1990	4,765
2001	5,481
2011	5,328
2021	5,616

== Curiosities ==
At the station, there was the last hand-operated level crossing in Baden-Württemberg.
