= Schlierbach (Göppingen) =

German municipality

- Municipality
- Coat of arms

- Location of Schlierbach within Göppingen district
- Interactive map of Schlierbach
- Location within Germany Location within Baden-Württemberg
- Coordinates: 48°40′26″N 9°31′5″E
- Country: Germany
- State: Baden-Württemberg
- Admin. region: Stuttgart
- District: Göppingen

Area
  - Total: 10.97 km^{2} (4.24 sq mi)
- Elevation: 355 m (1,165 ft)

Population (2025-12-31)
  - Total: 3,876
  - Density: 353.3/km^{2} (915.1/sq mi)
- Time zone: UTC+01:00 (CET)
  - Summer (DST): UTC+02:00 (CEST)
- Postal codes: 73278
- Dialling codes: 07021
- Vehicle registration: GP
- Website: www.schlierbach.de

Schlierbach is a municipality in the district of Göppingen in Baden-Württemberg, Germany.

== History ==
Schlierbach was a possession of the Duchy of Teck, whose territories were inherited by the County of Württemberg in 1381. Schlierbach fully came under Württemberg's control in 1439 with the purchase of all rights over the township. From 1485 on, it was assigned to the administrative district of Göppingen. Schlierbach grew substantially after World War II, especially by the end of the 1960s.

== Geography ==
The municipality (Gemeinde) of Schlierbach lies at the western edge of the district of Göppingen, along its border with the district of Esslingen am Neckar. Schlierbach is physically located on the Schlierbach Plateau, in the central foothills of the Swabian Jura. Elevation above sea level in the municipal area ranges from a high of 395 meters (1,296 ft) Normalnull (NN) to a low of 312 meters (1,024 ft) NN.

== Politics ==
Schlierbach was a single borough, Schlierbach. There two abandoned villages located in its municipal area: Bolzhausen and Brühlmannshof. Schlierbach is in a mutually-beneficial municipal association with the city of Eislingen.

=== Coat of arms ===
Schlierbach's coat of arms displays a field of blue crossed by two yellow, wavy lines. At the top of the blazon is a yellow chief containing a stag antler, in black. The yellow lines are references to a local stream, the Schlierbach, and its tributaries, while the stag antler is a reference to Württemberg. This coat of arms was first awarded to Schlierbach by the post-World War II provisional Württemberg-Baden government on 21 January 1948 and was reapproved, and a municipal flag issued, by the Federal Ministry of the Interior on 18 December 1958.

== Transportation ==
Schlierbach is connected to Germany's network of roadways by Bundesstraße 297. Local public transportation is provided by the Filsland Mobilitätsverbundes.
