= Pforzheim (electoral district) =

Federal electoral district of Germany

279 Pforzheim
- Electoral district for the Bundestag
- Pforzheim in 2025
- State: Baden-Württemberg
- Population: 325,500 (2019)
- Electorate: 217,126 (2021)
- Major settlements: Pforzheim; Mühlacker
- Area: 671.6 km^{2}

Current electoral district
- Created: 1965
- Party: CDU
- Member: Gunther Krichbaum
- Elected: 2002, 2005, 2009, 2013, 2017, 2021, 2025

Pforzheim is an electoral constituency (German: Wahlkreis) represented in the Bundestag. It elects one member via first-past-the-post voting. Under the current constituency numbering system, it is designated as constituency 279. It is located in northwestern Baden-Württemberg, comprising the city of Pforzheim and the district of Enzkreis.

Pforzheim was created for the 1965 federal election. Since 2002, it has been represented by Gunther Krichbaum of the Christian Democratic Union (CDU).

== Geography ==
Pforzheim is located in northwestern Baden-Württemberg. As of the 2021 federal election, it comprises the independent city of Pforzheim and the district of Enzkreis.

== History ==
Pforzheim was created in 1965, then known as Pforzheim – Karlsruhe-Land I. It acquired its current name in the 1980 election. In the 1965 through 1976 elections, it was constituency 182 in the numbering system. In the 1980 through 1998 elections, it was number 183. In the 2002 and 2005 elections, it was number 280. Since the 2009 election, it has been number 279. Originally, the constituency comprised the independent city of Pforzheim, the Landkreis Pforzheim district, and the municipalities of Auerbach, Bruchhausen, Burbach, Busenbach, Ettlingen, Ettlingenweier, Etzenrot, Forchheim, Grünwettersbach, Hohenwettersbach, Langensteinbach, Malsch, Mörsch, Mutschelbach, Neuburgweier, Oberweier, Palmbach, Pfaffenrot, Reichenbach, Schielberg, Schluttenbach, Schöllbronn, Spessart, Spielberg, Stupferich, Sulzbach, Völkersbach, Malsch, and Wolfartsweier from the Landkreis Karlsruhe district. In the 1980 through 1998 elections, it comprised the city of Pforzheim, the Enzkreis district, and the municipality of Oberderdingen from the Landkreis Karlsruhe district. It acquired its current borders in the 2002 election.

Election	No.	Name	Borders
1965	182	Pforzheim – Karlsruhe-Land I	Pforzheim city; Landkreis Pforzheim district; Landkreis Karlsruhe district (only Auerbach, Bruchhausen, Burbach, Busenbach, Ettlingen, Ettlingenweier, Etzenrot, Forchheim, Grünwettersbach, Hohenwettersbach, Langensteinbach, Malsch, Mörsch, Mutschelbach, Neuburgweier, Oberweier, Palmbach, Pfaffenrot, Reichenbach, Schielberg, Schluttenbach, Schöllbronn, Spessart, Spielberg, Stupferich, Sulzbach, Völkersbach, Malsch, and Wolfartsweier municipalities)
1969	182	Pforzheim – Karlsruhe-Land I	Pforzheim city; Landkreis Pforzheim district; Landkreis Karlsruhe district (only Auerbach, Bruchhausen, Burbach, Busenbach, Ettlingen, Ettlingenweier, Etzenrot, Forchheim, Grünwettersbach, Hohenwettersbach, Langensteinbach, Malsch, Mörsch, Mutschelbach, Neuburgweier, Oberweier, Palmbach, Pfaffenrot, Reichenbach, Schielberg, Schluttenbach, Schöllbronn, Spessart, Spielberg, Stupferich, Sulzbach, Völkersbach, Malsch, and Wolfartsweier municipalities)
1972	182	Pforzheim – Karlsruhe-Land I	Pforzheim city; Landkreis Pforzheim district; Landkreis Karlsruhe district (only Auerbach, Bruchhausen, Burbach, Busenbach, Ettlingen, Ettlingenweier, Etzenrot, Forchheim, Grünwettersbach, Hohenwettersbach, Langensteinbach, Malsch, Mörsch, Mutschelbach, Neuburgweier, Oberweier, Palmbach, Pfaffenrot, Reichenbach, Schielberg, Schluttenbach, Schöllbronn, Spessart, Spielberg, Stupferich, Sulzbach, Völkersbach, Malsch, and Wolfartsweier municipalities)
1976	182	Pforzheim – Karlsruhe-Land I	Pforzheim city; Landkreis Pforzheim district; Landkreis Karlsruhe district (only Auerbach, Bruchhausen, Burbach, Busenbach, Ettlingen, Ettlingenweier, Etzenrot, Forchheim, Grünwettersbach, Hohenwettersbach, Langensteinbach, Malsch, Mörsch, Mutschelbach, Neuburgweier, Oberweier, Palmbach, Pfaffenrot, Reichenbach, Schielberg, Schluttenbach, Schöllbronn, Spessart, Spielberg, Stupferich, Sulzbach, Völkersbach, Malsch, and Wolfartsweier municipalities)
1980	183	Pforzheim	Pforzheim city; Enzkreis district; Landkreis Karlsruhe district (only Oberderdingen municipality)
1983	183	Pforzheim	Pforzheim city; Enzkreis district; Landkreis Karlsruhe district (only Oberderdingen municipality)
1987	183	Pforzheim	Pforzheim city; Enzkreis district; Landkreis Karlsruhe district (only Oberderdingen municipality)
1990	183	Pforzheim	Pforzheim city; Enzkreis district; Landkreis Karlsruhe district (only Oberderdingen municipality)
1994	183	Pforzheim	Pforzheim city; Enzkreis district; Landkreis Karlsruhe district (only Oberderdingen municipality)
1998	183	Pforzheim	Pforzheim city; Enzkreis district; Landkreis Karlsruhe district (only Oberderdingen municipality)
2002	280	Pforzheim	Pforzheim city; Enzkreis district
2005	280	Pforzheim	Pforzheim city; Enzkreis district
2009	279	Pforzheim	Pforzheim city; Enzkreis district
2013	279	Pforzheim	Pforzheim city; Enzkreis district
2017	279	Pforzheim	Pforzheim city; Enzkreis district
2021	279	Pforzheim	Pforzheim city; Enzkreis district
2025	279	Pforzheim	Pforzheim city; Enzkreis district

== Members ==
The constituency has been held by Christian Democratic Union (CDU) during all but one Bundestag term since its creation. It was first represented by Siegfried Meister from 1965 to 1972, followed by Lutz Stavenhagen from 1972 to 1994. Roland Richter served one term before Ute Vogt of the Social Democratic Party (SPD) was elected in 1998. Gunther Krichbaum has been representative since 2002.

Election	Member	Party	%
1965	Siegfried Meister	CDU	46.8
1969	Siegfried Meister	CDU	50.5
1972	Lutz Stavenhagen	CDU	48.4
1976	Lutz Stavenhagen	CDU	52.8
1980	Lutz Stavenhagen	CDU	46.1
1983	Lutz Stavenhagen	CDU	53.9
1987	Lutz Stavenhagen	CDU	48.9
1990	Lutz Stavenhagen	CDU	46.9
1994	Roland Richter	CDU	44.7
1998	Ute Vogt	SPD	43.7
2002	Gunther Krichbaum	CDU	45.4
2005	Gunther Krichbaum	CDU	46.9
2009	Gunther Krichbaum	CDU	40.7
2013	Gunther Krichbaum	CDU	49.5
2017	Gunther Krichbaum	CDU	36.4
2021	Gunther Krichbaum	CDU	28.5
2025	Gunther Krichbaum	CDU	37.1

== Election results ==
=== 2025 election ===
Federal election (2025): Pforzheim
Notes:	Blue background denotes the winner of the electorate vote. Pink background denotes a candidate elected from their party list. Yellow background denotes an electorate win by a list member, or other incumbent. A ✓ or ✗ denotes status of any incumbent, win or lose respectively.						
Party	Candidate	Votes	%	±%	Party votes	%	±%
CDU	✓ Gunther Krichbaum	63,758	37.1	▲8.6	52,835	30.5	▲6.3
AfD	Diana Zimmer	46,265	26.9	▲12.8	43,959	25.4	▲11.8
SPD	Katja Mast	36,222	21.1	▼0.2	22,823	13.2	▼7.9
Left	Helmut Kuntschner	11,022	6.4	▲4.1	9,320	5.4	▲2.7
FDP	Rainer Semet	9,382	5.5	▼7.2	10,769	6.2	▼10.1
Volt	Markus Schulz-Ritz	5,378	3.1		1,343	0.8	▲0.4
Greens				▼12.7	18,236	10.5	▼2.5
dieBasis				▼1.6	526	0.3	▼1.2
Tierschutzpartei				▼2.4	2,042	1.2	▼0.8
PARTEI				▼1.4	705	0.4	▼0.5
Bündnis C					589	0.3	Steady
Team Todenhöfer							▼0.4
BD					229	0.1	
Pirates							▼0.3
ÖDP					263	0.2	0.0
BSW					7,660	4.4	
Gesundheitsforschung							▼0.1
MLPD					51	0.0	0.0
Informal votes		2,290			979		
Total valid votes		172,027			173,338		
Turnout		174,317	81.8	▲6.3			
CDU hold	Majority			▲8.6			

=== 2021 election ===
Federal election (2021): Pforzheim
Notes:	Blue background denotes the winner of the electorate vote. Pink background denotes a candidate elected from their party list. Yellow background denotes an electorate win by a list member, or other incumbent. A ✓ or ✗ denotes status of any incumbent, win or lose respectively.						
Party	Candidate	Votes	%	±%	Party votes	%	±%
CDU	✓ Gunther Krichbaum	46,291	28.5	▼8.0	39,324	24.2	▼8.6
SPD	Katja Mast	33,957	20.9	▲1.8	34,262	21.1	▲4.8
AfD	Diana Zimmer	22,943	14.1	▼1.7	22,028	13.5	▼2.8
Greens	Stephanie Aeffner	20,679	12.7	▲3.1	21,213	13.0	▲2.3
FDP	Rainer Semet	20,632	12.7	▲0.8	26,504	16.3	▲2.7
FW	Sabine Zeitler	4,407	2.7		2,914	1.8	▲1.1
Tierschutzpartei	Matthias Ebner	3,963	2.4	▲0.1	3,276	2.0	▲0.5
Left	Meltem Çelik	3,772	2.3	▼2.3	4,342	2.7	▼2.7
dieBasis	Susanne Dufke	2,555	1.6		2,428	1.5	
PARTEI	Alexander Krenz	2,270	1.4		1,532	0.9	▲0.2
Bürgerbewegung	Andreas Kubisch	1,023	0.6		866	0.5	
Bündnis C					819	0.5	
Team Todenhöfer					710	0.4	
Volt					617	0.4	
Pirates					561	0.3	0.0
ÖDP					318	0.2	0.0
NPD					218	0.1	▼0.1
Gesundheitsforschung					206	0.1	
Humanists					177	0.1	
DiB					115	0.1	▼0.1
MLPD					62	0.0	0.0
Bündnis 21					55	0.0	
LKR					52	0.0	
Independent	Siegmar Herrlinger	49	0.0				
DKP					18	0.0	0.0
Informal votes		1,441			1,365		
Total valid votes		162,541			162,617		
Turnout		163,982	75.5	▼1.0			
CDU hold	Majority	12,334	7.6	▼9.8			

=== 2017 election ===
Federal election (2017): Pforzheim
Notes:	Blue background denotes the winner of the electorate vote. Pink background denotes a candidate elected from their party list. Yellow background denotes an electorate win by a list member, or other incumbent. A ✓ or ✗ denotes status of any incumbent, win or lose respectively.						
Party	Candidate	Votes	%	±%	Party votes	%	±%
CDU	✓ Gunther Krichbaum	60,476	36.4	▼13.0	54,364	32.7	▼12.4
SPD	Katja Mast	31,611	19.0	▼3.9	27,101	16.3	▼3.9
AfD	Waldemar Birkle	26,172	15.8	▲10.7	27,107	16.3	▲9.1
FDP	Janis Wiskandt	19,760	11.9	▲6.1	22,643	13.6	▲6.5
Greens	Katrin Lechler	16,016	9.6	▲1.7	17,869	10.8	▲1.8
Left	Peter Wenzel	7,730	4.7	▲0.6	8,952	5.4	▲0.8
Tierschutzpartei	Patricia Kopietz	3,892	2.3		2,536	1.5	▲0.7
PARTEI					1,171	0.7	
FW					1,138	0.7	0.0
Pirates					609	0.4	▼1.8
NPD					446	0.3	▼1.1
ÖDP					371	0.2	0.0
Tierschutzallianz					352	0.2	
BGE					303	0.2	
DM					269	0.2	
Menschliche Welt					217	0.1	
DiB					201	0.1	
V-Partei³					189	0.1	
MLPD					116	0.1	0.0
DIE RECHTE	Oscar Fernbacher	168	0.1		110	0.1	
Independent	Wolf Glück	148	0.1				
DKP					16	0.0	
Informal votes		2,004			1,897		
Total valid votes		165,973			166,080		
Turnout		167,977	76.5	▲4.0			
CDU hold	Majority	28,865	17.4	▼9.2			

=== 2013 election ===
Federal election (2013): Pforzheim
Notes:	Blue background denotes the winner of the electorate vote. Pink background denotes a candidate elected from their party list. Yellow background denotes an electorate win by a list member, or other incumbent. A ✓ or ✗ denotes status of any incumbent, win or lose respectively.						
Party	Candidate	Votes	%	±%	Party votes	%	±%
CDU	✓ Gunther Krichbaum	77,737	49.5	▲8.7	70,997	45.1	▲10.6
SPD	Katja Mast	36,059	22.9	▲0.1	31,788	20.2	▲0.2
Greens	Memet Kilic	12,539	8.0	▼2.0	14,081	8.9	▼2.5
FDP	Erik Schweickert	9,064	5.8	▼10.4	11,171	7.1	▼12.6
AfD	Frank Plonus	8,045	5.1		11,379	7.2	
Left	Milan Kopriva	6,435	4.1	▼2.7	7,248	4.6	▼2.8
Pirates	Holger Reichert	3,457	2.2		3,405	2.2	▲0.2
NPD	Günther Ragg	2,502	1.6	▼0.5	2,125	1.4	0.0
Tierschutzpartei					1,324	0.8	▲0.1
FW	Marco Rapp	1,359	0.9		1,014	0.6	
REP					613	0.4	▼0.6
PBC					598	0.4	▼0.5
RENTNER					460	0.3	
ÖDP					389	0.2	0.0
Volksabstimmung					317	0.2	▼0.1
PRO					176	0.1	
Party of Reason					160	0.1	
BIG					98	0.1	
MLPD					38	0.0	0.0
BüSo					15	0.0	0.0
Informal votes		2,294			2,095		
Total valid votes		157,197			157,396		
Turnout		159,491	72.5	▲1.9			
CDU hold	Majority	41,678	26.6	▲8.8			

=== 2009 election ===
Federal election (2009): Pforzheim
Notes:	Blue background denotes the winner of the electorate vote. Pink background denotes a candidate elected from their party list. Yellow background denotes an electorate win by a list member, or other incumbent. A ✓ or ✗ denotes status of any incumbent, win or lose respectively.						
Party	Candidate	Votes	%	±%	Party votes	%	±%
CDU	✓ Gunther Krichbaum	62,224	40.7	▼6.2	52,771	34.5	▼4.7
SPD	Katja Mast	34,944	22.9	▼11.5	30,652	20.0	▼11.1
FDP	Erik Schweickert	24,640	16.1	▲8.7	30,192	19.7	▲7.1
Greens	Memet Kılıç	15,236	10.0	▲4.6	17,556	11.5	▲3.0
Left	Annette Groth	10,353	6.8	▲2.9	11,279	7.4	▲3.4
Pirates					3,048	2.0	
NPD	Albert Baumgärtner	3,172	2.1	▲0.1	2,029	1.3	▲0.1
REP					1,439	0.9	▼0.2
PBC	Kai Rebmann	2,218	1.5		1,374	0.9	0.0
Tierschutzpartei					1,211	0.8	
Volksabstimmung					450	0.3	
ÖDP					412	0.3	
DIE VIOLETTEN					337	0.2	
DVU					148	0.1	
MLPD					73	0.0	0.0
BüSo					67	0.0	0.0
ADM					64	0.0	
Informal votes		3,120			2,805		
Total valid votes		152,787			153,102		
Turnout		155,907	70.6	▼6.8			
CDU hold	Majority	27,280	17.8	▲5.3			

=== 2005 election ===
Federal election (2005):Pforzheim
Notes:	Blue background denotes the winner of the electorate vote. Pink background denotes a candidate elected from their party list. Yellow background denotes an electorate win by a list member, or other incumbent. A ✓ or ✗ denotes status of any incumbent, win or lose respectively.						
Party	Candidate	Votes	%	±%	Party votes	%	±%
CDU	✓ Gunther Krichbaum	77,861	46.9	▲1.5	65,153	39.2	▼4.4
SPD	Katja Mast	57,135	34.4	▼7.8	51,706	31.1	▼3.4
FDP	Erick Schweickert	12,296	7.4	▲1.2	21,025	12.6	▲4.5
Greens	Memet Kilic	8,992	5.4	▲1.4	14,023	8.4	▼0.5
Left	Wolfgang Schulz	6,439	3.9	▲2.9	6,676	4.0	▲3.2
NPD	Sandra Rübel	3,280	2.0		2,083	1.3	▲0.9
REP					1,922	1.2	0.0
PBC					1,416	0.9	0.0
Familie					1,271	0.8	
GRAUEN					842	0.5	▲0.3
MLPD					144	0.1	
BüSo					105	0.1	
Informal votes		3,439			3,076		
Total valid votes		166,003			166,366		
Turnout		169,442	77.4	▼2.9			
CDU hold	Majority	20,726	12.5				
