= Göppingen (Bundestag electoral district) =

Federal electoral district of Germany

263 Göppingen
- Electoral district for the Bundestag
- Göppingen in 2025
- State: Baden-Württemberg
- Population: 258,100 (2019)
- Electorate: 177,107 (2021)
- Major settlements: Göppingen; Geislingen an der Steige; Eislingen
- Area: 642.3 km^{2}

Current electoral district
- Created: 1949
- Party: CDU
- Member: Hermann Färber
- Elected: 2013, 2017, 2021, 2025

Göppingen is an electoral constituency (German: Wahlkreis) represented in the Bundestag. It elects one member via first-past-the-post voting. Under the current constituency numbering system, it is designated as constituency 263. It is located in eastern Baden-Württemberg, comprising the Göppingen district.

Göppingen was created for the inaugural 1949 federal election. Since 2013, it has been represented by Hermann Färber of the Christian Democratic Union (CDU).

== Geography ==
Göppingen is located in eastern Baden-Württemberg. As of the 2021 federal election, it is coterminous with the Göppingen district.

== History ==
Göppingen was created in 1949. In the 1949 election, it was Württemberg-Baden Landesbezirk Württemberg constituency 7 in the numbering system. In the 1953 through 1961 elections, it was number 169. In the 1965 through 1976 elections, it was number 172. In the 1980 through 1998 elections, it was number 167. In the 2002 and 2005 elections, it was number 264. Since the 2009 election, it has been number 263.

Originally, the constituency comprised the Göppingen district and the municipalities of Bissingen an der Teck, Dettingen unter Teck, Holzmaden, Kirchheim unter Teck, Lenningen, Neidlingen, Notzingen, Ohmden, Owen, Weilheim an der Teck, and Wolfschlugen from the Nürtingen district. It acquired its current borders in the 1965 election.

Election	No.	Name	Borders
1949	7	Göppingen	Göppingen district; Nürtingen district (only Bissingen an der Teck, Dettingen unter Teck, Holzmaden, Kirchheim unter Teck, Lenningen, Neidlingen, Notzingen, Ohmden, Owen, Weilheim an der Teck, and Wolfschlugen municipalities)
1953	169	Göppingen	Göppingen district; Nürtingen district (only Bissingen an der Teck, Dettingen unter Teck, Holzmaden, Kirchheim unter Teck, Lenningen, Neidlingen, Notzingen, Ohmden, Owen, Weilheim an der Teck, and Wolfschlugen municipalities)
1957	169	Göppingen	Göppingen district; Nürtingen district (only Bissingen an der Teck, Dettingen unter Teck, Holzmaden, Kirchheim unter Teck, Lenningen, Neidlingen, Notzingen, Ohmden, Owen, Weilheim an der Teck, and Wolfschlugen municipalities)
1961	169	Göppingen	Göppingen district; Nürtingen district (only Bissingen an der Teck, Dettingen unter Teck, Holzmaden, Kirchheim unter Teck, Lenningen, Neidlingen, Notzingen, Ohmden, Owen, Weilheim an der Teck, and Wolfschlugen municipalities)
1965	172	Göppingen	Göppingen district
1969	172	Göppingen	Göppingen district
1972	172	Göppingen	Göppingen district
1976	172	Göppingen	Göppingen district
1980	167	Göppingen	Göppingen district
1983	167	Göppingen	Göppingen district
1987	167	Göppingen	Göppingen district
1990	167	Göppingen	Göppingen district
1994	167	Göppingen	Göppingen district
1998	167	Göppingen	Göppingen district
2002	264	Göppingen	Göppingen district
2005	264	Göppingen	Göppingen district
2009	263	Göppingen	Göppingen district
2013	263	Göppingen	Göppingen district
2017	263	Göppingen	Göppingen district
2021	263	Göppingen	Göppingen district
2025	263	Göppingen	Göppingen district

== Members ==
The constituency has been held continuously by the Christian Democratic Union (CDU) since its creation. It was first represented by Georg Baur from 1949 to 1953, followed by Hermann Finckh from 1953 to 1965. Manfred Wörner was representative from 1965 to 1990, a total of seven consecutive terms. Claus Jäger served one term from 1990 to 1994, followed by Klaus Riegert from 1994 to 2013. Hermann Färber was elected in 2013, and re-elected in 2017 and 2021.

Election	Member	Party	%
1949	Georg Baur	CDU	26.9
1953	Hermann Finckh	CDU	46.6
1957	Hermann Finckh	CDU	48.3
1961	Hermann Finckh	CDU	38.1
1965	Manfred Wörner	CDU	50.3
1969	Manfred Wörner	CDU	53.1
1972	Manfred Wörner	CDU	48.2
1976	Manfred Wörner	CDU	50.8
1980	Manfred Wörner	CDU	48.4
1983	Manfred Wörner	CDU	47.6
1987	Manfred Wörner	CDU	49.0
1990	Claus Jäger	CDU	43.6
1994	Klaus Riegert	CDU	46.1
1998	Klaus Riegert	CDU	42.4
2002	Klaus Riegert	CDU	48.0
2005	Klaus Riegert	CDU	48.3
2009	Klaus Riegert	CDU	43.1
2013	Hermann Färber	CDU	49.0
2017	Hermann Färber	CDU	37.6
2021	Hermann Färber	CDU	31.0
2025	Hermann Färber	CDU	37.1

== Election results ==
=== 2025 ===
Federal election (2025): Göppingen
Notes:	Blue background denotes the winner of the electorate vote. Pink background denotes a candidate elected from their party list. Yellow background denotes an electorate win by a list member, or other incumbent. A ✓ or ✗ denotes status of any incumbent, win or lose respectively.						
Party	Candidate	Votes	%	±%	Party votes	%	±%
CDU	✓ Hermann Färber	52,945	37.1	▲6.1	47,870	33.5	▲7.4
AfD	Hans-Jürgen Goßner	32,263	22.6	▲10.8	33,279	23.3	▲11.8
FDP	Anna Ortwein	5,839	4.1	▼8.2	7,925	5.5	▼10.6
Greens	Moritz Gerstein	13,239	9.3	▼2.6	13,447	9.4	▼3.2
SPD	Franziska Blessing	24,232	17.0	▼6.8	20,544	14.4	▼9.0
FW	Andreas Cerrotta	4,449	3.1	▼0.2	2,137	1.5	▼0.4
Left	Sabine Schapke	6,812	4.8	▲2.6	7,797	5.5	▲3.0
dieBasis	Patrick Coleman	2,653	1.2	▼1.0	729	0.5	▼. 1.2
Tierschutzpartei					1,228	0.9	▼0.4
PARTEI				▼1.5	604	0.4	▼0.5
Team Todenhöfer							▼0.5
Pirates							▼0.4
Volt	Daniel Pittroff	1,072	0.8		674	0.5	▲0.2
ÖDP					257	0.2	0.0
Bürgerbewegung							▼0.4
Gesundheitsforschung							▼0.1
Bündnis C					168	0.1	0.0
BD					175	0.1	
BSW					6,137	4.3	0.0
Humanists							▼0.1
MLPD	Christel Beck	177	0.1	0.0	68	0.0	0.0
Informal votes		1,197			839		
Total valid votes		142,681			143,039		
Turnout		143,878	82.4	▲5.8			
CDU hold	Majority			▲6.1			

=== 2021 ===
Federal election (2021): Göppingen
Notes:	Blue background denotes the winner of the electorate vote. Pink background denotes a candidate elected from their party list. Yellow background denotes an electorate win by a list member, or other incumbent. A ✓ or ✗ denotes status of any incumbent, win or lose respectively.						
Party	Candidate	Votes	%	±%	Party votes	%	±%
CDU	✓ Hermann Färber	41,558	31.0	▼6.6	35,079	26.1	▼7.2
SPD	Heike Baehrens	31,824	23.7	▲1.8	31,422	23.4	▲5.8
FDP	Jan Olsson	16,481	12.3	▲3.1	21,723	16.2	▲3.5
Greens	Viktoria Kruse	15,932	11.9	▼0.2	16,916	12.6	▲0.3
AfD	Volker Münz	15,818	11.8	▼2.7	15,412	11.5	▼3.2
FW	Andreas Cerrotta	4,394	3.3		2,525	1.9	▲1.2
Left	Eva-Maria Glathe-Braun	2,958	2.2	▼2.2	3,338	2.5	▼2.6
dieBasis	Karlheinz Siegmund	2,839	2.1		2,340	1.7	
Tierschutzpartei					1,660	1.2	▲0.3
PARTEI	Christian Treder	2,033	1.5		1,176	0.9	▲0.2
Team Todenhöfer					685	0.5	
Pirates					504	0.4	▼0.2
Volt					336	0.2	
ÖDP					293	0.2	0.0
Bürgerbewegung					177	0.1	
Gesundheitsforschung					161	0.1	
Bündnis C					158	0.1	
NPD					150	0.1	▼0.2
DiB					122	0.1	0.0
Humanists					85	0.1	
MLPD	Christel Beck	170	0.1	▼0.1	59	0.0	▼0.1
Bündnis 21					55	0.0	
LKR					31	0.0	
DKP					16	0.0	0.0
Informal votes		1,599			1,183		
Total valid votes		134,007			134,423		
Turnout		135,606	76.6	▼0.6			
CDU hold	Majority	9,734	7.3	▼8.4			

=== 2017 ===
Federal election (2017): Göppingen
Notes:	Blue background denotes the winner of the electorate vote. Pink background denotes a candidate elected from their party list. Yellow background denotes an electorate win by a list member, or other incumbent. A ✓ or ✗ denotes status of any incumbent, win or lose respectively.						
Party	Candidate	Votes	%	±%	Party votes	%	±%
CDU	✓ Hermann Färber	50,892	37.6	▼11.5	45,290	33.3	▼12.5
SPD	Heike Baehrens	29,730	21.9	▼2.3	23,924	17.6	▼4.1
AfD	Volker Münz	19,588	14.5	▲9.2	19,956	14.7	▲8.4
Greens	Dietrich Burchard	16,420	12.1	▲1.4	16,749	12.3	▲2.2
FDP	Hans-Peter Semmler	12,492	9.2	▲5.9	17,188	15.6	▲6.8
Left	Konstantinos Katevas	5,994	4.4	▲0.8	6,882	5.1	▲0.8
Tierschutzpartei					1,246	0.9	▲0.2
FW					907	0.7	▲0.3
PARTEI					898	0.7	
Pirates					801	0.6	▼1.4
NPD					372	0.3	▼0.9
ÖDP					344	0.3	▼0.1
Tierschutzallianz					296	0.2	
DM					221	0.2	
BGE					187	0.1	
V-Partei³					172	0.1	
Menschliche Welt					158	0.1	
DiB					153	0.1	
MLPD	Christel Beck	354	0.3		136	0.1	0.0
DIE RECHTE					43	0.0	
DKP					25	0.0	
Informal votes		2,115			1,637		
Total valid votes		135,470			135,948		
Turnout		137,585	77.1	▲3.1			
CDU hold	Majority	21,162	15.7	▼9.1			

=== 2013 ===
Federal election (2013): Göppingen
Notes:	Blue background denotes the winner of the electorate vote. Pink background denotes a candidate elected from their party list. Yellow background denotes an electorate win by a list member, or other incumbent. A ✓ or ✗ denotes status of any incumbent, win or lose respectively.						
Party	Candidate	Votes	%	±%	Party votes	%	±%
CDU	Hermann Färber	64,095	49.0	▲5.9	60,058	45.8	▲12.7
SPD	Heike Baehrens	31,646	24.2	▼2.4	28,435	21.7	▲0.9
Greens	Dennis De	14,010	10.7	▼0.3	13,275	10.1	▼3.2
AfD	Volker Münz	6,891	5.3		8,259	6.3	
Left	Thomas Edtmaier	4,710	3.6	▼2.8	5,569	4.2	▼3.0
FDP	Werner Simmling	4,393	3.4	▼7.0	7,646	5.8	▼13.3
Pirates	Julian Beier	2,557	2.0		2,629	2.0	▲0.2
NPD	Alexander Neidlein	1,813	1.4	▼0.5	1,599	1.2	▼0.1
Tierschutzpartei					1,000	0.8	0.0
REP					552	0.4	▼0.7
FW					530	0.4	
ÖDP	Albert Seitzer	596	0.5	▼0.3	403	0.3	▼0.1
RENTNER					289	0.2	
PBC					240	0.2	▼0.2
Volksabstimmung					198	0.2	▼0.1
BIG					129	0.1	
Party of Reason					115	0.1	
PRO					93	0.1	
MLPD					67	0.1	0.0
BüSo					17	0.0	▼0.1
Informal votes		1,921			1,529		
Total valid votes		130,711			131,103		
Turnout		132,632	74.0	▲2.1			
CDU hold	Majority	32,449	24.8	▲8.3			

=== 2009 ===
Federal election (2009): Göppingen
Notes:	Blue background denotes the winner of the electorate vote. Pink background denotes a candidate elected from their party list. Yellow background denotes an electorate win by a list member, or other incumbent. A ✓ or ✗ denotes status of any incumbent, win or lose respectively.						
Party	Candidate	Votes	%	±%	Party votes	%	±%
CDU	✓ Klaus Riegert	55,049	43.1	▼5.2	42,318	33.1	▼4.9
SPD	Sascha Binder	33,916	26.6	▼9.9	26,524	20.7	▼10.7
Greens	Bernhard Lehle	14,009	11.0	▲6.0	17,018	13.3	▲3.8
FDP	Werner Simmling	13,177	10.3	▲6.0	24,408	19.1	▲6.8
Left	Sabine Rösch-Dammenmiller	8,157	6.4	▲2.6	9,327	7.3	▲3.3
Pirates					2,371	1.9	
NPD	Otto Nagel	2,385	1.9	▼0.3	1,730	1.4	▼0.2
REP					1,377	1.1	▼0.2
Tierschutzpartei					956	0.7	
ÖDP	Johanna Kaufmann	920	0.7		523	0.4	
PBC					465	0.4	▼0.2
DIE VIOLETTEN					325	0.3	
Volksabstimmung					261	0.2	
MLPD					79	0.1	▼0.1
DVU					68	0.1	
BüSo					60	0.0	0.0
ADM					46	0.0	
Informal votes		2,288			2,045		
Total valid votes		127,613			127,856		
Turnout		129,901	72.0	▼6.8			
CDU hold	Majority	21,133	16.5	▲4.7			

=== 2005 election ===
Federal election (2005): Göppingen
Notes:	Blue background denotes the winner of the electorate vote. Pink background denotes a candidate elected from their party list. Yellow background denotes an electorate win by a list member, or other incumbent. A ✓ or ✗ denotes status of any incumbent, win or lose respectively.						
Party	Candidate	Votes	%	±%	Party votes	%	±%
CDU	✓ Klaus Riegert	67,443	48.3	▲0.3	53,166	38.0	▼4.1
SPD	Walter Riester	50,859	36.4	▼3.2	44,017	31.5	▼4.1
Greens	Andreas Braun	6,956	5.0	▲0.4	13,356	9.5	▼0.7
FDP	Werner Simmling	5,985	4.3	▼0.2	17,179	12.3	▲4.8
Left	Gerhard Wick	5,278	3.8	▲3.2	5,609	4.0	▲3.3
NPD	Olaf Gutte	3,011	2.2		2,238	1.6	▲1.4
REP					1,736	1.2	▼0.4
Familie					1,0.6	0.7	
PBC					728	0.5	▲0.1
GRAUEN					548	0.4	▲0.3
MLPD					183	0.1	
BüSo					85	0.1	
Informal votes		2,923			2,574		
Total valid votes		139,532			139,881		
Turnout		142,455	78.8	▼2.5			
CDU hold	Majority	16,584	11.9				
