= 2006 Baden-Württemberg state election =

State election in Germany

← 2001	26 March 2006	2011 →

All 139 seats in the Landtag of Baden-Württemberg 70 seats needed for a majority
- Turnout: 3,960,345 (53.4%) ▼9.2%
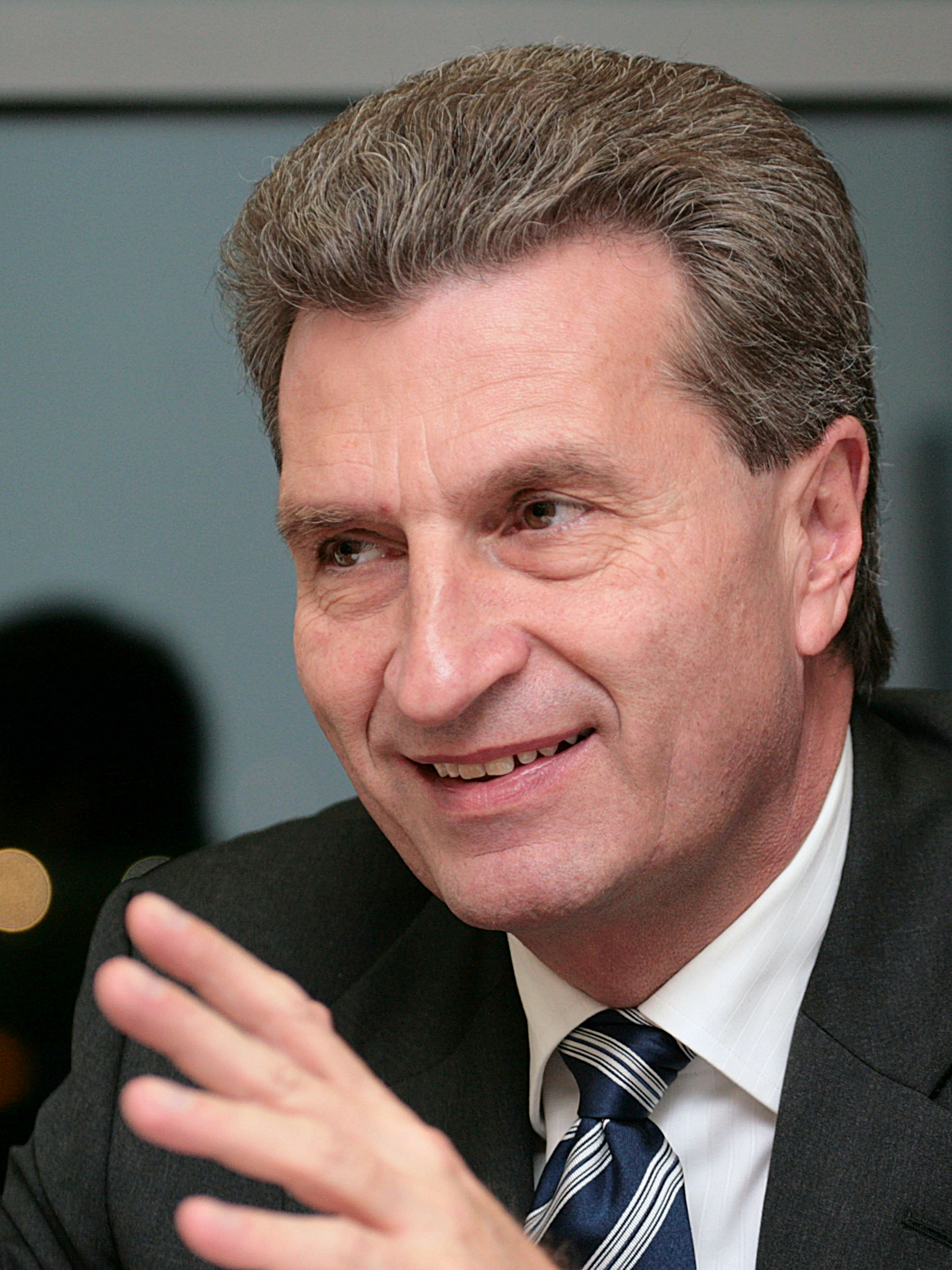

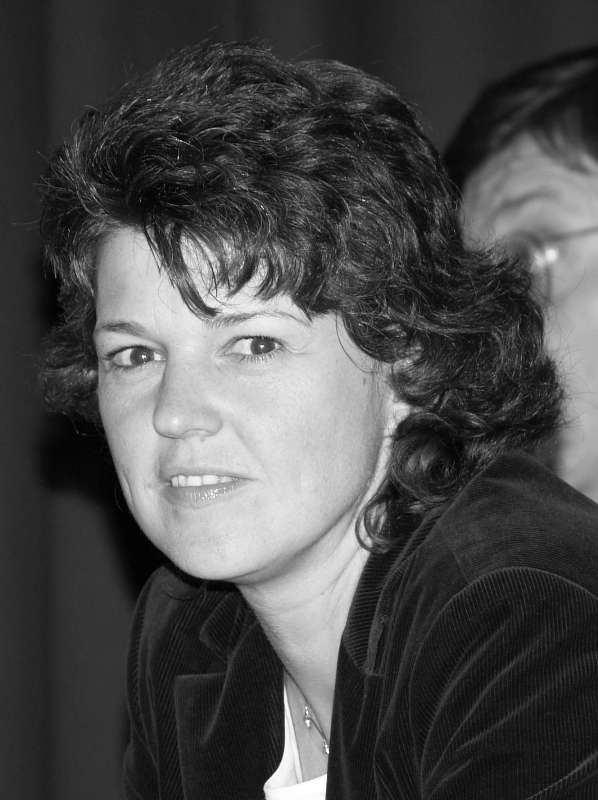

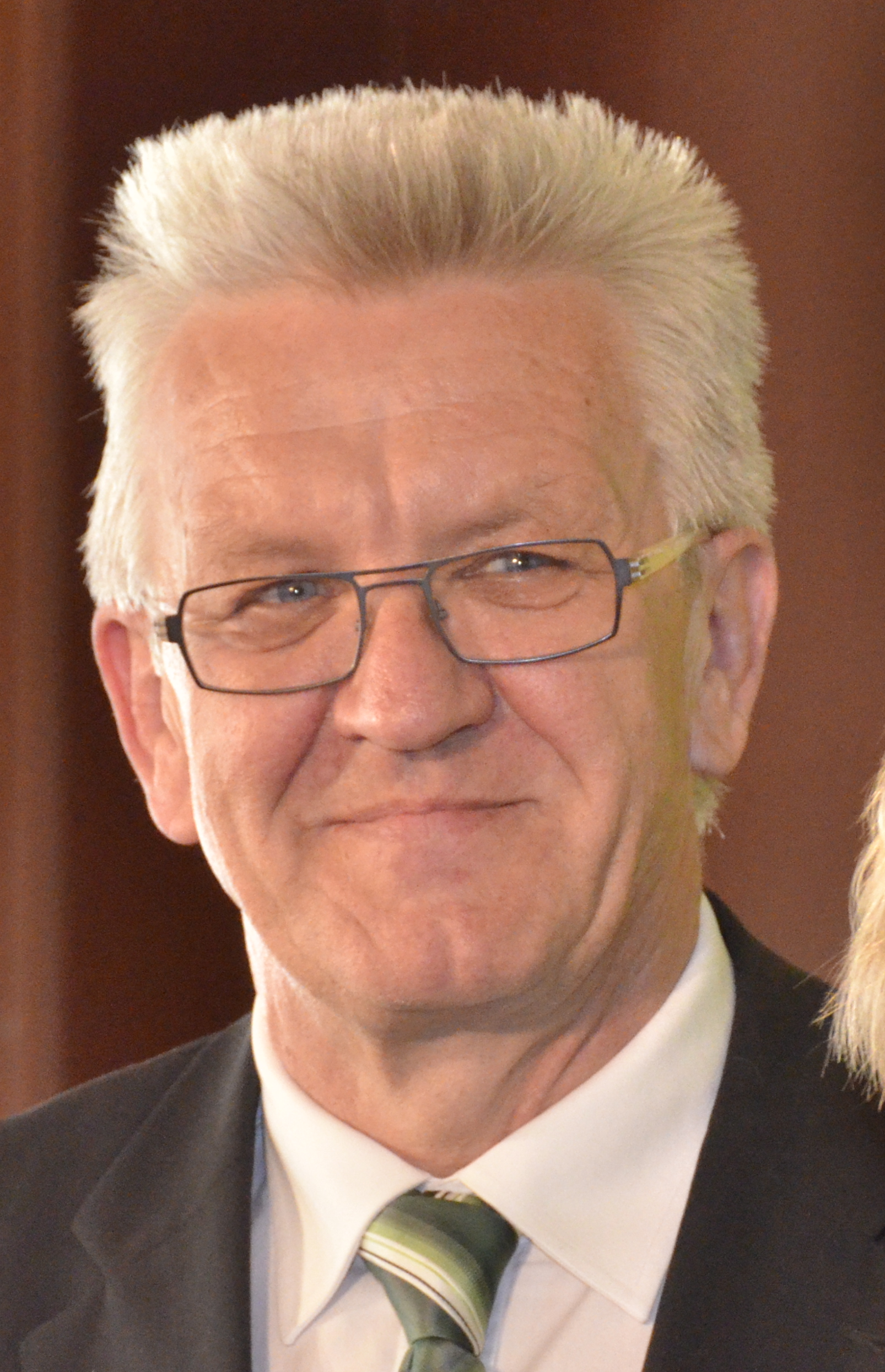

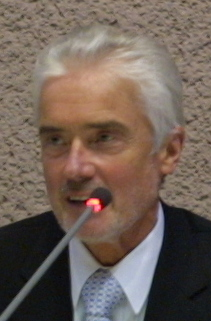
	First party	Second party
Leader	Günther Oettinger	Ute Vogt
Party	CDU	SPD
Last election	63 seats, 44.8%	45 seats, 33.3%
Seats won	69	38
Seat change	▲6	▼7
Popular vote	1,748,781	996,095
Percentage	44.2%	25.2%
Swing	▼0.6%	▼8.1%
	Third party	Fourth party
Leader	Winfried Kretschmann	Ulrich Goll
Party	Greens	FDP
Last election	10 seats, 7.7%	10 seats, 8.1%
Seats won	17	15
Seat change	▲7	▲5
Popular vote	462,889	421,885
Percentage	11.7%	10.7%
Swing	▲4.0%	▲2.6%
- Results for the single-member constituencies.
Minister-President before election
Günther Oettinger
CDU
Elected Minister-President
Günther Oettinger
CDU

The 2006 Baden-Württemberg state election was held on 26 March 2006 to elect the members of the 13th Landtag of Baden-Württemberg. The incumbent coalition government of the Christian Democratic Union (CDU) and Free Democratic Party (FDP) led by Minister-President Günther Oettinger was re-elected with an increased majority and continued in office.

== Parties ==
The table below lists parties represented in the previous Landtag of Baden-Württemberg.

Name		Ideology	Leader(s)	2001 result	
Name		Ideology	Leader(s)	Votes (%)	Seats
CDU	Christian Democratic Union of Germany; Christlich Demokratische Union Deutschlands	Christian democracy	Günther Oettinger	44.8%	63 / 128
SPD	Social Democratic Party of Germany; Sozialdemokratische Partei Deutschlands	Social democracy	Ute Vogt	33.3%	45 / 128
FDP	Free Democratic Party; Freie Demokratische Partei	Classical liberalism	Ulrich Goll	8.1%	10 / 128
Grüne	Alliance 90/The Greens; Bündnis 90/Die Grünen	Green politics	Winfried Kretschmann	7.7%	10 / 128

== Opinion polling ==
Polling firm	Fieldwork date	Sample size	CDU	SPD	FDP	Grüne	WASG	Others	Lead
2006 state election	26 Mar 2006	–	44.2	25.2	10.7	11.7	3.1	5.3	19.0
Emnid	7–18 Mar 2006	1,000	45	29	9	10	2	5	16
Forschungsgruppe Wahlen	13–16 Mar 2006	~1,000	45	30	8	10	3	4	15
Infratest dimap	13–15 Mar 2006	1,000	46	28	9	10	2	5	16
IfM Leipzig	13–15 Mar 2006	1,008	43	31	9	10	2	5	12
Infratest dimap	28 Feb–1 Mar 2006	1,000	46	29	8	10	3	4	17
IfM Leipzig	6–8 Feb 2006	1,001	49	30	8	7	2	4	19
Infratest dimap	30 Jan–1 Feb 2006	1,000	45	29	9	9	4	4	16
Allensbach	28 Sep–13 Oct 2005	~1,000	45.0	30.0	8.5	8.5	4	4.0	15.0
IfM Leipzig	16–18 Nov 2004	1,000	49	29	6	10	–	6	20
Forsa	29–30 Oct 2004	1,002	50	28	6	9	–	7	22
IfM Leipzig	19 Oct 2004	1,008	49	27	7	13	–	4	22
Emnid	17 Oct 2004	?	49	26	7	15	–	3	23
Infratest dimap	23–26 Jul 2004	1,004	48	23	6	17	–	6	25
Allensbach	5–17 Jun 2004	1,000	50.5	25.0	7.0	11.5	–	6.0	25.5
Infratest dimap	1–6 Jun 2004	1,004	51	26	7	12	–	4	25
Infratest dimap	12 Feb 2004	?	52	26	8	11	–	3	26
Allensbach	12–25 Sep 2003	?	52	25	7	11	–	5	27
Allensbach	3–7 Feb 2003	1,100	54	24	8	10	–	4	30
2001 state election	25 Mar 2001	–	44.8	33.3	8.1	7.7	–	6.1	10.2

== Results ==
Summary of the 26 March 2006 election results for the Landtag of Baden-Württemberg
Party	Votes	%	+/-	Seats	+/-	Seats %
Christian Democratic Union (CDU)	1,748,781	44.2	▼0.6	69	▲6	49.7
Social Democratic Party (SPD)	996,095	25.2	▼8.1	38	▼7	27.3
Alliance 90/The Greens (Grüne)	462,889	11.7	▲4.0	17	▲7	12.2
Free Democratic Party (FDP)	421,885	10.7	▲2.6	15	▲5	10.8
Labour and Social Justice – The Electoral Alternative (WASG)	121,875	3.1	New	0	New	0
The Republicans (REP)	100,079	2.5	▼1.9	0	±0	0
Others	108,741	2.6	0.0	0	±0	0
Total	3,960,345	100.0		139	▲11	
Voter turnout		53.4	▼9.2			

Popular Vote
CDU	44.16%
SPD	25.15%
B'90/GRÜNE	11.69%
FDP	10.65%
WASG	3.08%
REP	2.53%
Other	2.75%

Landtag seats
CDU	49.64%
SPD	27.34%
B'90/GRÜNE	12.23%
FDP	10.79%
