= Riegert =

Riegert is a German surname. Notable people with the surname include:

- Elke Heidenreich (née Riegert; born 1943), German author and journalist
- Klaus Riegert (born 1959), German politician
- Peter Riegert (born 1947), American actor
