= Gunther Krichbaum =

German politician

Gunther Krichbaum MdB
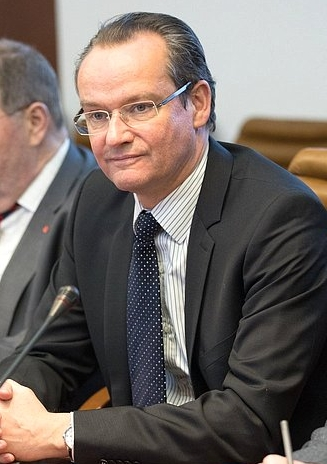
- Krichbaum in 2017

Minister of State for Europe
- Incumbent
- Assumed office 6 May 2025
- Minister: Johann Wadephul
- Preceded by: Anna Lührmann

Member of the Bundestag; for Pforzheim
- Incumbent
- Assumed office 17 October 2002
- Preceded by: Ute Vogt

Personal details
- Born: 5 April 1964 (age 62) Korntal, West Germany
- Party: Christian Democratic Union
- Children: 3
- Education: University of Tübingen; Heidelberg University
- Profession: Lawyer

Military service
- Allegiance: Germany
- Branch/service: Bundeswehr
- Years of service: 1984–1985

Gunther Krichbaum (born 4 May 1964) is a German lawyer and politician of the Christian Democratic Union of Germany (CDU) who has been a member of the German Bundestag since the 2002 elections.

In addition to his work in parliament, Krichbaum has been serving as Minister of State at the Federal Foreign Office in the government of Chancellor Friedrich Merz since 2025.

In parliament, Krichbaum was a member of the Committee on Affairs of the European Union from 2002 to 2025. From 2007 to 2021 he served as the Committee's chairman, in 2021 to 2025 he was the CDU/CSU group's spokesperson on European affairs. In addition to German, Krichbaum is fluent in English and French.

== Early life and career ==
After graduating from high school at Solitude grammar school in Stuttgart-Weilimdorf in 1984, Krichbaum completed his military service in Sigmaringen and Dillingen / Danube. From 1985 onwards he studied law at the Eberhard Karls University of Tübingen and the Ruprecht-Karls-University Heidelberg as well as in Lausanne and Geneva which he finished in 1991 with the first state examination in law. During his studies, he received a scholarship from the Konrad-Adenauer-Foundation and became a member of the student association Ulmia Tübingen.

After completing his legal clerkship in Heidelberg, Krichbaum passed the second state examination in 1995 and subsequently worked until 2002 as a self-employed economic consultant for MLP AG in Pforzheim.

== Political career ==
Krichbaum joined the Junge Union in 1979 and also the CDU in 1983. He was deputy chairman of the CDU city association Pforzheim from 1999 to 2009 and he serves a district chairman of the CDU Enzkreis / Pforzheim since 2009.

Krichbaum has been a member of the German Bundestag since the 2002 elections. From 2005, he served as a deputy spokesman for the European Parliament of the CDU/CSU parliamentary group, under the leadership of the group's chairman Volker Kauder. During that time, he was also his parliamentary group's rapporteur on Romania.

From 2007 until 2021, Krichbaum chaired the Committee on European Affairs. In addition to his committee assignments, he has been a member of the German delegation to the Franco-German Parliamentary Assembly since 2019.

Krichbaum was always directly elected as a representative of the constituency Pforzheim in the Bundestag. In his first election in 2002, he was able to regain for the CDU the direct mandate lost in 1998 to the SPD against the state leader of the SPD Baden-Württemberg, Ute Vogt. He defended this in 2005 with 46.9% and in 2009 with 40.7% of the first votes. In the general election in 2013, he reached with 49.5% of the first votes the best result of the CDU in this constituency since the federal election in 1983. In his fifth federal elections 2017, he could not repeat this result, but won the direct mandate with 36.4% of the votes.

In the negotiations to form a fourth coalition government under Chancellor Angela Merkel following the 2017 federal elections, Krichbaum was part of the working group on European policy, led by Peter Altmaier, Alexander Dobrindt and Achim Post.

On the EU level, Krichbaum serves on the board of the European People's Party (EPP).

== Other activities ==
- Atlantik-Brücke, Member
- Franco-German Institute (DFI), Member of the Board
- Robert Schuman Foundation, Member of the Board of Directors
- Institute for European Politics (IEP), Member of the Board of Trustees
- Europa-Union Deutschland, Member of the Board
- German-Romanian Association Pforzheim, Member of the Board
- Federal Association of Lebenshilfe supporting people with disabilities, Member
- Friends of the Pforzheim University of Applied Sciences, Member
- 1. CfR Pforzheim, Member
- Church synod of the protestant church Pforzheim-Land, Member

== Recognition ==
The Queen of the Netherlands appointed Krichbaum to the Grand Officer of the Order of Orange Nassau, in 2009 he was appointed Officer of the Legion of Honor by the French President and in 2010 appointed by the Romanian President as Commander of the Star of Romania. In 2012 he received the Decoration of Honour for Services to the Republic of Austria.

== Political positions ==
In June 2017, Krichbaum voted against Germany’s introduction of same-sex marriage. Ahead of the Christian Democrats’ leadership election in 2018, he publicly endorsed Friedrich Merz to succeed Angela Merkel as the party’s chair.

== Personal life ==
Krichbaum is protestant, married a second time and father of three children from his first marriage.
