= Lutz Stavenhagen =

German politician (1940-1992)

Lutz Stavenhangen
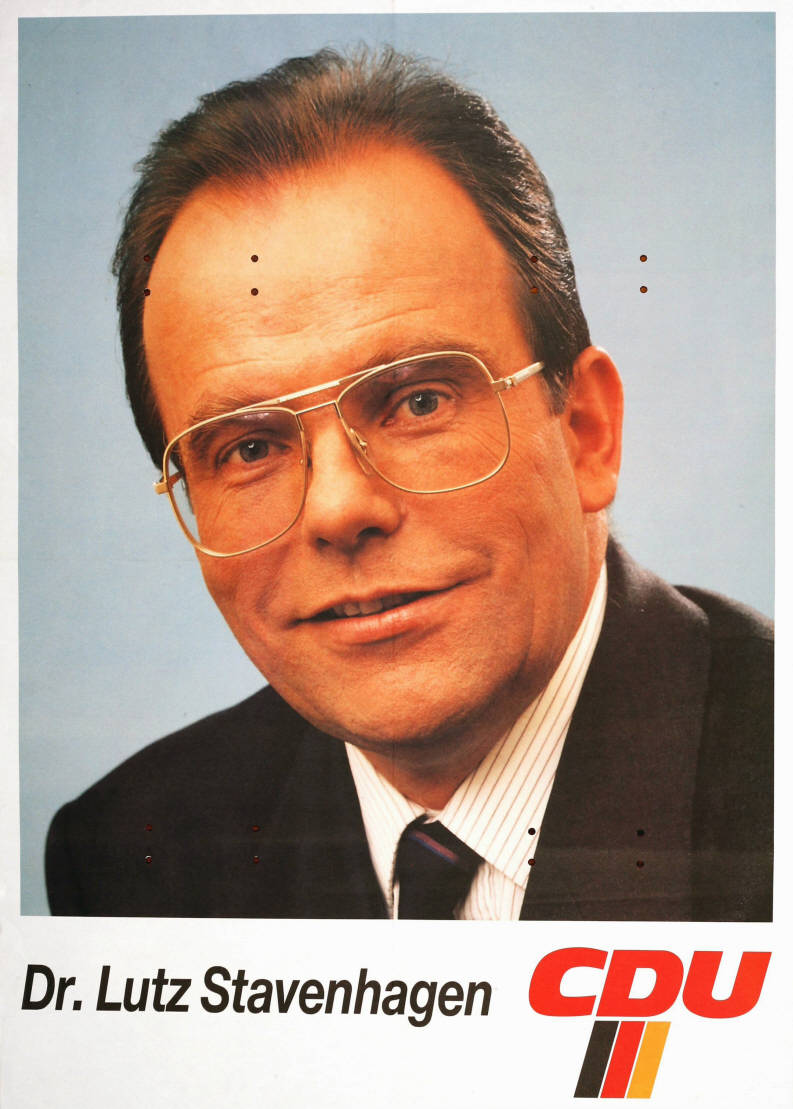

Commissioner for the Federal Intelligence Services
- In office 3 May 1989 – 2 December 1991
- Preceded by: Waldemar Schreckenberger
- Succeeded by: Bernd Schmidbauer

Minister of State for the Federal Chancellery
- In office 12 March 1987 – 3 December 1991
- Chancellor: Helmut Kohl

Minister of State for the Foreign Office
- In office 4 September 1985 – 12 March 1987
- Chancellor: Helmut Kohl
- Preceded by: Alois Mertes
- Succeeded by: Irmgard Schwaetzer

Member of the Bundestag
- In office 13 December 1972 – 31 May 1992
- Preceded by: Siegfried Meister
- Succeeded by: Klaus Riegert
- Constituency: Pforzheim – Karlsruhe-Land I (1972–1980); Pforzheim (1980–1992)

Personal details
- Born: 6 May 1940 Jena, Thuringia, Germany
- Died: 31 May 1992 (aged 52) Pforzheim, Baden-Württemberg, Germany
- Party: Christian Democratic Union
- Education: University of Saarbrücken; University of Tübingen

Lutz-Georg Stavenhagen (6 May 1940 – 31 May 1992) was a German politician and member of the Christian Democratic Union of Germany (CDU). He was Minister of State in the Foreign Office from 1985 to 1987 and Minister of State in the Federal Chancellery from 1987 to 1991.

== Early life ==
Stavenhagen attended schools in Oberkirch (Baden) (1950–1951 and 1953–1954), in Barranquilla, Colombia (1951–1952), Ootacamund, India (1954–1956) and passed his Abitur in 1959 at the Schiller-Gymnasium in Offenburg.

One of his ancestors was the composer Bernhard Stavenhagen. Lutz Stavenhagen was married since 1965 to the stepdaughter of the former managing director of the Pforzheim Knoll & Pregizer jewelry and watch factories and had two daughters. Stavenhagen's daughter Viktoria Schmid was a member of the state parliament in Baden-Württemberg for the CDU from 2011 to 2016.

== Profession ==
Stavenhagen did his military service in the German Air Force and then started studying business administration and economics at the University of Saarbrücken and the University of Tübingen in 1960, where he graduated with a degree in business administration. In 1968, he received his doctorate with a thesis on problems of price formation on the international mineral oil market.

From 1964, Stavenhagen worked as an assistant manager for the Oest Group in Freudenstadt, and between 1967 and 1969 as personnel manager of the German branch of Hobart Maschinen GmbH of the U.S. Hobart Group in Offenburg, before becoming managing director of Knoll & Pregizer until 1972.

== Political career ==
He had been a member of the CDU since 1964 and later also belonged to the state executive committee of the Baden-Württemberg CDU.

From 1972 until his death, Stavenhagen was a member of the German Bundestag - always as a directly elected member. Most recently, he achieved 46.9% of the first-past-the-post votes in the Pforzheim constituency in the 1990 Bundestag elections.

Following the sudden death of diplomat and Minister of State Alois Mertes, Stavenhagen was appointed Minister of State at the Foreign Office in the German government led by Chancellor Helmut Kohl on 4 September 1985. After the 1987 federal election, Stavenhagen replaced Minister of State Friedrich Vogel and served as Minister of State in the Chancellor's Office from 12 March 1987 to 3 December 1991.

In early December 1990, Stavenhagen, in his capacity as the federal government's commissioner for intelligence, submitted a four-page report "on the stay-behind organization of the Federal Intelligence Service."

As intelligence coordinator, Stavenhagen was not informed in the Federal Chancellery - contrary to the statement of former BND President Hans-Georg Wieck - about "assistance" to Alexander Schalck-Golodkowski from the Federal Intelligence Service "for example, by issuing a passport in the name of 'Gutmann', the maiden name of Mrs. Schalck-Golodkowski" nor about the involvement of the Bundesnachrichtendienst, the Bundeswehr and the Israeli Mossad in deliveries of armaments from the stocks of the former National People's Army of the German Democratic Republic to Israel, among others.

Stavenhagen asked to be dismissed and left office on 2 December 1991.

On 31 May 1992 Stavenhagen died of pneumonia at the age of 52 and was buried in Pforzheim's main cemetery.

A visiting professorship was established in his honor at the Richard Koebner Minerva Center for German History at the Hebrew University of Jerusalem (The Stavenhagen Guest Professorship).
