= Alexsei Zimmer =

German politician (born 1988)

Member of the Landtag of Baden-Württemberg
- Incumbent
- Assumed office 11 May 2026

Personal details
- Born: 1988 (age 37–38)
- Party: Alternative for Germany
- Relatives: Diana Zimmer (sister)

Alexsei Zimmer (born 1988) is a German politician who was elected member of the Landtag of Baden-Württemberg in 2026. He is the brother of Diana Zimmer.
