= Katja Mast =

German politician

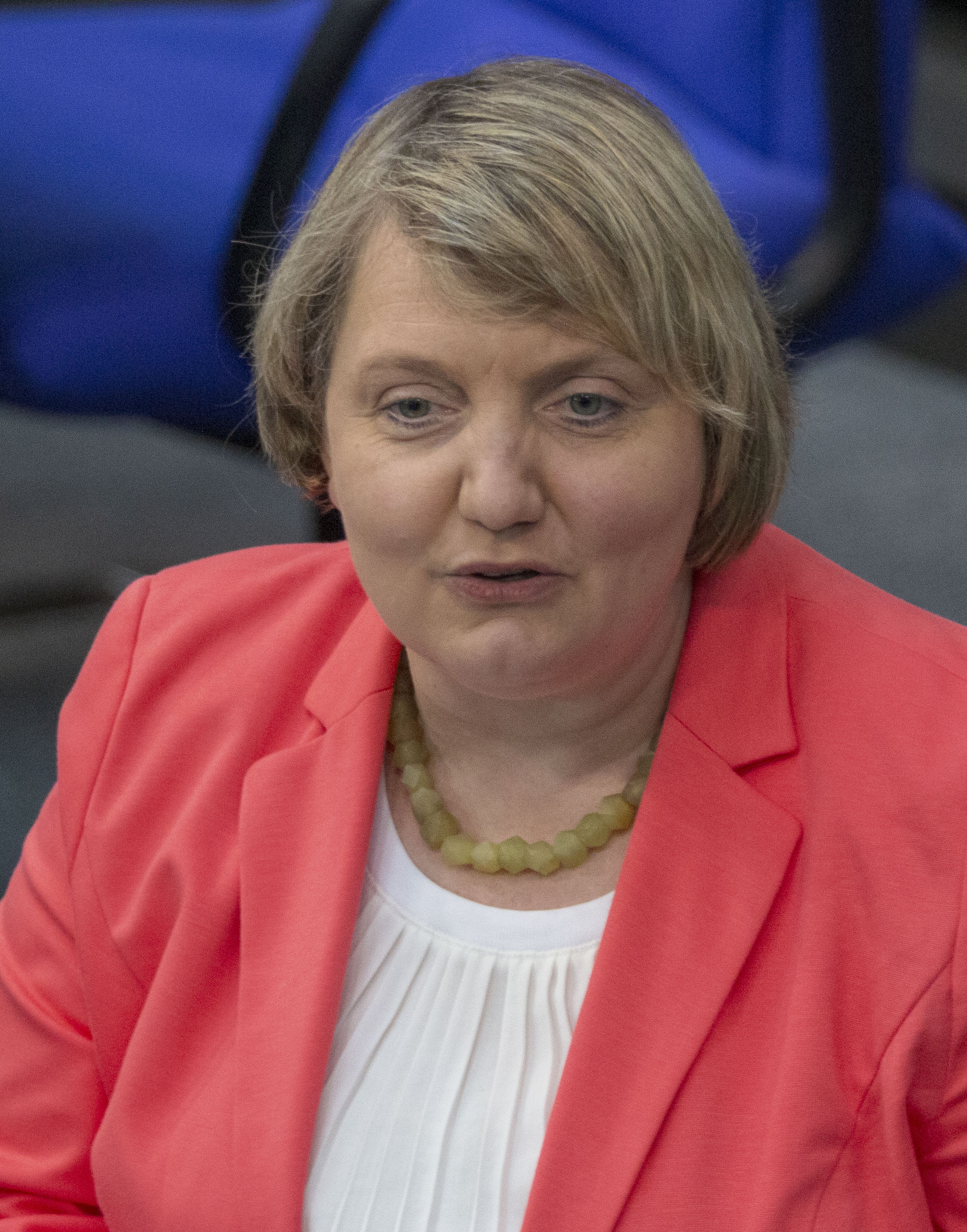
- Mast in 2020

Chief Whip of the SPD Group in the Bundestag
- In office 9 December 2021 – 7 May 2025
- Leader: Rolf Mützenich
- Preceded by: Carsten Schneider
- Succeeded by: Dirk Wiese

Member of the Bundestag
- Incumbent
- Assumed office 18 September 2005

Personal details
- Born: 4 February 1971 (age 55) Offenburg, West Germany (now Germany)
- Party: SPD (since 1993)
- Education: University of Heidelberg

Katja Mast (born 4 February 1971) is a German politician of the SPD who has been serving as a member of the Bundestag from the state of Baden-Württemberg since 2005.

In addition to her work in parliament, Mast has been serving as a Parliamentary State Secretary at the Federal Ministry of Labour and Social Affairs in the government of Chancellor Friedrich Merz since 2025.

== Early career ==
Before entering politics, Mast worked in human resources at Deutsche Bahn from 2003 to 2005.

== Political career ==
=== Early beginnings ===
Mast joined the SPD in 1993.

=== Member of the German Parliament, 2005–present ===
Mast became a member of the Bundestag in the 2005 German federal election, representing the Pforzheim district. From 2005 to 2017, she served on the Committee on Labour and Social Affairs. From 2017 until 2021, she served as one of her parliamentary group's deputy chairs, under the leadership of successive chairs Andrea Nahles (2017–2019) and Rolf Mützenich (2019–2021).

From 2022 to 2025, Mast was the group's chief whip and – in this capacity – served on the Mediation Committee as well as the Committee on the Election of Judges (Wahlausschuss), which is in charge of appointing judges to the Federal Constitutional Court of Germany.

In addition to her parliamentary work, Mast served as secretary general of the SPD in Baden-Württemberg from 2011 to 2016, under the leadership of chairman Nils Schmid.

In the negotiations to form a so-called traffic light coalition of the SPD, the Green Party and the Free Democrats (FDP) following the 2021 German elections, Mast was part of her party's delegation in the working group on social policy, co-chaired by Dagmar Schmidt, Sven Lehmann and Johannes Vogel.

== Other activities ==
- IG Bergbau, Chemie, Energie (IG BCE), Member
- Railway and Transport Union (EVG), Member
