= Stephanie Aeffner =

German politician (1976–2025)

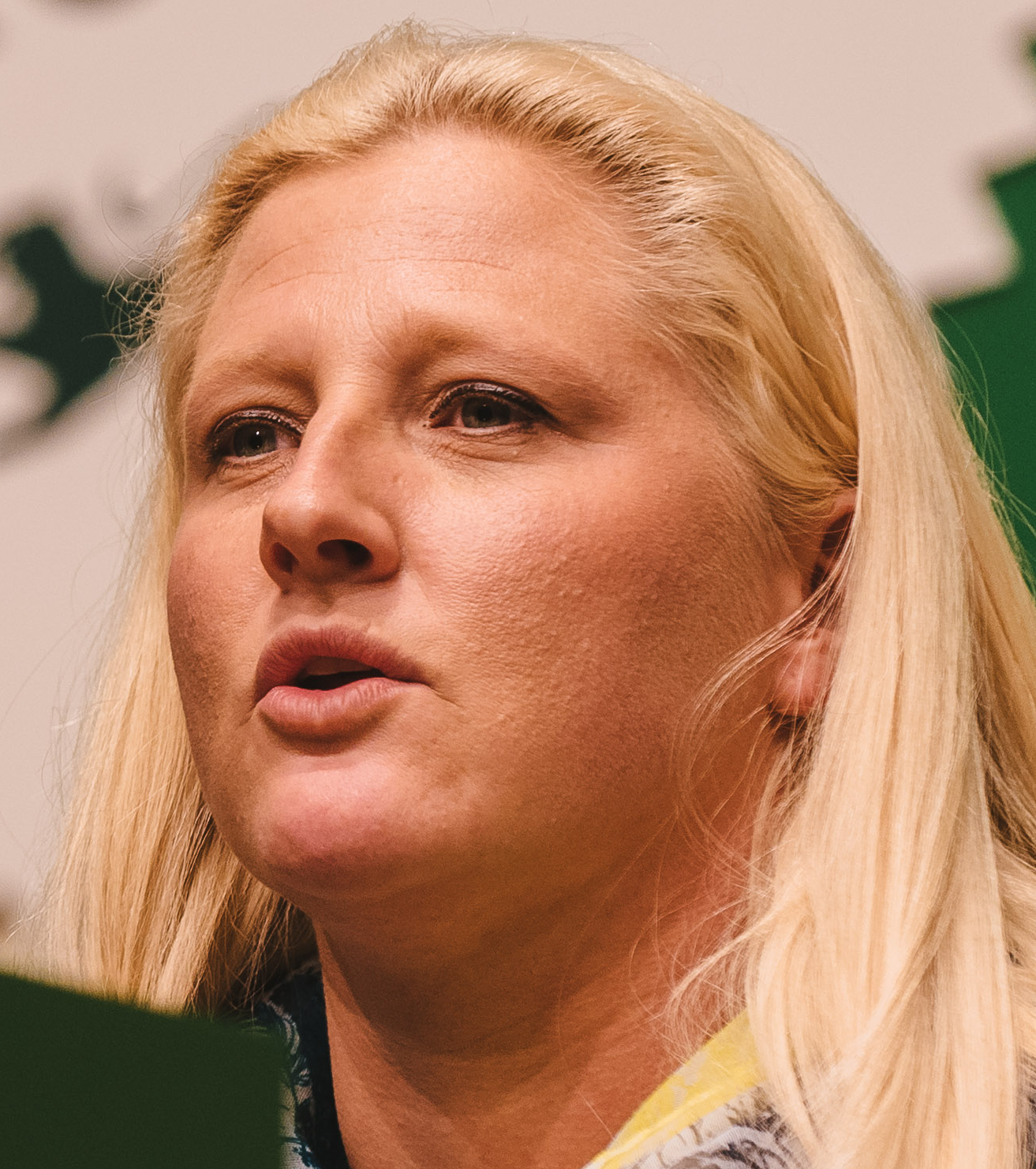

Member of the Bundestag for Baden-Württemberg
- In office 26 October 2021 – 15 January 2025
- Preceded by: Multi-member district
- Succeeded by: Johannes Kretschmann
- Constituency: Alliance 90/The Greens List

Personal details
- Born: 29 April 1976 Donaueschingen, Baden-Württemberg, West Germany
- Died: 15 January 2025 (aged 48)
- Party: Greens

Stephanie Aeffner (29 April 1976 – 15 January 2025) was a German politician from Alliance 90/The Greens who served as a Member of the Bundestag from 2021 until her death. She served on the parliament's Committee on Labour and Social Affairs and on the Advisory Board on Sustainable Development. As an affected person, she advocated for the interests of people with disabilities.

== Early life ==
Aeffner grew up in Frankfurt. After graduating from the Friedrich-Dessauer-Gymnasium in 1995, Aeffner began studying medicine but had to drop out after four years for health reasons. Aeffner was dependent on a wheelchair from 1999 onwards.

== Medical career ==
In 2000, Aeffner began studying social pedagogy at the Heidelberg University of Applied Sciences, which she completed in 2006 as a qualified social worker. She was a temporary worker in outpatient nursing, becoming quality manager in the Clinic for Surgery at the University Hospital Mannheim in 2006.

In 2010, she began training as a quality officer in the social and healthcare sector at the Academy for Economic and Social Management of the F+U Unternehmensgruppe. Until 2012, Aeffner worked in the integration project group in Eppelheim. Since 2012, she was involved in the LAG Behindertenpolitik in Baden-Württemberg. From May 2012, she worked for the Zentrum selbstbestimmt Leben Stuttgart, an advice centre for people with disabilities. There she provided counselling for people with disabilities and their relatives. She was also responsible for the development and implementation of inclusion projects, for which she was involved in various city and state committees such as the Stuttgart Inclusion Advisory Board.

From 2016 to 2021, Aeffner was the representative of the state government of Baden-Württemberg for the interests of people with disabilities.

== Political career ==
Aeffner was a long-standing member of Alliance 90/The Greens. She was a member of the local executive committee of the Eppelheim Greens and the executive committee of the Kurpfalz-Hardt district organisation. She was also a member of the state executive committee of Bündnis 90/Die Grünen Baden-Württemberg. When she was appointed state commissioner for disabled people, she resigned from all party-political offices for reasons of neutrality. She was involved in several state working groups of the Greens in Baden-Württemberg (Economy, Finance and Social Affairs, Disability Policy, Education) and the Federal Working Group (BAG) Disability Policy. She was also a member of the specialist working group on the state election programme and the 2021 Green-Black coalition agreement in Baden-Württemberg.

In the 2021 German federal election, Aeffner contested Pforzheim. She received 12.7% of the first votes and came in fourth place, but was elected to the Bundestag on the state list. In the negotiations to form a so-called traffic light coalition, she was part of her party's delegation in the working group on social policy, co-chaired by Dagmar Schmidt, Sven Lehmann and Johannes Vogel.

In parliament, Aeffner served on the Committee on Labour and Social Affairs and the Parliamentary Advisory Board on Sustainable Development and was the rapporteur for her group.

On 3 June 2022, she was one of four members of the Green parliamentary group in the German Bundestag to vote against the Bundeswehr special fund.

Before her death, she was nominated for Pforzheim again and was in 15th place on the Baden-Württemberg state list of the Greens for the upcoming 2025 German federal election. In January, her seat was taken up by Johannes Kretschmann.

== Personal life ==
Aeffner was a Protestant and, by her own account, single. She lived in Eppelheim. Aeffner died on 15 January 2025, at the age of 48.
