= Georg Baur (politician) =

German politician (1895–1975)

Member of the Bundestag; for Göppingen
- In office 7 September 1949 – 7 September 1953
- Preceded by: Constituency established
- Succeeded by: Hermann Finckh

Personal details
- Born: 2 April 1895 Dischingen, Germany
- Died: 1 April 1975 (aged 79) Rottweil, Baden-Württemberg, Germany
- Party: Christian Democratic Union
- Education: University of Hohenheim
- Occupation: University lecturer

Georg Baur (2 April 1895 – 1 April 1975) was a German politician of the Christian Democratic Union (CDU) and former member of the German Bundestag.

== Career ==
Baur became co-founder of the CDU in Donzdorf and was also elected as its chairman in the Göppingen district council. In 1948, he became a member of the Economic Council for the United Economic Area and remained so until 1949, when he was elected to the Bundestag for the constituency (Göppingen) in the 1949 federal election. He was a full member of the Committee for Cultural Policy and also a deputy member of other committees. After his retirement from the Bundestag after the 1953 federal elections, he became chairman of the North Württemberg Agricultural Committee. From 1956 to 1960 he was a member of the state parliament of Baden-Württemberg for one legislative period.

== Literature ==
Herbst, Ludolf; Jahn, Bruno (2002). Vierhaus, Rudolf (ed.). Biographisches Handbuch der Mitglieder des Deutschen Bundestages. 1949–2002 [Biographical Handbook of the Members of the German Bundestag. 1949–2002] (in German). München: De Gruyter - De Gruyter Saur. p. 1715. ISBN 978-3-11-184511-1.
