= FC Bundestag =

German football club

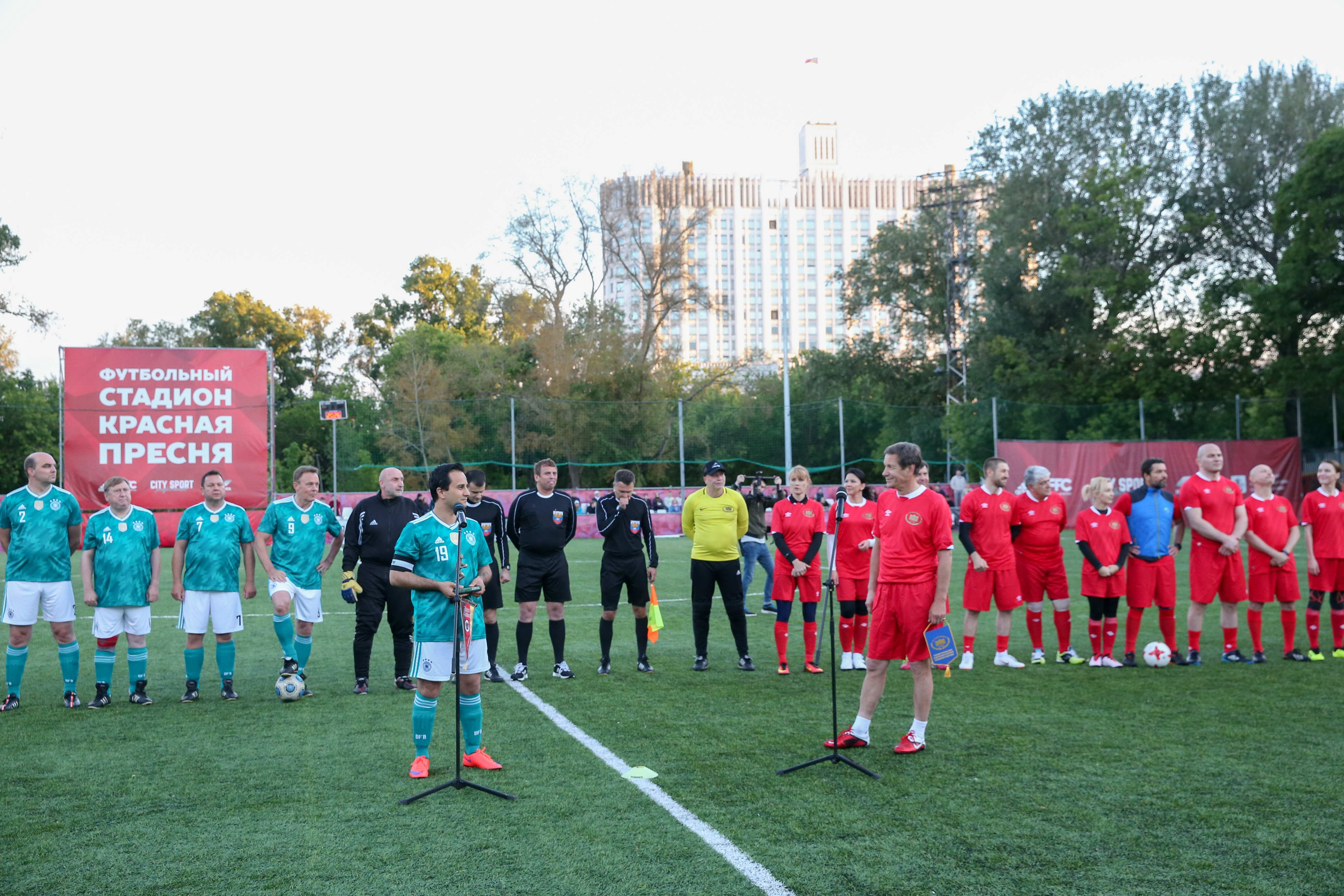
Friendly football match between the teams of the Russian State Duma and the German Bundestag.

FC Bundestag e.V. is a soccer team made up of former and current male and female members of the German Bundestag. It is part of the Sportgemeinschaft Deutscher Bundestag e. V.. In addition to games against other parliamentary selections, the team competes against various amateur teams for the benefit of charitable causes. The prerequisite for the players of the opposing team is a minimum age of 40.

== History ==
A selection of German parliamentarians took to the pitch for the first time in 1961 in a charity match for social causes against a selection of celebrities, reinforced at the time by Fritz Walter. After a few more games of this kind, a soccer team of the Bundestag was initiated in 1967 under the leadership of Adolf Müller-Emmert, which from then on met regularly for joint training. Müller-Emmert commented on this at the time, saying "soccer is the only joy we have in Bonn."

The first international soccer match against another parliamentary selection took place in 1971 against Switzerland. This led to an annual International Parliamentary Football Tournament, also known as the unofficial European Championship of Parliamentary Teams. For decades, the FC Bundestag as well as selection teams from Austria, Switzerland and Finland have participated in the tournament. The latter have so far finished the tournament as winners most often. 2022 was the last time the German selection managed to win this tournament. In 2013, FC Bundestag finished second and in 2014 in Vienna, fourth.

At the general meeting on 20 January 2018, FC Bundestag for the first time rejected the application for admission of a member of the Bundestag. It was the application of Alternative for Germany (AfD) parliamentarian Sebastian Münzenmaier. The application for admission of Hansjörg Müller was "deferred". AfD politicians Jörn König and Wolfgang Wiehle were accepted into the team, but did not appear once at training until June 2018. In May 2018 - after a conversation between Müller and members Stephan Kühn and Mahmut Özdemir - Hansjörg Müller's application for membership was also rejected.

Training and most matches take place at the Friedrich-Ludwig-Jahn-Sportpark. With the permission of the German Football Association, FC Bundestag competes in the official jerseys of the Germany national football team.

== Reception ==
Longtime team captain Klaus Riegert, who played over 300 games for FC Bundestag, considers the team "the most successful faction in the Bundestag" and suspects that one of the recipes for success is that "everyone is the same in the shower."

In March 2012, rumors arose that Otto Rehhagel, who at the time was trying to save Hertha BSC from relegation to the second Bundesliga, had been persuaded by Thomas Oppermann to additionally coach FC Bundestag. According to corresponding media reports, both made it clear that Rehhagel would initially concentrate exclusively on his duties as Hertha coach and would be available as a guest coach at a later date.

== Current players ==
As of 16 May 2020, the squad has a size of 77 players, of which about half (37) are members of the CDU/CSU parliamentary group. The captain is Fritz Güntzler (CDU) and vice-captain is Mahmut Özdemir (SPD).

Few players from the Bündnis 90/Die Grünen parliamentary group, which has its own soccer team, the Green Tulip, are represented.

== Former notable players ==
Among the most famous former players are Helmut Kohl, Joschka Fischer (scoreless), Oskar Lafontaine, Rudolf Scharping, Peter Struck (3 goals), Klaus Töpfer, Theo Waigel (3 goals) and Michael Grosse-Brömer (14 goals).
