= Johannes Kretschmann =

German politician

Member of the Bundestag
- In office 27 January 2025 – March 2025

Personal details
- Born: 14 July 1978 (age 48) Ostfildern, West Germany
- Party: Alliance 90/The Greens
- Parent: Winfried Kretschmann (father)
- Education: Free University of Berlin; Humboldt University of Berlin
- Occupation: Freelance artist

Johannes Friedrich Kretschmann (born 14 July 1978) is a German politician from the Alliance 90/The Greens. He was briefly a member of the German Bundestag in 2025.

== Life ==
Johannes Kretschmann grew up as the second of three children of the later Prime Minister of Baden-Württemberg Winfried Kretschmann and his wife Gerlinde, first in Leinfelden-Echterdingen and from 1984 in the Sigmaringen district of Laiz. In 1998 he graduated from the Hohenzollern-Gymnasium Sigmaringen. From 1998 to 2009 he studied religious studies, Romanian studies and linguistics at the Free University of Berlin and the Humboldt University of Berlin. He graduated with a Magister Artium. From 2008 to 2010 he was an opening act at hart aber fair, then a moster at Tübingen and from 2011 to 2012 a pallbearer at a funeral home. From 2011 to 2019 he worked as an online editor forthe Swiss online newspaper bluewin.ch. From February to May 2022, he worked as a clerk for Anja Reinalter, member of the Bundestag.

Kretschmann works as a freelance cultural worker. He is committed to preserving the dialect of Swabian German. He has been a volunteer dialect consultant to the Baden-Württemberg state government since 2019 and a member of the advisory board of the Center for Dialect at the Weingarten University of Education|de|Pädagogische Hochschule Weingarten since 2020. He lives in Laiz.

Kretschmann was initially Roman Catholic, but later left the church.

== Political career ==
Kretschmann built up a local group of the Green-Alternative Youth in Sigmaringen in 1994. In 1999 he joined the Greens. Since 2014 he has been a member of the district council of the Sigmaringen district, and since 2019 he has been chairman of the local Green parliamentary group.

In the 2021 German federal election, Kretschmann ran in the Zollernalb – Sigmaringen constituency and was ranked 21st on the Green Party's state list. On 27 January 2025, he replaced the MP Stephanie Aeffner in the Bundestag for the remaining few weeks of the legislative period after her death. He did not stand in the 2025 German federal election.

== Writings ==
- Antisemitismus und magisches Denken. Nomos Verlag, Baden-Baden 2010, ISBN 978-3-8288-2460-7.
- gemeinsam mit Johannes Berreth und Dennis Dreher: Neigschmeggd: Schwäbisch vegan. Gräfe und Unzer, München 2023, ISBN 978-3-8338-8844-1.
