= Rainer Semet =

German politician (born 1957)

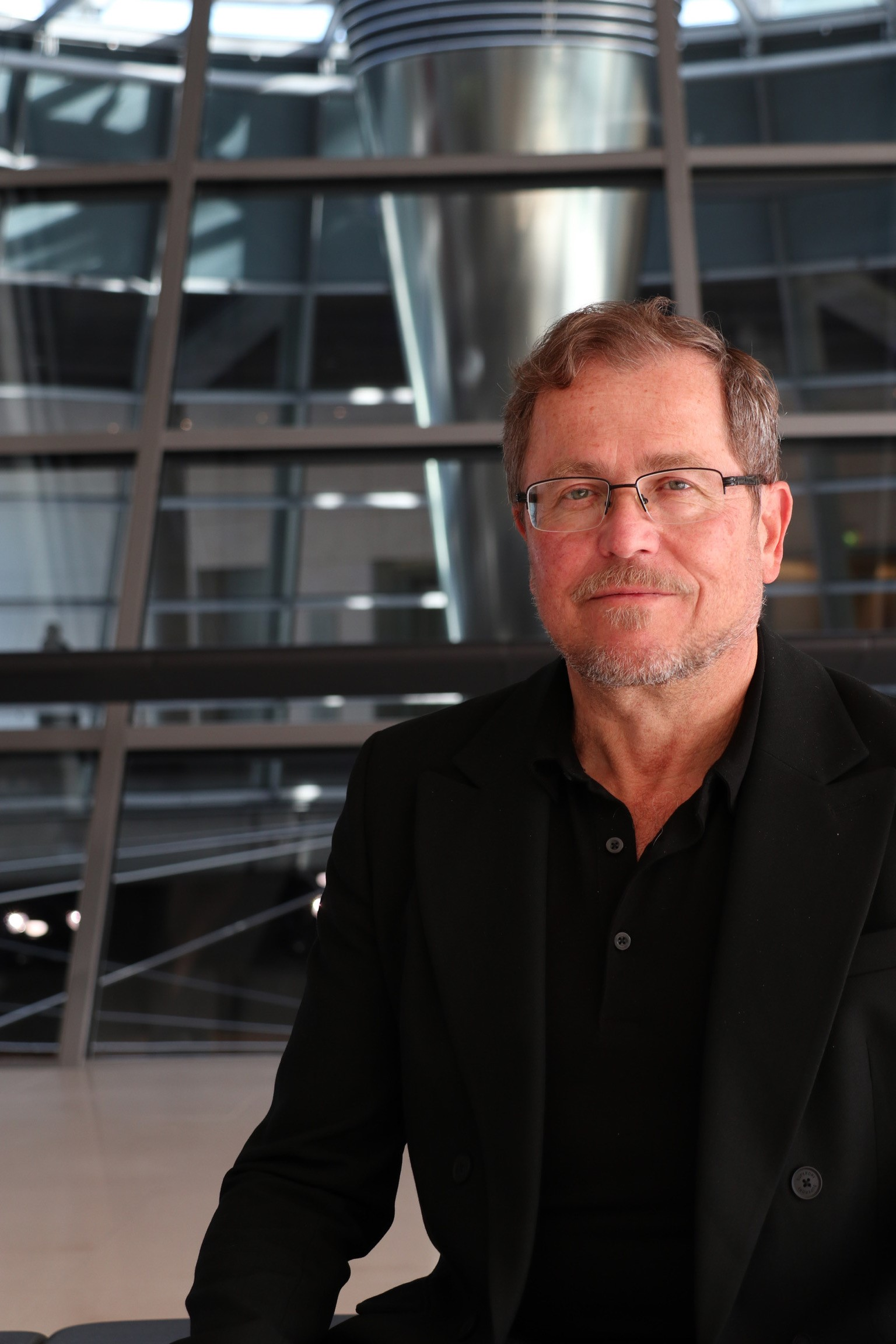

Member of the Bundestag
- In office German Bundestag in 2021 – German Bundestag in 2025

Personal details
- Born: 4 September 1957 (age 68)
- Party: Free Democratic Party

Rainer Semet (born 4 September 1957) is a German engineer and politician of the Free Democratic Party (FDP) who served as a member of the Bundestag from 2021 to 2025.

== Early life and career ==
Semet was born 1957 in the West German city of Stuttgart. He graduated in engineering management from the Rosenheim University of Applied Sciences and the Berlin University of Applied Sciences and Technology.

== Political career ==
Semet became member of the Bundestag in 2021, representing the Pforzheim district. In parliament, he served on the Committee on Housing, Urban Development, Building and Local Government, the Committee on Foreign Affairs and its Subcommittee on the United Nations, International Organizations and Civil Crisis Prevention.

In addition to his committee assignments, Semet was part of the German-Iranian Parliamentary Friendship Group from 2021 until its dissolution in 2023.
