= Hermann Färber =

German politician (born 1963)

Hermann Färber MdB

Member of the Bundestag; for Göppingen
- Incumbent
- Assumed office 22 September 2013
- Preceded by: Klaus Riegert

Personal details
- Born: 26 March 1963 (age 63) Böhmenkirch, West Germany
- Party: Christian Democratic Union
- Children: 5

Hermann Färber (born 26 March 1963) is a German politician of the Christian Democratic Union (CDU) who has been serving as a member of the Bundestag from the state of Baden-Württemberg since 2013.

== Early life and education ==
Färber completed an apprenticeship as an agricultural machinery mechanic and farmer. He then attended a technical college for agriculture, from which he graduated as a state-certified economist for agriculture. This was followed by the agricultural master craftsman's examination. He managed his family farm for more than 25 years before becoming a member of the Bundestag.

== Political career ==
Färber joined the CDU in 2012, but was already a non-party member of the CDU Göppingen district council group from 2004 to 2009. In the internal party nomination on September 28, 2012, he was elected with 305 to 198 votes as a candidate for the 2013 federal election. In the Bundestag election on September 22, 2013, Färber received 49.04% of the first-past-the-post votes, winning the direct mandate in the Göppingen constituency. He has been a member of the German Bundestag ever since, after being re-elected with 95.8 percent.

In parliament, Färber has been a full member of the Committee on Food and Agriculture, the Committee on the Environment, Nature Conservation and Nuclear Safety, and the Petitions Committee. He is also a deputy member of the Parliamentary Advisory Council for Sustainable Development.

Since 2016 he is it deputy chairman of the CDU district association Göppingen.

Färber is a member of the CDU/CSU parliamentary group in the German Bundestag. In his parliamentary group, he is a member of the working groups on food and agriculture and petitions.

Since 2025, Färber has been serving as chairman of the German Parliament's Committee on Food and Agriculture.

== Political positions ==
In June 2017, Färber voted against Germany's introduction of same-sex marriage.

== Honorary offices and memberships ==
- Chairman of the Göppingen District Farmers' Association since 1999
- Vice chairman of the CDU district association Göppingen
- President of the Hohenstaufen Choir Association
- Member of the Executive Board of the Landesbauernverband in Baden-Württemberg
- Member of the supervisory board of Buchstelle Landesbauernverband Baden-Württemberg GmbH
- Advisory board of the Kreissparkasse Göppingen
- Ambassador of the adventure region Schwäbischer Albtrauf
- Member of the Böhmenkirch volunteer fire department
- Member of the non-partisan Europa-Union Deutschland
