= Diana Zimmer =

German politician (born 1998)

Member of the Bundestag
- Incumbent
- Assumed office 2025
- Constituency: Baden-Württemberg

Chairwoman of the AfD Pforzheim/Enzkreis
- Incumbent
- Assumed office 2022

Member of the Pforzheim City Council
- In office 2019–2025

Personal details
- Born: 9 July 1998 (age 28) Pforzheim, Baden-Württemberg, Germany
- Party: Alternative for Germany
- Relatives: Alexsei Zimmer (brother)
- Occupation: Business economist, politician
- Website: diana-zimmer.de

Diana Zimmer (born 9 July 1998) is a German politician of the Alternative for Germany (AfD). She has been a member of the Bundestag since 2025, representing Baden-Württemberg via the state list.

== Early life and education ==
Zimmer was born on 9 July 1998 in Pforzheim, Baden-Württemberg, and is single. She was born into a family of Russian German Spätaussiedlers, who came to Germany in 1996 (her older brother Alexsei, a Baden-Württemberg Landtag member, was born in Orsk in Russia), settling in Pforzheim, in the southeastern district of Haidach that has a large Russian German population.

She trained as a financial assistant (Finanzassistentin) and studied business administration, earning a Bachelor of Science (B.Sc.) degree in Betriebswirtschaftslehre. She is described as a business economist (Betriebswirtin).

== Career ==
Zimmer worked as a private customer advisor in banking and later as a controller in the real estate sector. She was a member of the supervisory board of SWP Stadtwerke Pforzheim GmbH & Co. KG until April 2025.

== Political career ==
Zimmer joined the AfD in early 2017 at age 18, motivated by dissatisfaction with Angela Merkel's migration and euro policies, which she viewed as working against the majority of the population.

She was elected to the Pforzheim city council in 2019 and served as chairwoman of the AfD fraction there from January 2022 until stepping down after her election to the Bundestag in 2025.

Since 2022, she has been chairwoman of the AfD district association (Kreisverband) Pforzheim/Enzkreis, a position reconfirmed in October 2025. In February 2024, she became a member (Beisitzerin) of the AfD state executive board in Baden-Württemberg.

In the 2025 German federal election, Zimmer was elected to the Bundestag via the Baden-Württemberg state list (associated with the Pforzheim constituency). She is a full member of the Finance Committee (Finanzausschuss) and a substitute member of the Foreign Affairs Committee (Ausschuss für Auswärtige Angelegenheiten). She also serves as deputy chairwoman of the German-French Parliamentary Friendship Group.

Zimmer has participated in parliamentary debates, including speeches criticizing inheritance tax proposals, debt-financed policies, and left-wing initiatives on fiscal matters.

== Political positions ==
Zimmer advocates strict measures against illegal migration, fiscal conservatism, reduced EU bureaucracy, performance-based policies, and a "Germany first" approach. She opposes high inheritance taxes, particularly on family businesses, and criticizes identity politics and redistribution policies.

== Personal life ==
Zimmer maintains an active online presence on Instagram (@diana_zimmer98 ), Facebook (@zimmerdiana .afd), and X (@DianaZimmerMdB ).
