= Klaus Riegert =

German politician (born 1959)

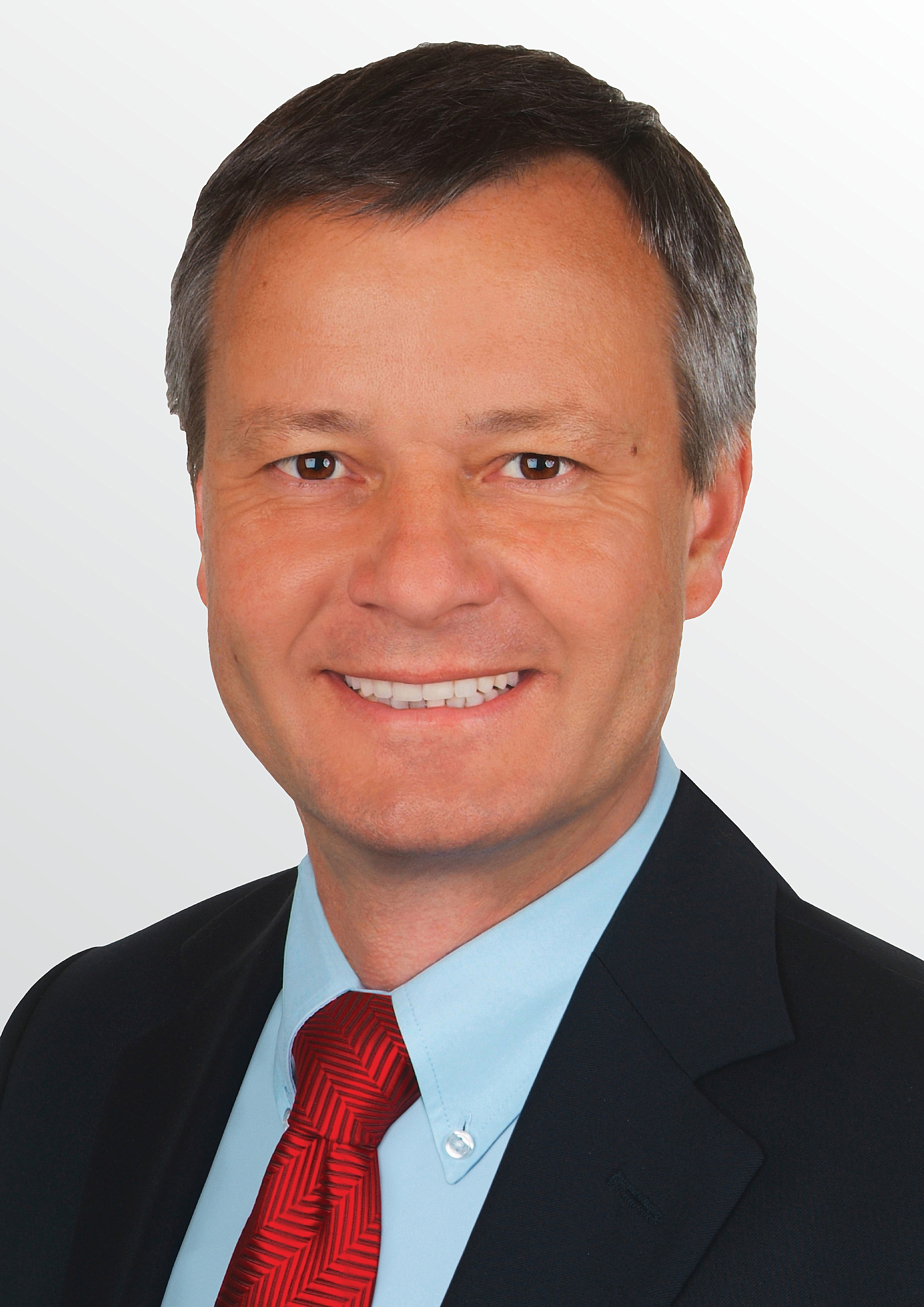
- Riegert in 2012

Member of the Bundestag
- In office 10 June 1992 – 22 October 2013
- Preceded by: Lutz Stavenhagen
- Succeeded by: Hermann Färber
- Constituency: Pforzheim (1992–1994); Göppingen (1994–2013)

Personal details
- Born: 26 February 1959 (age 67) Süßen, Göppingen, West Germany
- Party: Christian Democratic Union
- Awards: German Order of Merit (2008)

Klaus Riegert (born 26 February 1959) is a German politician.

Until 2013, he was deputy chairman of the Subcommittee on Civic Involvement of the Committee on Family Affairs, Senior Citizens, Women and Youth of the German Bundestag and chairman of the Working Group on Sport and Volunteering of the CDU/CSU parliamentary group in the Bundestag.

== Biography ==
Riegert joined the police service of the state of Baden-Württemberg and, after obtaining his technical college entrance qualification, completed his studies at the Hochschule für Polizei Baden-Württemberg (University of Applied Sciences) in Villingen-Schwenningen, graduating with a Bachelor of Public Administration. Most recently, Riegert was deputy head of the criminal investigation department.

Klaus Riegert is Catholic and married for the second time. He has two children from his first marriage. He lives with his wife in Kirchheim unter Teck.

== Political career ==
Riegert joined the CDU in 1984. He is a member of the executive committee of the North Württemberg district association of the Christian Democratic Employees' Union (CDA).

On 10 June 1992, Riegert succeeded the late Lutz Stavenhagen in the Bundestag. Here he was sports policy spokesman for the CDU/CSU parliamentary group from 1994. Riegert was also deputy chairman of the Subcommittee on Civic Involvement of the Committee on Family Affairs, Senior Citizens, Women and Youth and chairman of the Working Group on Sport and Volunteering of the CDU/CSU parliamentary group. Riegert was also the captain of FC Bundestag, the soccer team of the German Bundestag.

Klaus Riegert entered the Bundestag in 1992 via the Baden-Württemberg state list and thereafter always as a directly elected member of parliament for the constituency of Göppingen. In the 2005 German federal election, he achieved 48.3% of the first-past-the-post votes here. In the 2009 federal election, he achieved 43.1% of the vote in his constituency and again entered the Bundestag as a direct candidate. For the 2013 federal election, he was no longer elected by his district association as a direct candidate, instead the delegates nominated Hermann Färber.
