= Erik Schweickert =

German politician (born 1972)

Member of the Bundestag
- In office 27 October 2009 – 22 October 2013
- Constituency: Baden-Württemberg

Personal details
- Born: 2 June 1972 (age 53) Pforzheim
- Party: Free Democratic Party

Erik Schweickert (born 2 June 1972 in Pforzheim) is a German politician serving as a member of the Landtag of Baden-Württemberg since 2016. From 2009 to 2013, he was a member of the Bundestag.
