= German Russian =

German-Russian (German Russian) or Russian-German (Russian German) may refer to:

- Germany–Russia relations
- People with multiple citizenship of Germany and Russia
- Russians in Germany
- Ethnic Germans in the Russian Empire, Soviet Union, or present-day Russia:
  - Russia Germans
  - Baltic Germans
  - Black Sea Germans
  - Caucasus Germans
  - Crimea Germans
  - Volga Germans
  - Volhynian Germans
- Russian Mennonites
