= Sascha Binder =

German politician (born 1983)

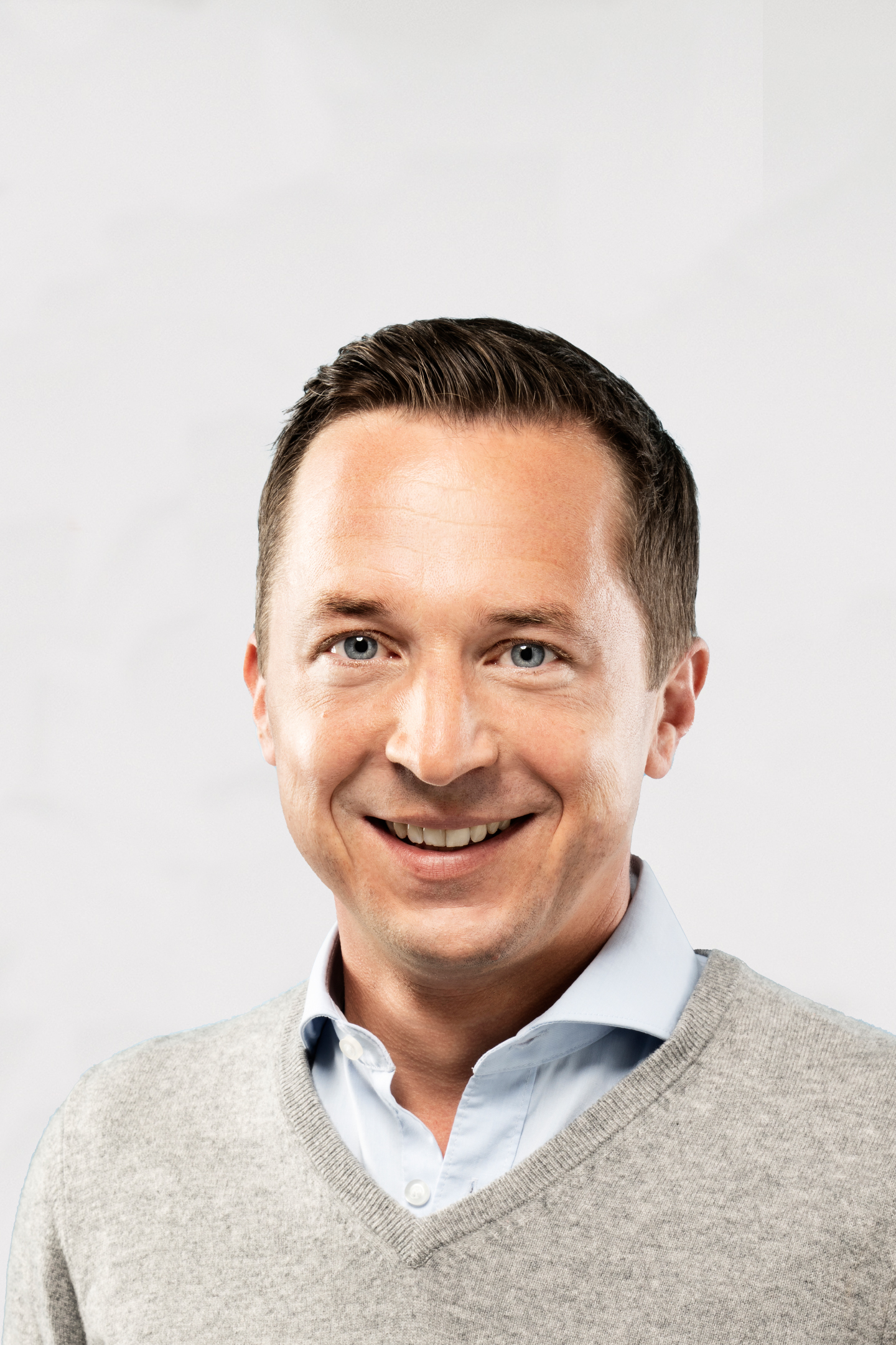
- Binder in 2021

Member of the Landtag of Baden-Württemberg
- Incumbent
- Assumed office 1 May 2011

Personal details
- Born: 4 March 1983 (age 43)
- Party: Social Democratic Party

Sascha Binder (born 4 March 1983) is a German politician serving as a member of the Landtag of Baden-Württemberg since 2011. He has served as secretary general of the Social Democratic Party of Baden-Württemberg since 2018. He also serves as his party's chief whip in the Landtag since 2021.
