= Ute Vogt =

German politician (born 1964)

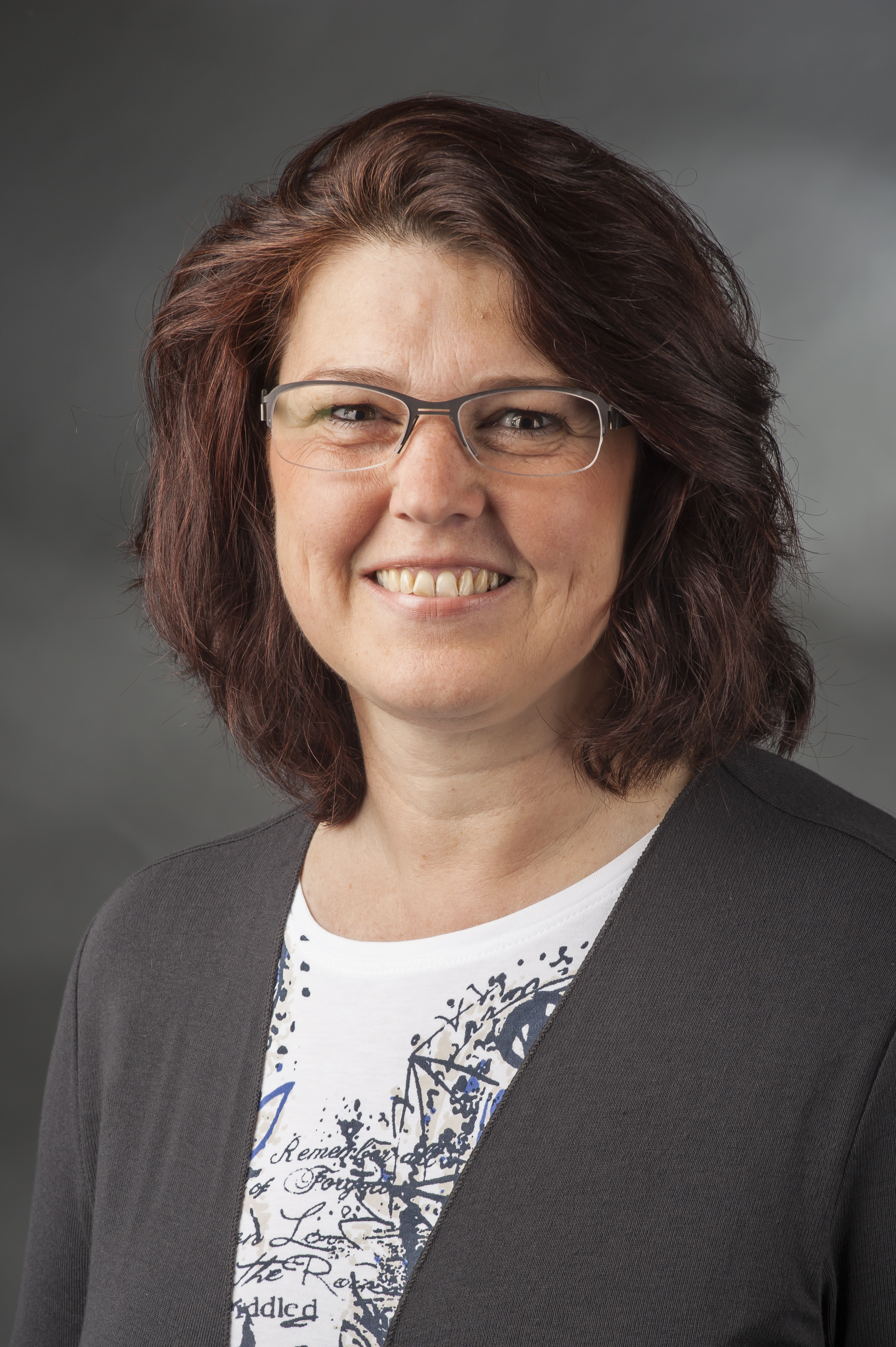
- Vogt in 2014

Member of the Bundestag; from Baden-Württemberg
- In office 27 October 2009 – 26 October 2021
- Constituency: State list
- In office 10 November 1994 – 18 October 2005
- Constituency: State list (1994–1998); Pforzheim (1998–2002); State list (2002–2005)

Member of the; Landtag of Baden-Württemberg; for Bretten
- In office 13 June 2006 – 30 September 2009
- Preceded by: Peter Wintruff
- Succeeded by: Wolfgang Wehowsky

Personal details
- Born: 3 October 1964 (age 62) Heidelberg, West Germany
- Party: Social Democratic
- Education: Heidelberg University; German University of Administrative Sciences

Ute Vogt (born 3 October 1964) is a German lawyer and politician of the Social Democratic Party (SPD) who served as a member of the Bundestag from 1994 to 2005 and from 2009 to 2021. Since 2021, she has been serving as president of the German Life Saving Association (DLRG).

== Early life and education ==
Vogt was born in 1964 in Heidelberg. She studied at Heidelberg University and at the German University of Administrative Sciences, Speyer, and became a lawyer.

== Political career ==
Vogt joined the Social Democratic Party (SPD) in 1984 and became a city councillor in Wiesloch from 1989 until 1994.

Vogt was first elected to the Bundestag in 1994, representing Pforzheim. In parliament, she was a member of the Committee on Internal Affairs (1994–2001) and the Committee on Postal Services and Telecommunications (1998–2001). From 1999 until 2001, she also served on the parliamentary body in charge of appointing judges to the Highest Courts of Justice, namely the Federal Court of Justice (BGH), the Federal Administrative Court (BVerwG), the Federal Fiscal Court (BFH), the Federal Labour Court (BAG), and the Federal Social Court (BSG). In 2000, she became the first woman to chair the Committee on Internal Affairs.

On the state level, Vogt was elected chairwoman of the SPD in Baden-Württemberg in 1999, leading the party’s campaign for the 2001 state elections and unsuccessfully attempting to unseat incumbent Minister-President Erwin Teufel.

From 2001 until 2005 elections, Vogt served alongside Fritz Rudolf Körper as Parliamentary State Secretary in the Federal Ministry of the Interior under minister Otto Schily in the government of Chancellor Gerhard Schröder.

Also on the national level, Vogt was one of the deputy chairs of the SPD from 2003 until 2007, under the leadership of successive chairmen Schröder (2003–2004), Franz Müntefering (2004–2005), Matthias Platzeck (2005–2006) and Kurt Beck (2006–2007).

When the Schröder government was voted out of office in 2005, Vogt returned to state politics and became her party’s candidate to challenge Minister-President Günther Oettinger in Baden-Württemberg’s 2006 elections. From 2006 until 2008, she chaired her parliamentary group in the Landtag of Baden-Württemberg. She resigned as the party’s chairwoman in the state after disappointing results in the 2009 German federal election and was replaced by Nils Schmid.

Vogt returned to the Bundestag in the 2009 elections, this time representing Stuttgart. In parliament, she joined the Committee on the Environment, Nature Conservation and Nuclear Safety as well as a parliamentary inquiry into the Gorleben salt dome, a controversial proposed deep geological repository for radioactive waste.

In the negotiations to form a Grand Coalition of the Christian Democrats (CDU together with the Bavarian CSU) and the SPD following the 2013 federal elections, Vogt led the SPD delegation in the working group on the environment and agriculture; her co-chair from the Christian Democrats was Katherina Reiche. She subsequently served as deputy chairwoman of the SPD parliamentary group under the leadership of chairman Thomas Oppermann from 2013 until 2017. In this capacity, she was one of the members of the country's temporary National Commission on the Disposal of Radioactive Waste from 2014 to 2016, chaired by Ursula Heinen-Esser and Michael Müller. From 2015 until 2016, she was part of a government-appointed commission tasked with recommending how to safeguard the funding of fulfilling Germany's exit from nuclear energy, under the leadership of co-chairs Ole von Beust, Matthias Platzeck and Jürgen Trittin.

Vogt later served as a member of the Committee on Economic Cooperation and Development (2018–2019) and again of the Committee on Internal Affairs (2019–2021). In October 2020, she announced that she would not stand in the 2021 federal elections but instead resign from active politics by the end of the parliamentary term.

== Other activities ==
- German Foundation for Active Citizenship and Volunteering (DSEE), Member of the Board of Trustees (since 2022)
- Business Forum of the Social Democratic Party of Germany, Member of the Political Advisory Board (since 2018)
- German Committee for UNICEF, Member of the Board (since 2018)
- German Foundation for World Population (DSW), Member of the Parliamentary Advisory Board (–2021)
- German Life Saving Association (DLRG), Member
- Eurosolar, Member
- German United Services Trade Union (ver.di), Member
