= 2001 Baden-Württemberg state election =

State election in Germany

- 25 March 2001

All 128 seats in the Landtag of Baden-Württemberg 65 seats needed for a majority
- Turnout: 4,530,763 (62.6%) ▼5.0%
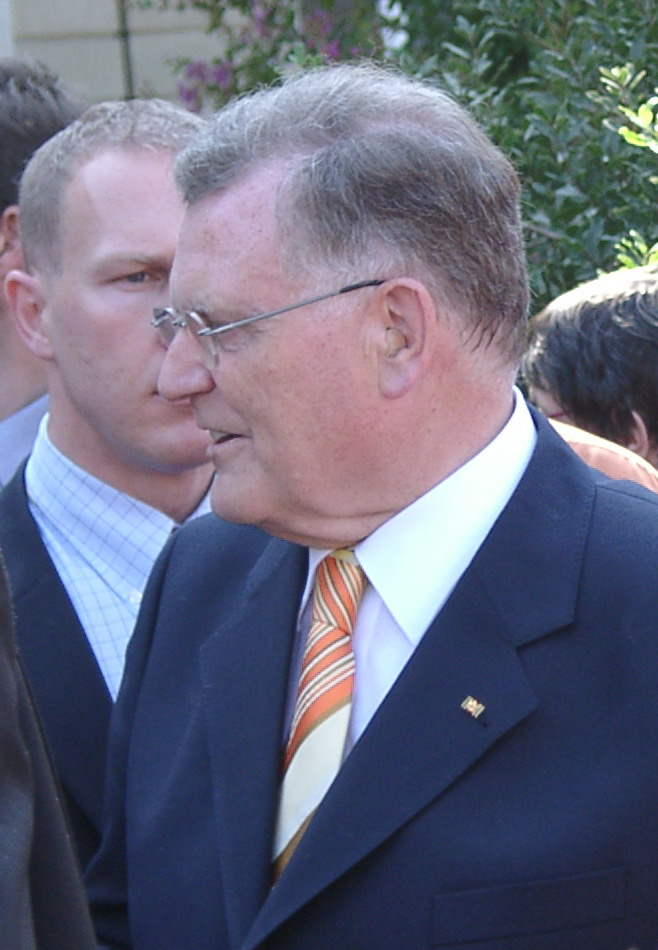

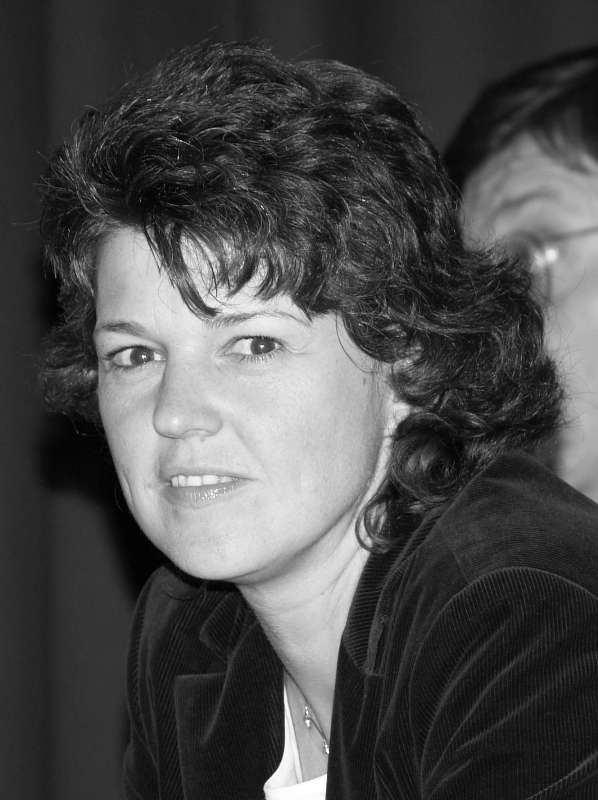

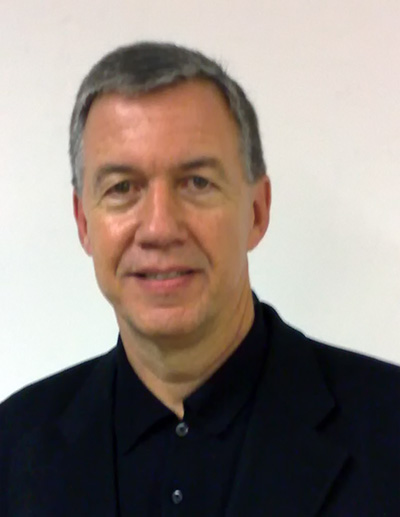

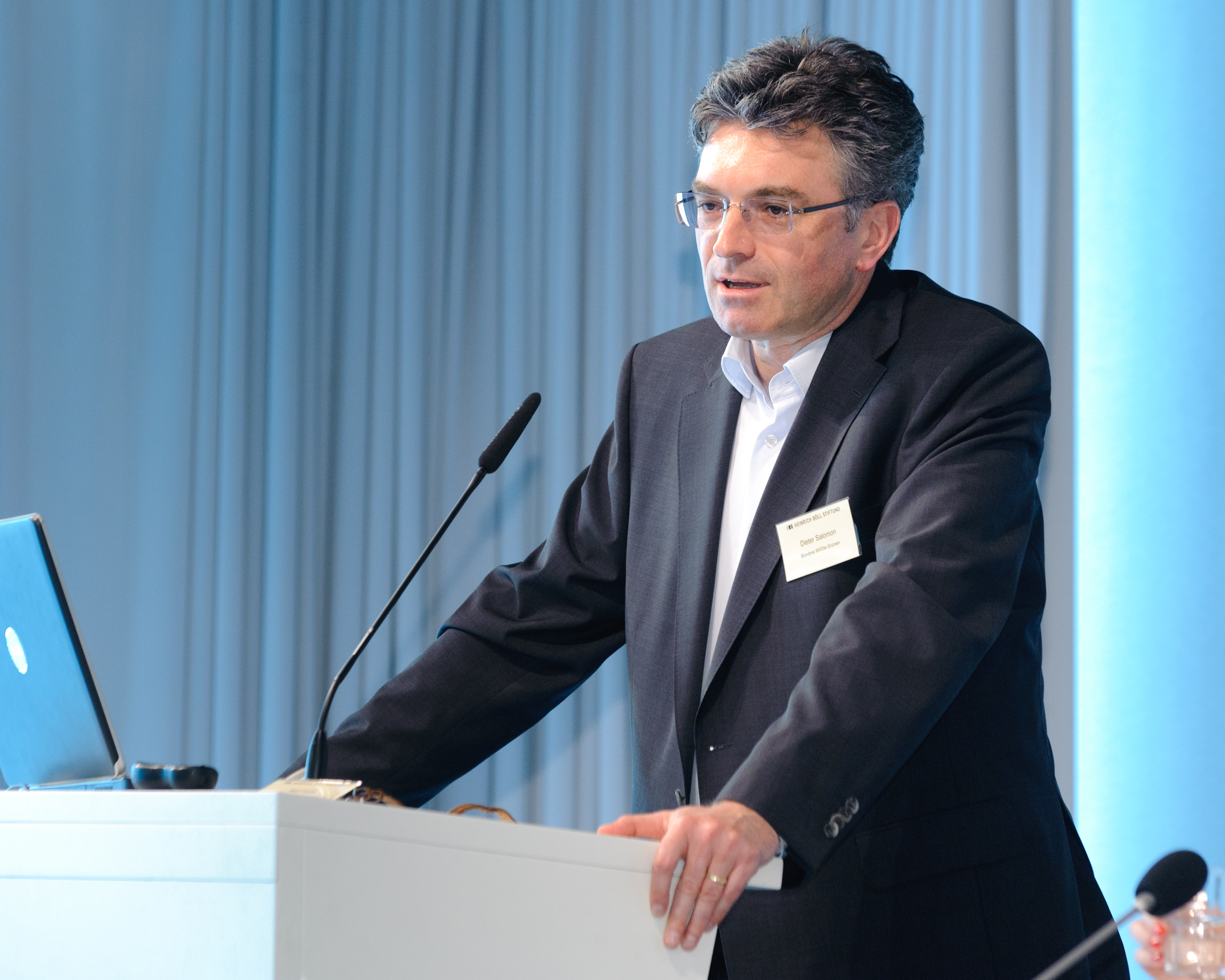
	First party	Second party
Leader	Erwin Teufel	Ute Vogt
Party	CDU	SPD
Last election	69 seats, 41.3%	39 seats, 25.1%
Seats won	63	45
Seat change	▼6	▲6
Popular vote	2,029,806	1,508,358
Percentage	44.8%	33.3%
Swing	▲3.5%	▲8.2%
	Third party	Fourth party
Leader	Walter Döring	Dieter Salomon
Party	FDP	Greens
Last election	14 seats, 9.6%	19 seats, 12.1%
Seats won	10	10
Seat change	▼4	▼9
Popular vote	367,580	350,383
Percentage	8.1%	7.7%
Swing	▼1.5%	▼4.4%
- Results for the single-member constituencies.
Minister-President before election
Erwin Teufel
CDU
Elected Minister-President
Erwin Teufel
CDU

The 2001 Baden-Württemberg state election was held on 25 March 2001 to elect the members of the 12th Landtag of Baden-Württemberg. The incumbent coalition government of the Christian Democratic Union (CDU) and Free Democratic Party (FDP) under Minister-President Erwin Teufel was re-elected with an increased majority and continued in office.

== Parties ==
The table below lists parties represented in the previous Landtag of Baden-Württemberg.

Name		Ideology	Leader(s)	1996 result	
Name		Ideology	Leader(s)	Votes (%)	Seats
CDU	Christian Democratic Union of Germany; Christlich Demokratische Union Deutschlands	Christian democracy	Erwin Teufel	41.3%	69 / 155
SPD	Social Democratic Party of Germany; Sozialdemokratische Partei Deutschlands	Social democracy	Ute Vogt	25.1%	39 / 155
Grüne	Alliance 90/The Greens; Bündnis 90/Die Grünen	Green politics	Dieter Saloman	12.1%	19 / 155
FDP	Free Democratic Party; Freie Demokratische Partei	Classical liberalism	Walter Döring	9.6%	14 / 155
REP	The Republicans; Die Republikaner	German nationalism		9.1%	14 / 155

== Opinion polling ==
Polling firm	Fieldwork date	Sample size	CDU	SPD	Grüne	FDP	REP	Others	Lead
2001 state election	25 Mar 2001	–	44.8	33.3	7.7	8.1	4.4	1.7	10.2
Forsa	12–17 Mar 2001	–	41	32	8	9	6	4	9
Infratest dimap	9–14 Mar 2001	1,004	41	35	8.5	8.5	5	2	6
Forschungsgruppe Wahlen	5–8 Mar 2001	1,010	41	36	8	8	5	2	5
Infratest dimap	19–24 Feb 2001	1,000	39	35	8	10	5	3	4
Forsa	8–14 Feb 2001	1,018	39	31	10	10	6	4	8
Infratest dimap	18–23 Jan 2001	1,000	40	32	10	10	5	3	8
Infratest dimap	7–13 Dec 2000	1,000	42	32	9	10	4	3	10
Forsa	29 Nov–5 Dec 2000	1,006	40	30	10	10	6	4	10
Infratest dimap	12–17 Oct 2000	1,000	43	32	9	10	3	3	11
Infratest dimap	6–11 Jul 2000	1,000	44	31	9	9	4	3	13
Forsa	29 May–5 Jun 2000	1,001	42	28	8	12	6	4	12
Infratest dimap	5–10 Jan 2000	1,000	45	31	10	8	3	3	14
Infratest dimap	27 Sep–13 Oct 1999	1,000	49	27	9	7	4	4	22
Infratest dimap	27 Apr–19 May 1999	1,000	48	29	9	8	4	2	19
1996 state election	24 Mar 1996	–	41.3	25.1	12.1	9.6	9.1	2.8	16.2

== Results ==
Summary of the 25 March 2001 election results for the Landtag of Baden-Württemberg
Party	Votes	%	+/-	Seats	+/-	Seats %
Christian Democratic Union (CDU)	2,029,806	44.8	▲3.5	63	▼6	49.2
Social Democratic Party (SPD)	1,508,358	33.3	▲8.2	45	▲6	35.1
Free Democratic Party (FDP)	367,580	8.1	▼1.5	10	▼4	7.8
Alliance 90/The Greens (Grüne)	350,383	7.7	▼4.4	10	▼9	7.8
The Republicans (REP)	198,534	4.4	▼4.7	0	▼14	0
Others	76,102	1.7	▼1.1	0	±0	0
Total	4,530,763	100.0		128	▼27	
Voter turnout		62.6	▼5.0			

Popular Vote
CDU	44.80%
SPD	33.29%
F.D.P.	8.11%
B'90/GRÜNE	7.73%
REP	4.38%
Other	1.68%

Landtag seats
CDU	49.22%
SPD	35.16%
F.D.P.	7.81%
B'90/GRÜNE	7.81%

== Sources ==
- The Federal Returning Officer
