= Drackensteiner Hang =

Mountainside in Germany

Coordinates: 48°32′30″N 9°38′54″E

- Mountainside
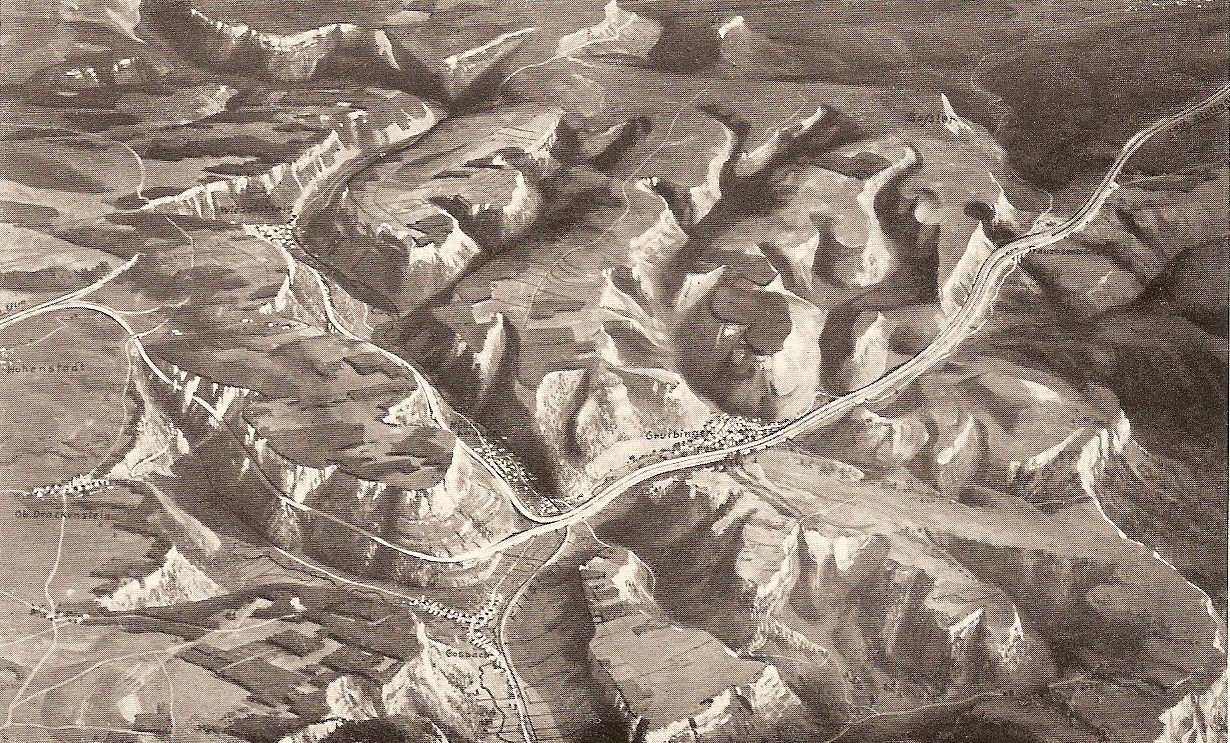
- Relief panorama of Bundesautobahn 8 routes at the Drackensteiner Hang, by Michael Zeno Diemer
- Interactive map of Drackensteiner Hang
- Location: Kirchheim unter Teck, Germany
- Range: Swabian Alps

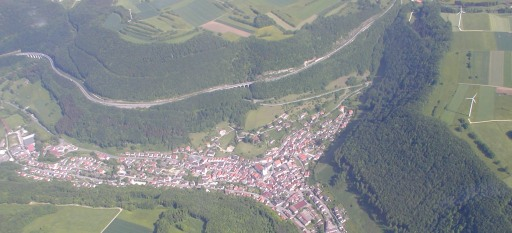
Aerial view of one half of the autobahn, above Wiesensteig

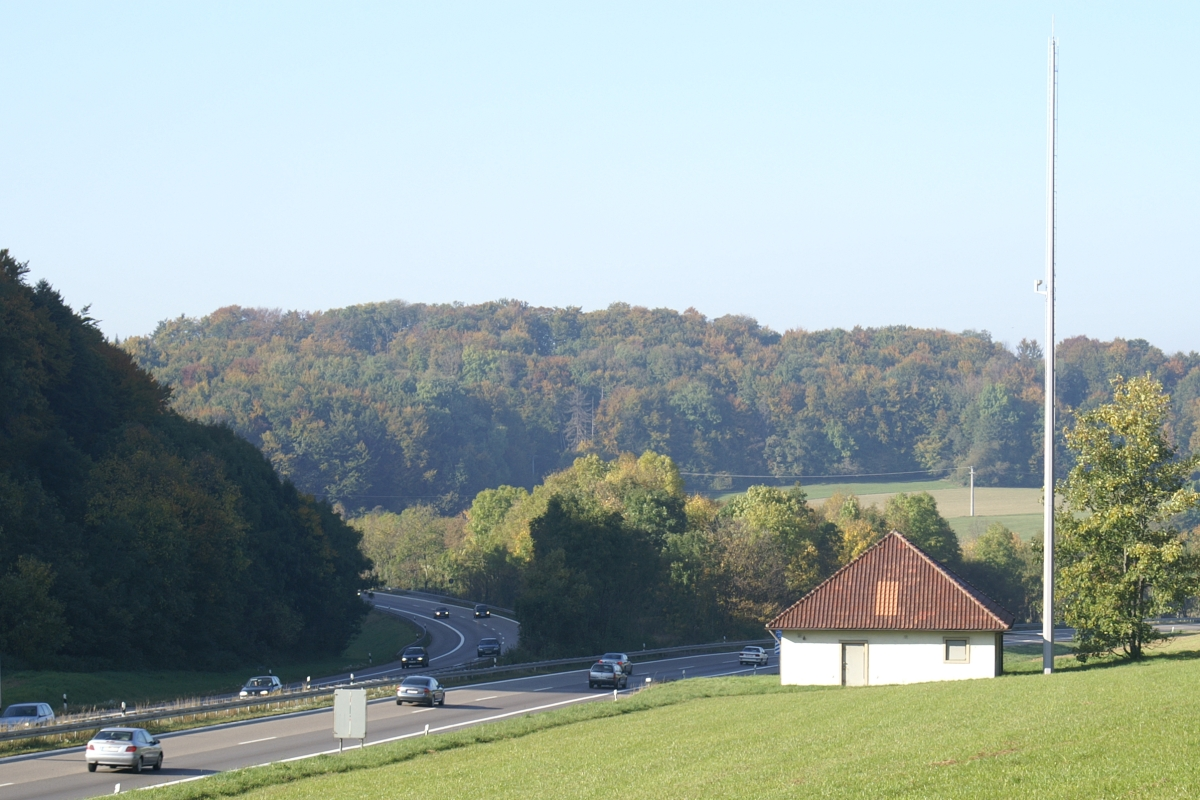
Divergence point at Hohenstadt: southbound carriageway on the left, northbound on the right

The Drackensteiner Hang is a mountainside in the Swabian Alps at Kirchheim unter Teck in Baden-Württemberg, Germany. Bundesautobahn 8 between Stuttgart and Ulm divides into separate northbound and southbound routes on either side of the peak. The two halves of the autobahn each traverse one tunnel and a series of two or three viaducts that were designed by Paul Bonatz and built for the Reichsautobahn; the bridges were all destroyed in World War II and had to be rebuilt, and the route in one direction was only completed in the 1950s. A project to reroute the autobahn with new tunnels and bridges has been postponed indefinitely.

== Route ==
The entire segment is 16 kilometres (9.9 mi) long. The separated sections, which are some 2 kilometres (1.2 mi) apart at the furthest and over which the autobahn rises or descends 230 metres (750 ft), lie between Mühlhausen im Täle and Hohenstadt, where there is an emergency access road. North of Mühlhausen, traffic southbound from Aichelberg, where the first viaduct is located, climbs 200 metres (660 ft) up the north-west-facing slope of the Swabian Alps, known as the Albtrauf, crosses the 500 metres (1,600 ft) long Mustobel Viaduct and travels a further 7 kilometres (4.3 mi) through a mountain valley and the valley of the Winkelbach to the upper reaches of the River Fils, descending approximately 50 metres (160 ft) near Gruibingen.

The southbound carriageway is 6.4 kilometres (4.0 mi) long, crossing the Fils northeast of Mühlhausen and then climbing to the 371 metres (1,217 ft) long Todsburg Bridge, which skirts the Steinbühl (797 metres (2,615 ft) above sea level) near the Todsburger Höhle cave. It then continues to climb, crossing the 150 metres (490 ft) long Malakoff Bridge and passing through the 625 metres (2,051 ft) long Lämmerbuckel Tunnel before rejoining the other carriageway at Hohenstadt.

The northbound carriageway, 5.7 kilometres (3.5 mi) long, passes through the 60 metres (200 ft) long Nasenfels Tunnel and skirts the Drackensteiner Hang proper on the 230 metres (750 ft) long Drachenloch Bridge (named for the 'dragon's cave', sealed off in the building of the motorway, the story of which is presumed to have given the name to the cliffside and the community of Drackenstein), the 100 metres (330 ft) long Himmelsleiter Bridge and the 250 metres (820 ft) long Fischerhäusle Bridge before crossing the Fils west of Gosbach.

== History ==
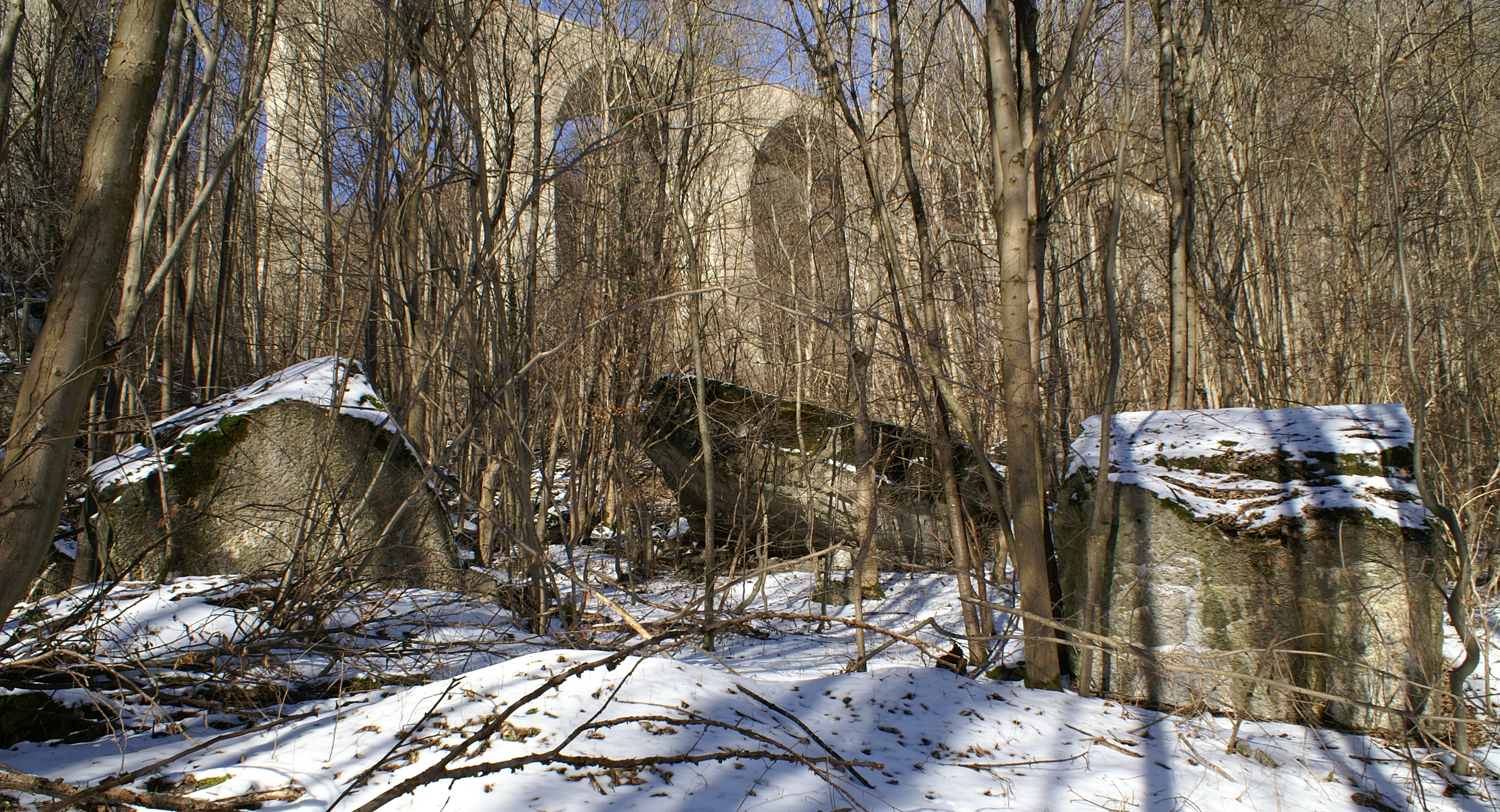
Debris from the original Drachenloch Bridge in the valley below, January 2009

The segment was built during the Third Reich as part of Reichsautobahn 26 between Munich and Stuttgart. Work began in 1936 and continued on the southbound section of divided carriageway until 1942, when it stopped because of World War II. The carriageways were divided because of the steepness of the mountainside: having the entire four lanes skirt the same side of the peak was not technically feasible, and stacking the carriageways one above the other would have been too expensive. The impact of large supports under a four-lane structure on the beauty of the landscape was also a consideration, as it had been in the Aichelberg section, which was built stacked to minimise this. There was a viaduct at the Aichelberg and another over the Franzosenschlucht, at Gruibingen. For the divided sections, Paul Bonatz was the primary bridge designer, in collaboration with Wilhelm Tiedje as engineer.

The northbound carriageway was completed in record time and opened on 30 October 1937 carrying traffic in a single lane in each direction. Small viewing points were provided on the valley side of the road, and the viaducts were used for advertising the beauty of the autobahns, and became well known. Except for the Lämmerbuckel Tunnel, begun in late autumn 1937, work on the southbound route began in 1938, and it was not complete when construction was halted in 1942. The almost finished Lämmerbuckel Tunnel was then closed at both ends with heavy gates and used for production of aircraft engines and other armaments by Heller and Daimler-Benz; heating, lighting and living quarters were provided inside. The land above the tunnel is still owned by Daimler, who have a training centre there.

On 20 April 1945, the retreating Wehrmacht blew up the Franzosenschlucht Viaduct and the Aichelberg Viaduct on the segment of motorway north of the division of routes. Temporary wooden bridges replaced them until 1951. The Drachenloch Bridge had already been blown up on 19 March; the debris remains in the valley and this area and the land around the other two viaducts on the northbound section, the Himmelsleiter Bridge and Fischerhäusle Bridge, are a protected historic landmark. The unfinished central section of the Lämmerbuckel Tunnel was also collapsed with explosives.

The southbound carriageway was finally completed in 1955–1957, with work including completion of both viaducts, creation of the road bed and retaining walls (using concrete, rather than the paving stones and masonry that had been used for the northbound section), and installation of bomb shelters in the Lämmerbuckel Tunnel, which when the segment finally opened on 25 May 1957, was the longest motorway tunnel in Europe. To enable repairs to be made to the northbound carriageway, traffic in both directions then used the southbound route until May–June 1960.

Traffic on the Aichelberg segment increased hugely, from a daily average of 31,500 in 1974 to almost 50,000 in 1989, with peak loads of 75,000 a day, and both traffic jams and accidents were common. Lorries, in particular, found the gradient of almost 7% difficult to negotiate. The aging Franzosenschlucht Viaduct was supported with props in places. Between 1985 and 1990, the Aichelberg segment was extensively rebuilt, widened to the now normal three lanes in each direction, and straightened. Two new bridges were built—the Maustobel Bridge replaces a tight 'forest curve', and both the Aichelberg and Franzosenschlucht Viaducts were replaced on different sites—a wildlife crossing was constructed, and a stream was diverted.

In 2005, plans were completed to similarly replace the divided routes around the mountain at the Drackensteiner Hang with a single more direct three-lane route between Mühlhausen and a new Hohenstadt intersection at Widderstall. The route is to include two new tunnels (Himmelsschleife, 1,200 metres (3,900 ft) long and Drackenstein, 1,700 metres (5,600 ft) long) and two new bridges over the Fils and Gosbach valleys (800 metres (2,600 ft) and 460 metres (1,510 ft) long). The plan foresees retention of the southbound route as a rural road, with most of the northbound route being returned to a natural state, as was done after the rerouting of the Aichelberg section. The work, estimated to take five years, was to have been funded by a private investor who would then operate the segment as a toll road, the first in the German autobahn system to be funded and operated privately. However, an economic feasibility study showed this to be impractical. The plan is now indefinitely postponed, although it was listed as a priority for use of construction funds in the 2011–15 period by the German Minister of Transport, Peter Ramsauer.

In 2011, the Lämmerbuckel Tunnel was completely renovated, including replacement of the wall tiles installed in the 1950s by moisture-resistant concrete and improvement of emergency facilities.

== Aesthetics ==
Paul Bonatz's viaducts at the Drackensteiner Hang have been praised as an example of "monumentality and daring in harmonious balance".

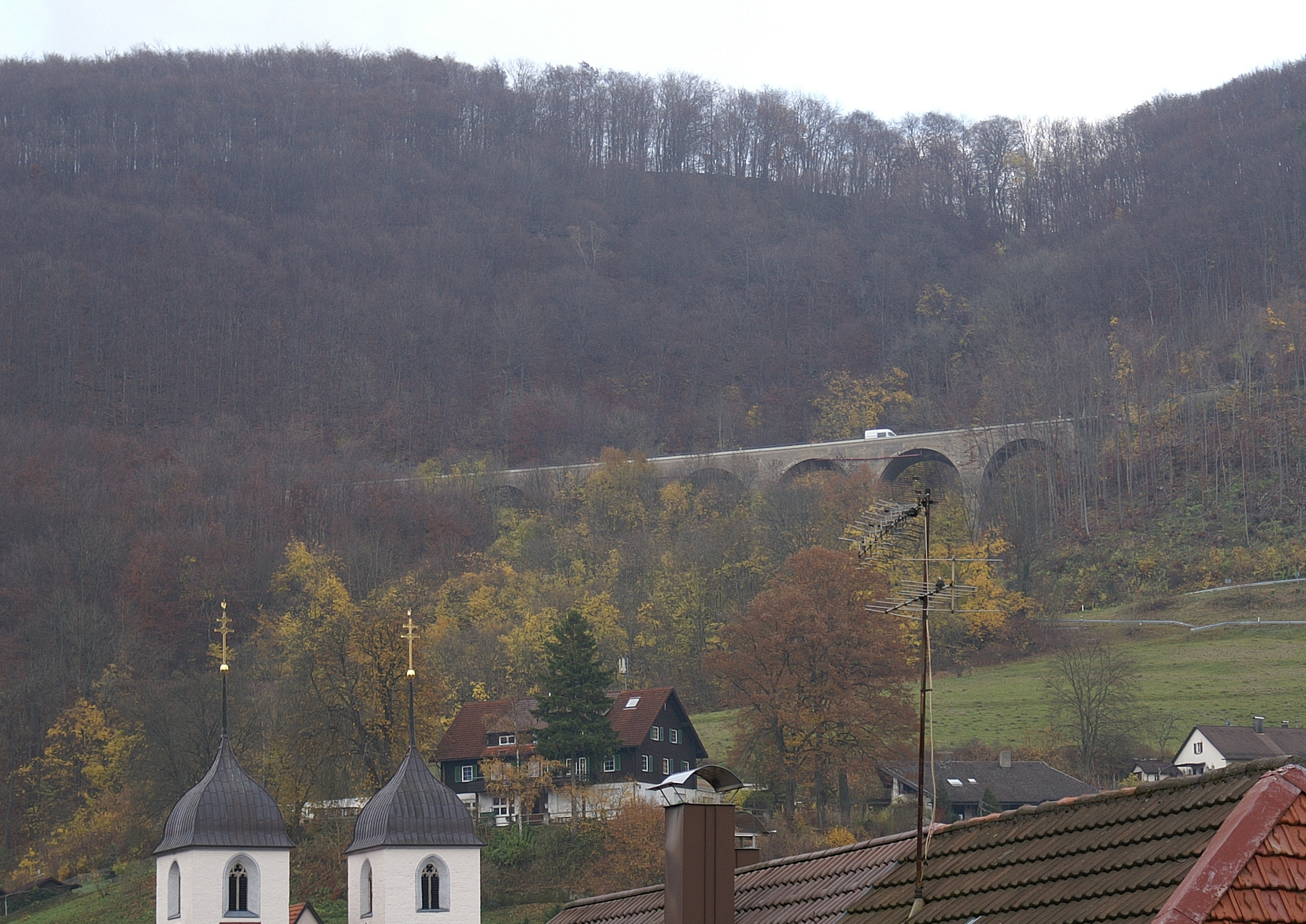
Malakoff Bridge; in the foreground, Wiesensteig

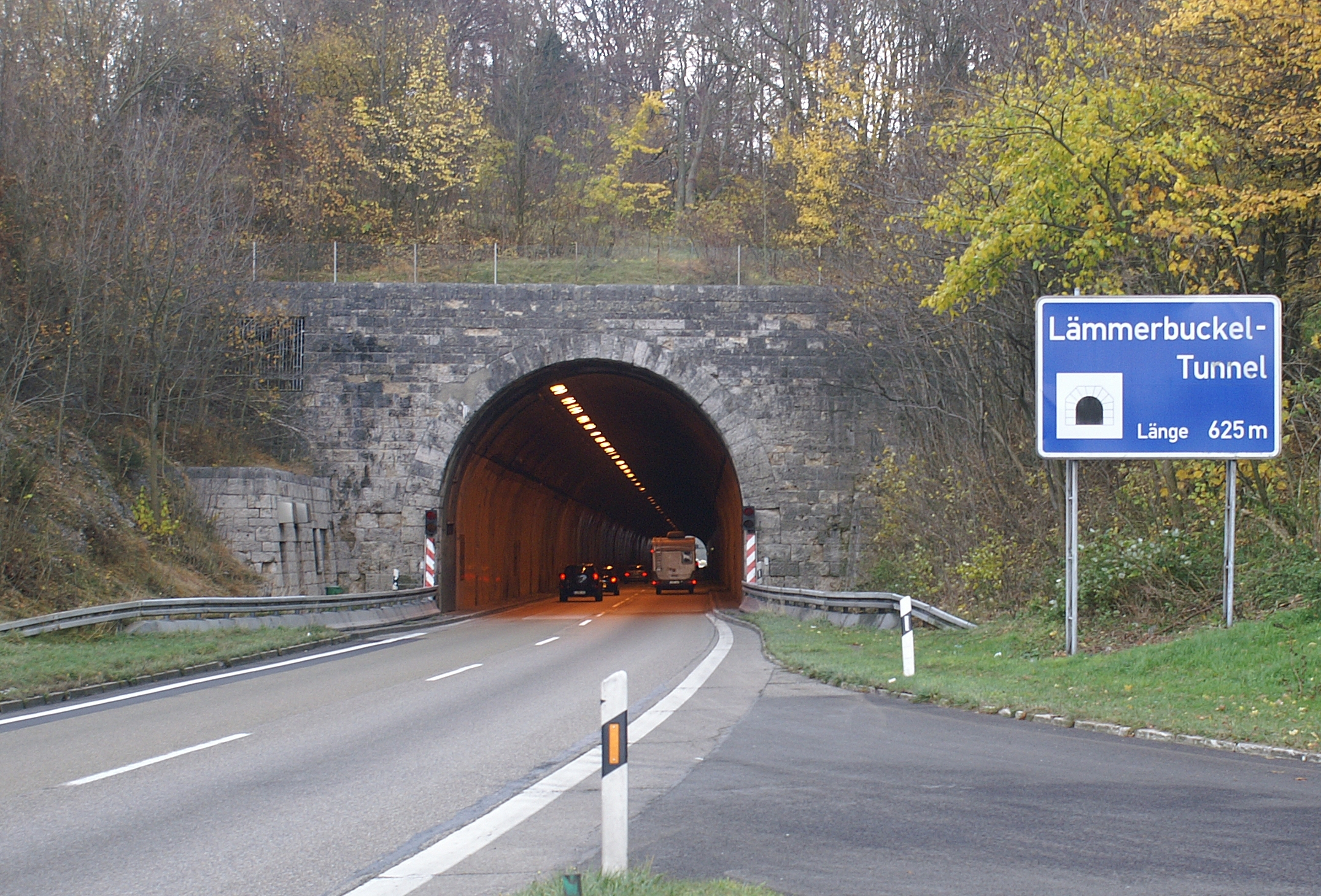
entrance to Lämmerbuckel Tunnel

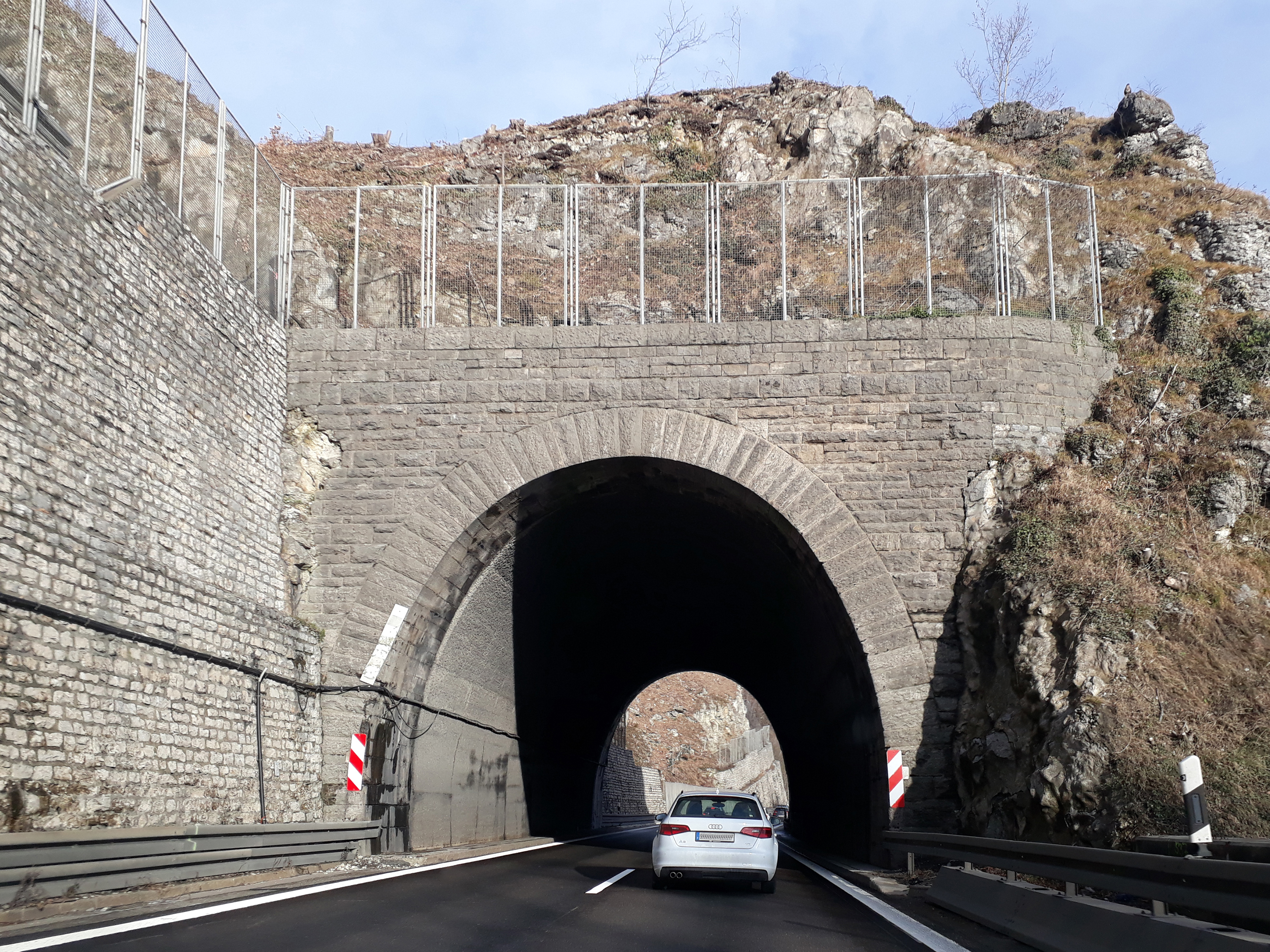
Nasenfels Tunnel

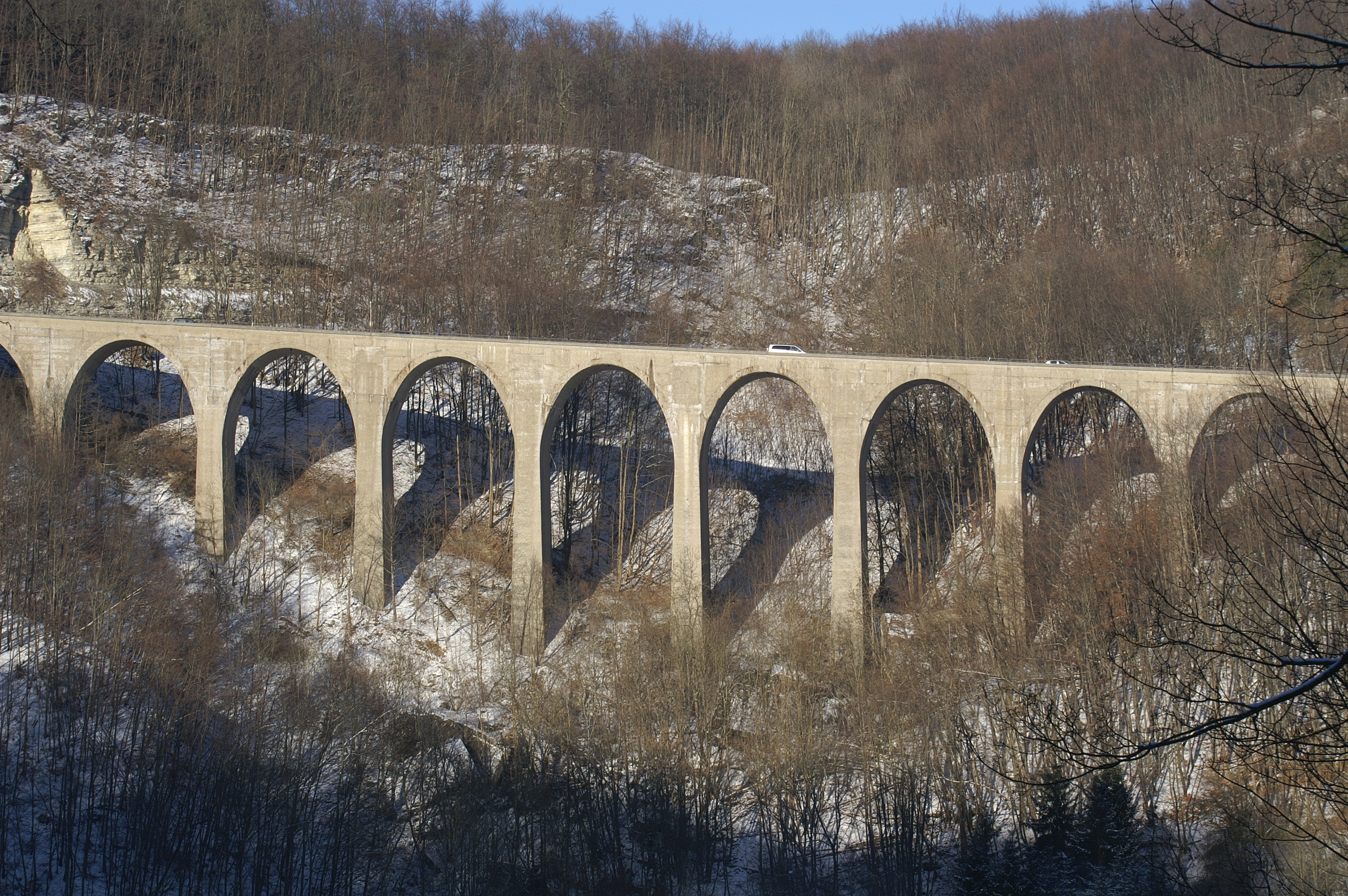
Drachenloch Bridge
