= Hohenstadt Transmission Tower =

- Sendeturm Hohenstadt
- Location within Germany

General information
- Type: Lattice transmission tower
- Location: Hohenstadt, Göppingen, Baden-Württemberg, Germany, Germany, Germany
- Coordinates: 48.5497°N 9.6708°E

Height
- Height: 137 m (449 ft)

Hohenstadt Transmission Tower (German: Sendeturm Hohenstadt) is a steel German truss transmission tower in the municipality of Hohenstadt, formerly used by the military as a directional radio tower. Surrounded by abandoned military facilities and farm fields, the Hohenstadt Transmission Tower can be accessed through a dirt road that connects the surrounding area to several neighborhoods throughout the municipality. The transmission tower has a height of 137 m (449 ft), tall enough to have a good glimpse of the surrounding areas.

== History ==
Although the exact date of its construction is still unknown, the Hohenstadt Transmission Tower stands on a land that has undergone several notable events in the history of the municipality. The land, about 2 to 3 acres, was originally leased by the U.S. Government in 1950. Abandoned former military facilities surrounding the tower were first utilized by the USAF (United States Air Force) mobile relay equipment units as trucks and vehicle shelters in 1951. In 1954, the 315th Signal Bn (later the 102nd Signal Bn) established a VHF relay on the site and built permanent housing for 6 staff members, including a security fence. Additionally, a diesel generator in a small shed was erected. The relay was part of the USAREUR Multi-channel Radio Telephone Network which provided Class A telephones and teletype services throughout Europe. Two towers, that were 30.48 m (100 ft) in height, were utilized by the military, facing southeast toward Hohenpeißenberg and northwest toward Stuttgart. Additionally, a 53.34-metre-tall antenna tower was erected at that point by the USAF. By 1967, the Army system became obsolete and was thus, replaced by a Tropospheric scatter microwave equipment which was part of the Digital European Backbone system (DEB). Afterwards in the same year, the 102nd Signal Bn abandoned the site and dismantled the two towers, although the DEB and the third antenna tower were maintained by the 69th Signal Bn and utilized a new and more innovative 60.96-metre-tall tower that possesses multiple parabolic reflector antennas. From 1967 up until the present time, numerous military systems and units utilized the location since it was a valuable high-ground location for communication relays. This necessitated three new buildings on the site.

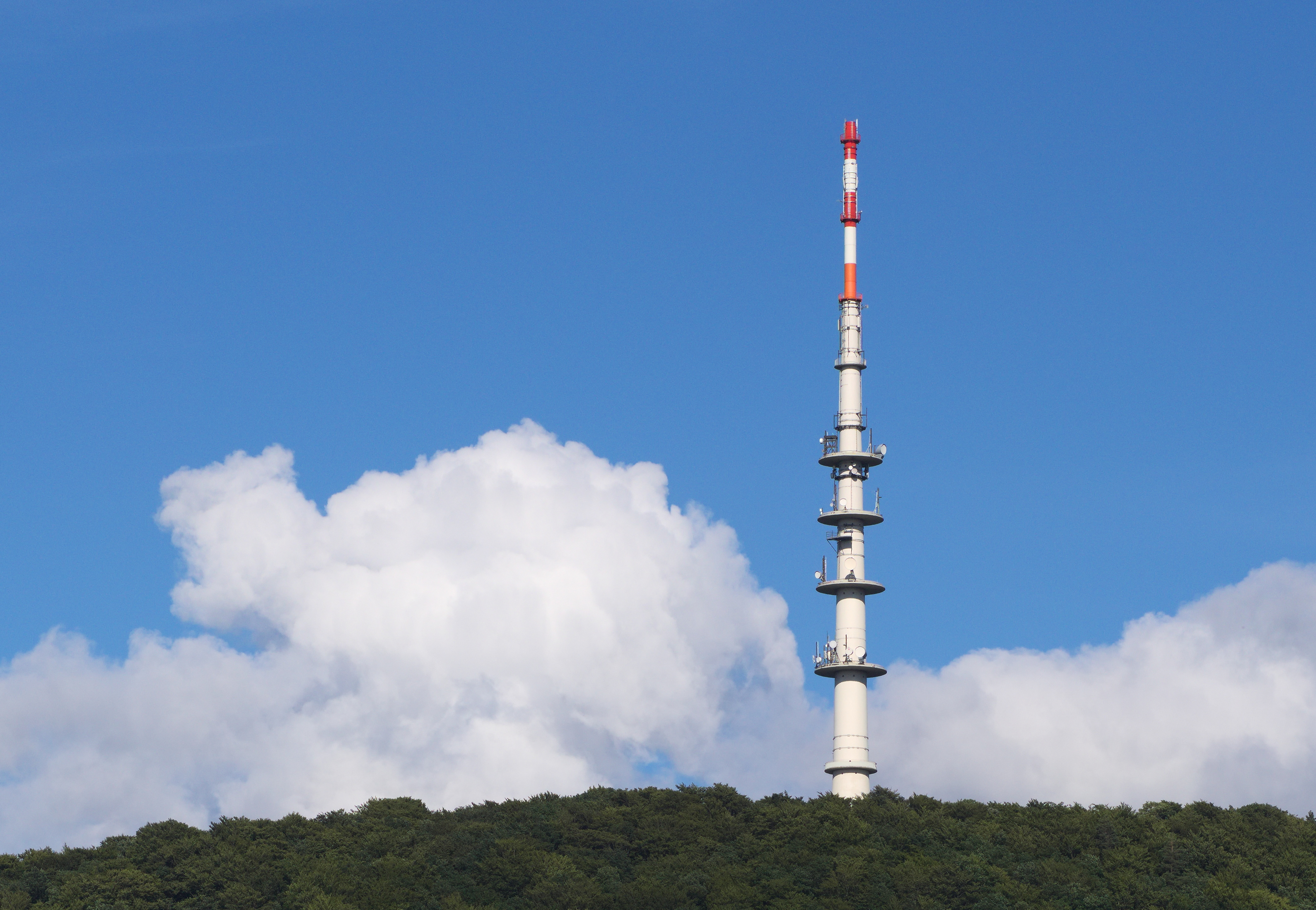
Heubach telecommunication tower

By the early 1990s, the site was automated with no technical personnel present. The U.S. Army announced that the DEB would be decommissioned by 2006, being replaced by a fiber optic cable and all DEB assets would be removed from Hohenstadt. Afterwards, a 137-meter-tall transmission tower, that is the Hohenstadt Transmission Tower, was constructed.

== Geography ==
The Hohenstadt Transmission Tower lies in farm fields in Hohenstadt, approximately halfway between the municipality and Drackenstein. Surrounding abandoned military facilities are still present in the site. The site is situated in the municipality, often called township, of Hohenstadt, which in turn, lies in the kreis (district) of Göppingen, in the state of Baden-Württemberg, Germany.
