= Merklingen =

- Municipality
- Coat of arms

- Location of Merklingen within Alb-Donau-Kreis district
- Interactive map of Merklingen
- Location within Germany Location within Baden-Württemberg
- Coordinates: 48°30′31″N 9°45′15″E
- Country: Germany
- State: Baden-Württemberg
- Admin. region: Tübingen
- District: Alb-Donau-Kreis

Government
  - Mayor (2017–25): Sven Kneipp (Ind.)

Area
  - Total: 21.31 km^{2} (8.23 sq mi)
- Elevation: 699 m (2,293 ft)

Population (2025-12-31)
  - Total: 2,153
  - Density: 101.0/km^{2} (261.7/sq mi)
- Time zone: UTC+01:00 (CET)
  - Summer (DST): UTC+02:00 (CEST)
- Postal codes: 89188
- Dialling codes: 07337
- Vehicle registration: UL
- Website: www.merklingen.de

Merklingen is a municipality in the district of Alb-Donau in Baden-Württemberg in Germany.

== Geographical location ==
Merklingen is located on the plateau of the Swabian Jura, about 20 kilometers northwest of Ulm, between Geislingen and Blaubeuren.

== Expansion of the municipality ==
The district is approximately 21.31 square kilometers.

== Neighboring communities ==
The neighboring communities of Merklingen are (clockwise from north): Nellingen, Dornstadt, Laichingen (all Alb-Donau-Kreis), Hohenstadt, Drackenstein, Bad Ditzenbach (all Göppingen district).

== Municipality arrangement ==
Merklingen, consisting of the main town and the hamlet Widderstall, remained an independent municipality with its own administration.

== Air ==
The climate is: dry summers, fog in autumn, cold winters.

== History ==
In 861, we find the first mention of Merklingen as Marchelingen in a document of the monastery of Wiesensteig. Since 1482 the place belonged to the territory of the Free imperial city of Ulm. Merklingen came in 1810 to the Kingdom of Württemberg and was allocated to Oberamt Blaubeuren, which became in 1938 the district of Ulm.

== Demographics ==
Population development:

Year	Inhabitants
1990	1,575
2001	1,852
2011	1,883
2021	2,098

== Politics ==
=== Mayor ===
- •1945-1977 John Lohrmann
- •1977-1986 Peter Seyfried
- •1986-2009 Günter Stolz
- •On 27 September 2009 Sven Kneipp was elected as the new mayor.

=== Council ===
The council of Merklingen has 10 members. The council consists of the elected honorary councilors and the mayor as chairman. The mayor is entitled to vote in the municipal council.

== Economy and Infrastructure ==
Merklingen has a commercial infrastructure with numerous medium-sized companies as well as local retailers.

=== Transportation ===
Until 1985 Merklingen was connected with the narrow gauge railway Amstetten- Laichingen to the Fils Valley Railway from Stuttgart to Ulm. At the national road network Merklingen is connected with the Bundesautobahn 8.

== Educational institutions ==
In Merklingen itself is a primary school. In the neighboring village of Nellingen a high school is established, Realschule and Gymnasium can be visited in Laichingen.

== Buildings ==
- Solar Test Widderstall (Centre for Solar Energy and Hydrogen Research Baden-Württemberg)
- Renovated community hall with cultural and community facilities
- New sports and multipurpose hall
- New riding hall of the Riding and Driving Association Merklingen (2005).

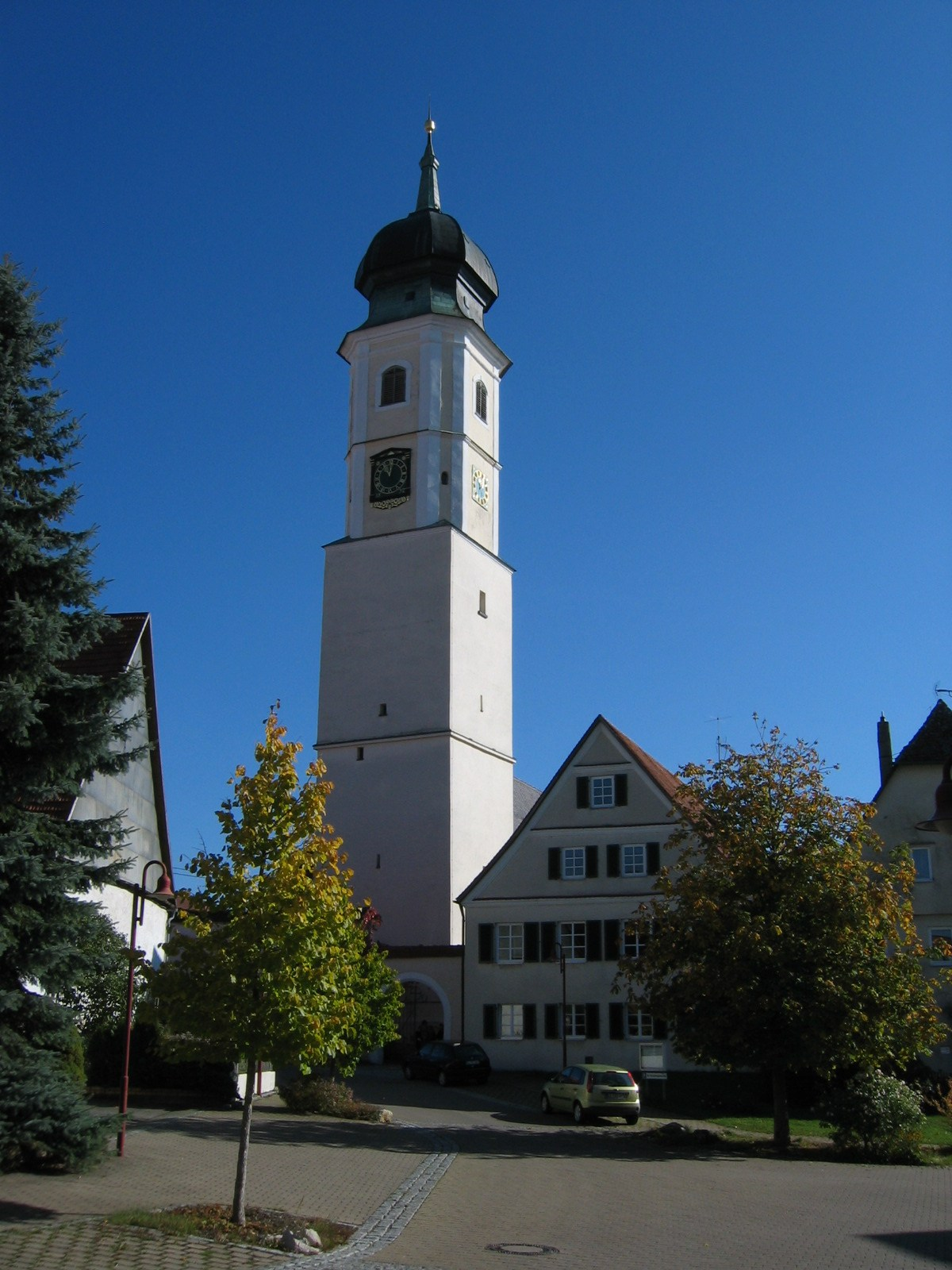
Merklingen church

== Teams ==
In addition to the biggest club in Merklingen, the Arbeiter-Samariter-Bund, still exist other clubs. The Turnverein 1862 Merklingen has a considerable number of members. Other clubs are, for example, the Musikverein Merklingen, the Riding and Driving Club, the church music, the horticultural association and the glee club.
