= Mühlhausen im Täle =

German municipality

- Municipality
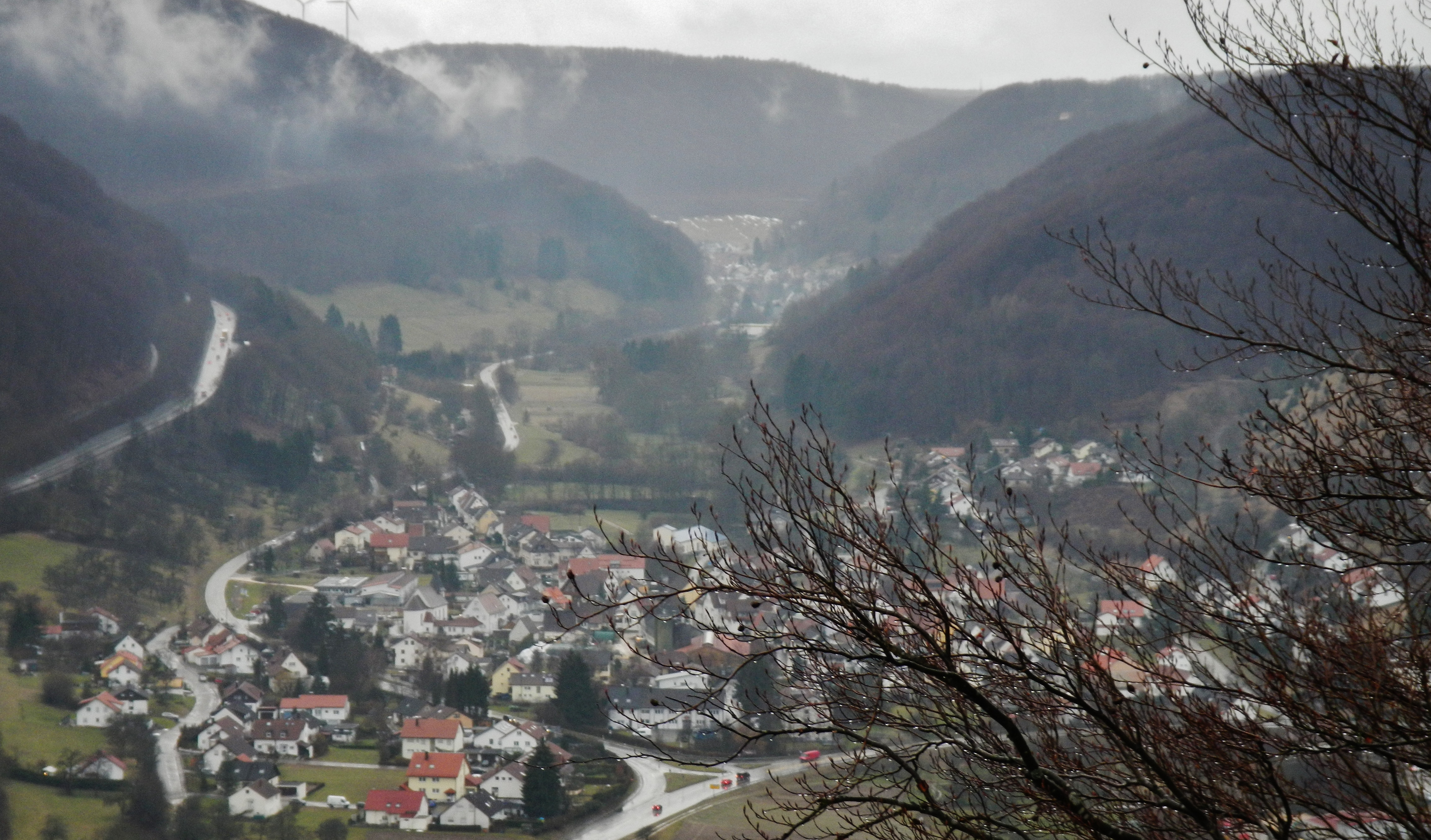
- View of Mühlhausen from the A8

- Coat of arms

- Location of Mühlhausen im Täle within Göppingen district
- Interactive map of Mühlhausen im Täle
- Location within Germany Location within Baden-Württemberg
- Coordinates: 48°34′44″N 9°39′30″E
- Country: Germany
- State: Baden-Württemberg
- Admin. region: Stuttgart
- District: Göppingen

Area
  - Total: 6.33 km^{2} (2.44 sq mi)
- Elevation: 545 m (1,788 ft)

Population (2025-12-31)
  - Total: 1,111
  - Density: 176/km^{2} (455/sq mi)
- Time zone: UTC+01:00 (CET)
  - Summer (DST): UTC+02:00 (CEST)
- Postal codes: 73347
- Dialling codes: 07335
- Vehicle registration: GP
- Website: www.muehlhausen-taele.de

Mühlhausen im Täle (German pronunciation: [myːlˈhaʊzn̩ ʔɪm ˈtɛːlə], lit. 'Mühlhausen in the Valley') is a municipality of the district of Göppingen in Baden-Württemberg, Germany.

== History ==
Mühlhausen im Täle was first mentioned in 812. In the 12th century, it became a possession of the County of Helfenstein, who ruled the area until it was mediatized to the Kingdom of Württemberg in 1806. Mühlhausen was first placed under the jurisdiction of Wiesensteig but in 1809 was assigned to Oberamt Geislingen. In 1938, the town was assigned to the district of Göppingen. Mühlhausen grew extensively after World War II. Its municipal name was changed from Mühlhausen to Mühlhausen im Täle in 1959.

== Geography ==
The municipality (Gemeinde) of Mühlhausen im Täle is found in the south of the district of Göppingen, in the German state of Baden-Württemberg. Mühlhausen is physically located in the upper valley of the Fils, in the Middle Kuppenalb. Elevation above sea level in the municipal area ranges from a high of 820 meters (2,690 ft) Normalnull (NN) to a low of 531 meters (1,742 ft) NN.

Portions of the Federally-protected Rufsteinhänge und Umgebung and Sterneck nature reserves are located in Mühlhausen's municipal area.

== Demographics ==
Population development:

Year	Inhabitants
1990	1,028
2001	1,019
2011	980
2021	1,095

== Politics ==
The municipality of Mühlhausen im Täle includes the villages of Eselhöfe, Exenmühle, and Todsburg. Along with the municipalities of Wiesensteig, Drackenstein, Gruibingen, and Hohenstadt, Mühlhausen has since 1972 been a member of the Upper Fils Valley governmental association. Mühlhausen is also a member of the local school association and sewage association.

=== Coat of arms ===
Mühlhausen's coat of arms displays a cuckoo bird in white upon a field of red. The cuckoo bird is a reference to a local nickname for Mühlhausen's inhabitants and the tincture is taken from the arms of the House of Rechberg. This pattern was first adopted by the municipal council in 1930 and was approved for official use and a corresponding municipal flag issued by the Federal Ministry of the Interior on 19 February 1959.

== Transportation ==
Mühlhausen is connected to Germany's network of roadways by Bundesautobahn 8 and Bundesstraße 466. From 1903 to 1968, it was connected to Germany's railway system by the Tälesbahn railroad. Local public transportation is provided by the Filsland Mobilitätsverbund.
