= Bad Überkingen =

German municipality

- Municipality
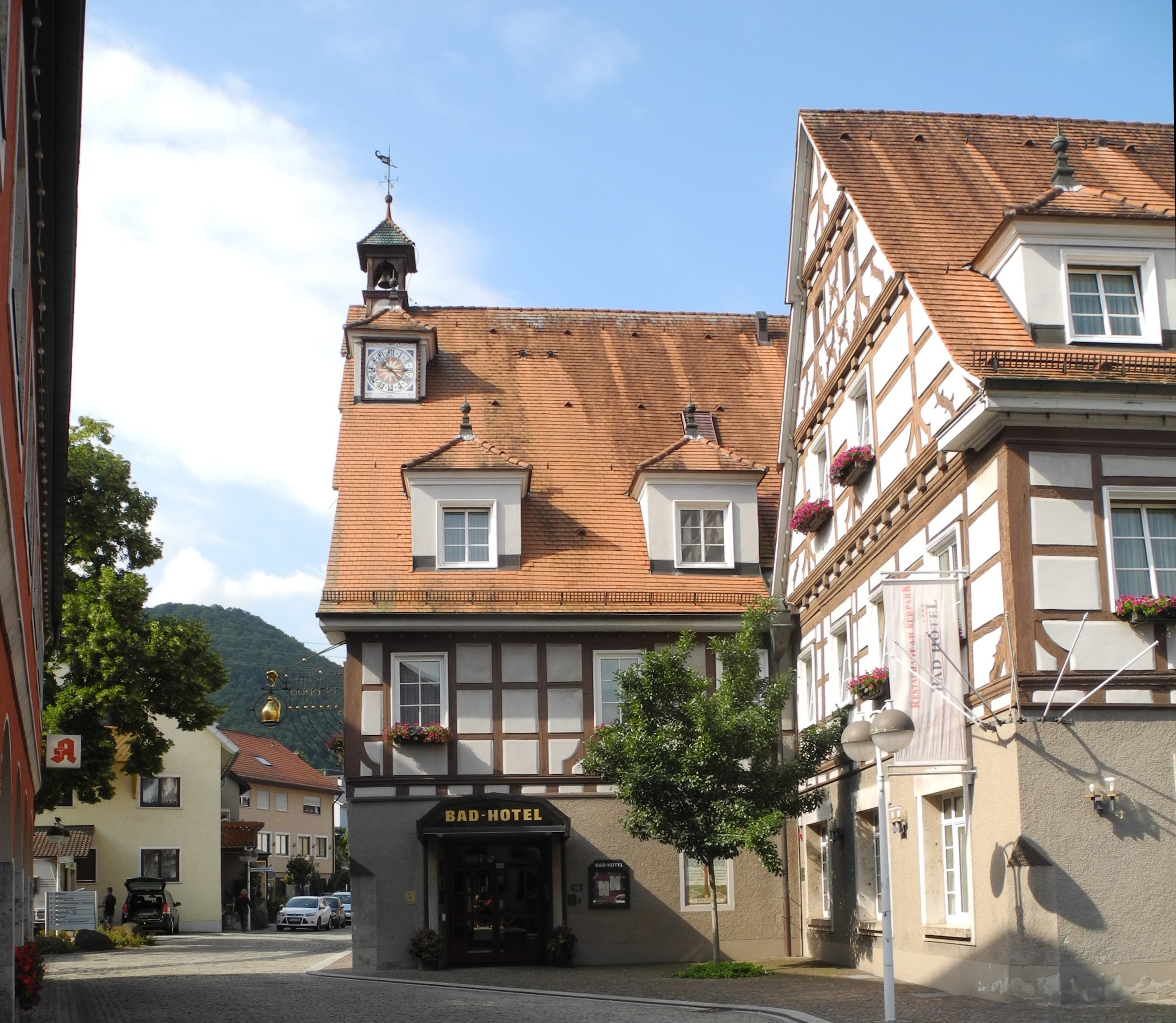
- Town center with the old town hall

- Coat of arms

- Location of Bad Überkingen within Göppingen district
- Interactive map of Bad Überkingen
- Location within Germany Location within Baden-Württemberg
- Coordinates: 48°36′1″N 9°47′56″E
- Country: Germany
- State: Baden-Württemberg
- Admin. region: Stuttgart
- District: Göppingen

Area
  - Total: 24.02 km^{2} (9.27 sq mi)
- Elevation: 455 m (1,493 ft)

Population (2025-12-31)
  - Total: 3,783
  - Density: 157.5/km^{2} (407.9/sq mi)
- Time zone: UTC+01:00 (CET)
  - Summer (DST): UTC+02:00 (CEST)
- Postal codes: 73334–73337
- Dialling codes: 07331
- Vehicle registration: GP
- Website: www.bad-ueberkingen.de

Bad Überkingen is a municipality in the district of Göppingen in Baden-Württemberg, Germany.

== History ==
The three towns of Bad Überkingen, Hausen an der Fils, and Unterböhringen were ceded by the Free Imperial City of Ulm to the Electorate of Bavaria in 1802. In 1810, Bavaria ceded the three towns to the Kingdom of Württemberg, whose government assigned them to Oberamt Göppingen. Bad Überkingen was allowed to append the prefix "Bad" to its name in 1927. The district of Göppingen was reorganized in 1938 as Landkreis Göppingen, its current and contemporary form.

Hausen an der Fils and Unterböhringen were incorporated into Bad Überkingen in 1973.

== Geography ==
The municipality (Gemeinde) of Bad Überkingen is situated in the district of Göppingen, in Baden-Württemberg, one of the 16 States of the Federal Republic of Germany. Bad Überkingen is physically located in the central foothills of the Swabian Jura, in the upper Fils river valley as far as the Filsalb. Elevation above sea level in the municipal area ranges from a high of 751 meters (2,464 ft) Normalnull (NN) on the Michelsberg to a low of 400 meters (1,300 ft) NN on the Fils.

Portions of the Federally-protected Autal, Dalisberg, and Hausener Wand (protected landscape) nature reserves are located in Bad Überkingen's municipal area.

== Politics ==
Bad Überkingen has three boroughs (Ortsteile) – Bad Überkingen, Hausen an der Fils, Unterböhringen – and three villages: Michelsberg, Oberböhringen, and Wasserberghaus. The abandoned village of Winegundenwilare is located in the municipal area. Bad Überkingen is in an mutually-beneficial municipal association with the municipalities of Geislingen an der Steige and Kuchen.

=== Coat of arms ===
The coat of arms for Bad Überkingen displays a red fountain with blue waters above a wavy blue surface upon a field of white. This coat of arms was awarded to the municipality with a corresponding municipal flag by the Federal Ministry of the Interior on 18 August 1959.

== Transportation ==
Bad Überkingen is connected to Germany's network of roadways by Bundesstraße 466. From 1903 to 1983, Bad Überkingen and Hausen an der Fils were served by Tälesbahn railroad. Local public transportation is provided by the Filsland Mobilitätsverbundes.
