= Tälesbahn =

The Tälesbahn may refer to one of two railway lines in Baden-Württemberg:

- Tälesbahn (Nürtingen–Neuffen)
- Tälesbahn (Geislingen–Wiesensteig)
