= Salach =

German municipality

- Municipality
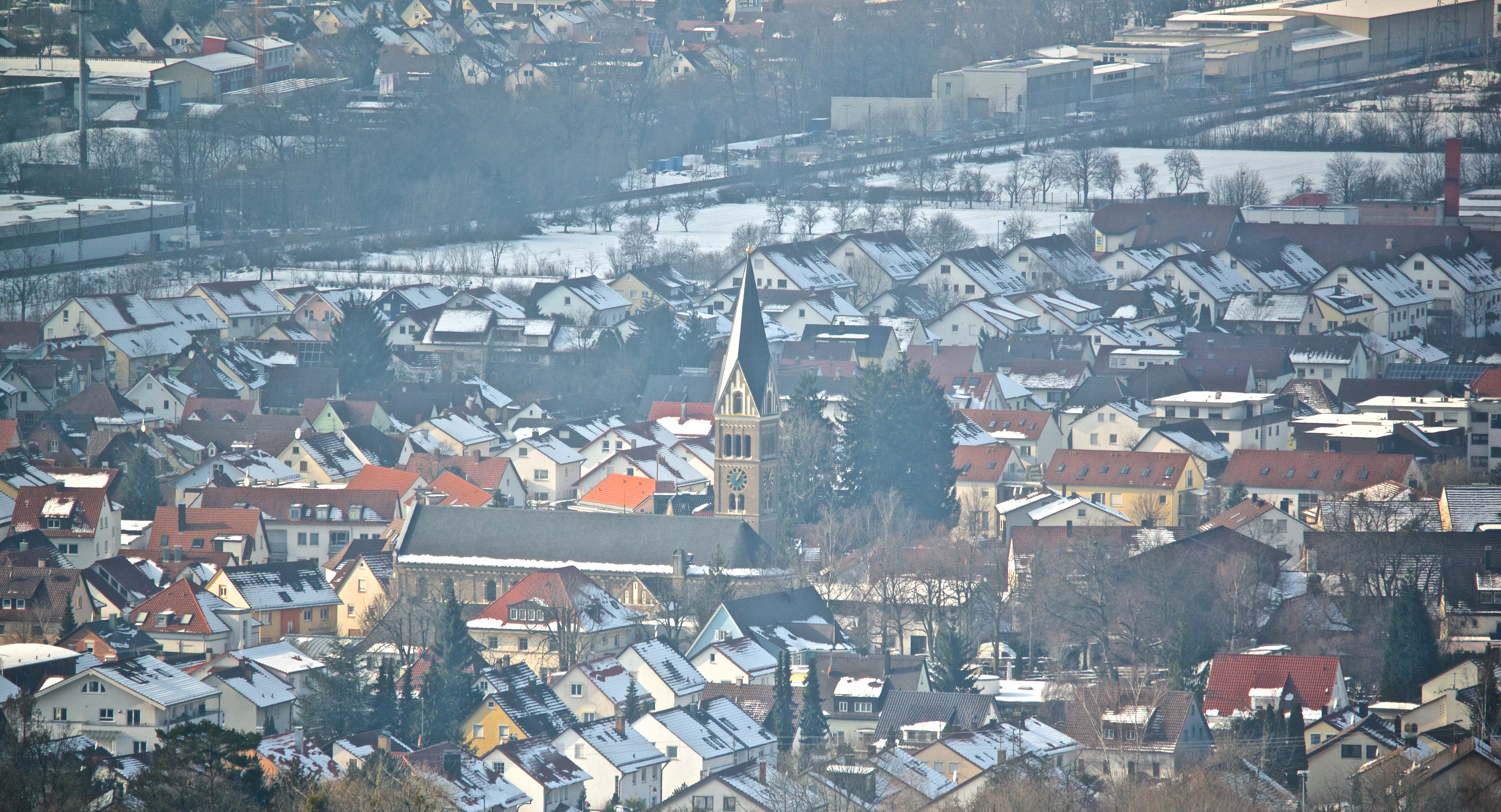
- Aerial view of Salach

- Coat of arms

- Location of Salach within Göppingen district
- Interactive map of Salach
- Location within Germany Location within Baden-Württemberg
- Coordinates: 48°41′20″N 9°44′09″E
- Country: Germany
- State: Baden-Württemberg
- Admin. region: Stuttgart
- District: Göppingen

Government
  - Mayor (2022–30): Dennis Eberle (CDU)

Area
  - Total: 8.31 km^{2} (3.21 sq mi)
- Elevation: 362 m (1,188 ft)

Population (2025-12-31)
  - Total: 8,071
  - Density: 971/km^{2} (2,520/sq mi)
- Time zone: UTC+01:00 (CET)
  - Summer (DST): UTC+02:00 (CEST)
- Postal codes: 73084
- Dialling codes: 07162
- Vehicle registration: GP
- Website: www.salach.de

Salach (German pronunciation: [ˈzaːlax]) is a municipality in the district of Göppingen in Baden-Württemberg in southern Germany.

== History ==
In 1806, Salach, previously a possession of the Lordship of Staufeneck, was mediatized to the Kingdom of Württemberg. The town was assigned to Oberamt Göppingen, then connected to the growing system of railways in Europe in 1847 by the Fils Valley Railway. Oberamt Göppingen was reorganized in 1938 as Landkreis Göppingen, under whose jurisdiction Salach remained. The town began a period of urban growth after World War II, adding new areas to its northern and southern extremities.

== Geography ==
The municipality (Gemeinde) of Salach is found in the district of Göppingen, in Baden-Württemberg, one of the 16 States of the Federal Republic of Germany. Salach is physically located in the Fils river valley, in the central and eastern foothills of the Swabian Jura. Elevation above sea level in the municipal area ranges from a high of 551 meters (1,808 ft) Normalnull (NN) to a low of 346 meters (1,135 ft) NN.

== Politics ==
Salach has one borough (Ortsteil), Salach, and seven villages: Baierhof, Bärenbachhof, Bärenbach, Bärenhöfle, Kapfhöfe, Schafhof, and Staufeneck. The municipality of Salach is in a municipal association with the city of Eislingen and the municipality of Ottenbach.

=== Coat of arms ===
The municipal coat of arms for Salach displays a lion, in blue and facing to the left, upon a field of yellow. This is the coat of arms of the Lords of Staufeneck and it was adopted by the municipal council on the suggestion of the Central State Archive Stuttgart in 1912. It was approved for official use, and a corresponding flag issued to the municipality, by the Federal Ministry of the Interior on 7 March 1960.

== Transportation ==
Salach is connected to Germany's network of roadways by Bundesstraße 10 and to its railways by the Fils Valley Railway. Local public transportation is provided by the Filsland Mobilitätsverbundes.
