= Deggingen =

German municipality

- Municipality
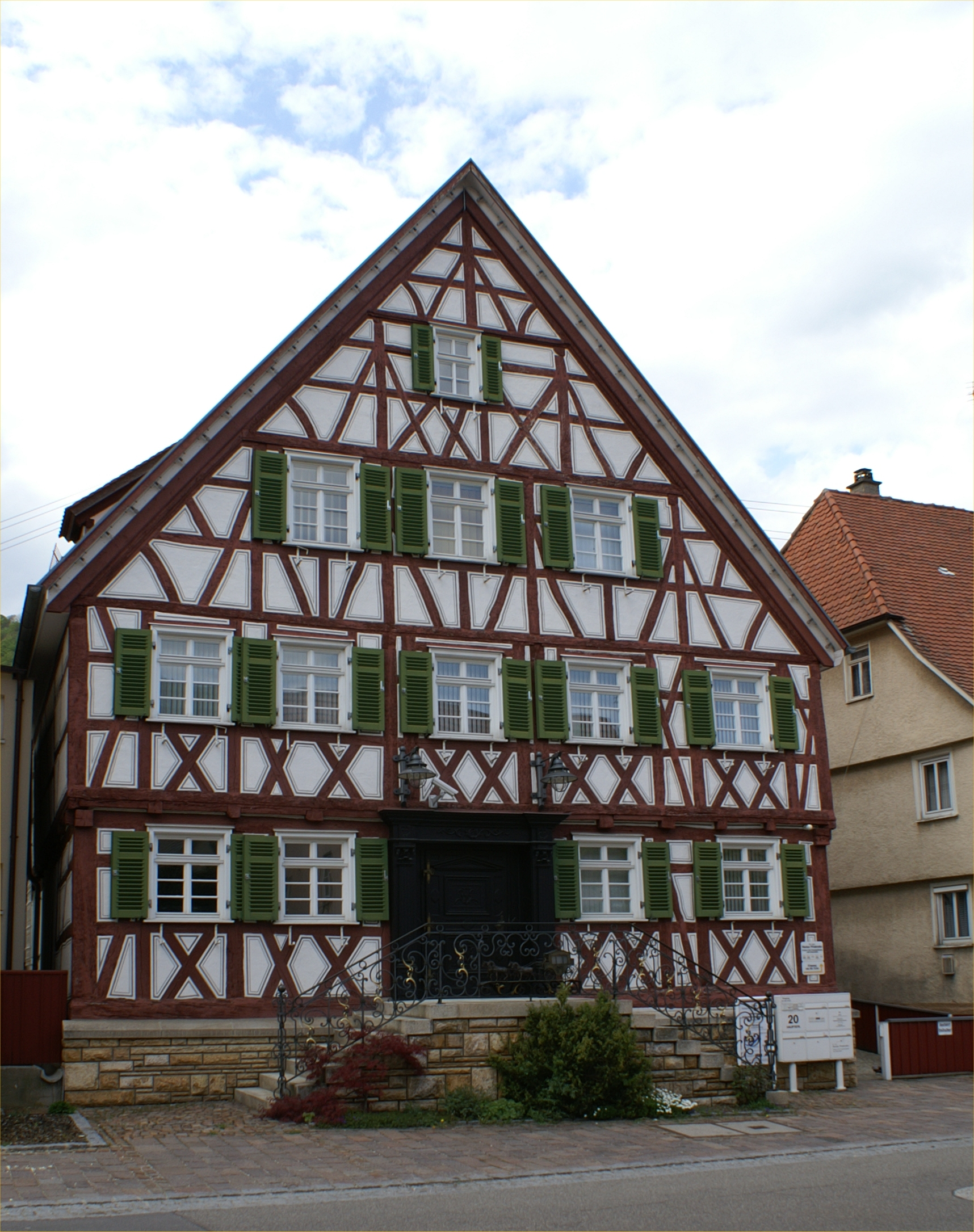
- The Gasthaus Post, Deggingen

- Coat of arms

- Location of Deggingen within Göppingen district
- Interactive map of Deggingen
- Location within Germany Location within Baden-Württemberg
- Coordinates: 48°35′47″N 9°43′9″E
- Country: Germany
- State: Baden-Württemberg
- Admin. region: Stuttgart
- District: Göppingen

Government
  - Mayor (2023–31): Markus Josef Schweizer (CDU)

Area
  - Total: 22.70 km^{2} (8.76 sq mi)
- Elevation: 492 m (1,614 ft)

Population (2025-12-31)
  - Total: 5,061
  - Density: 223.0/km^{2} (577.4/sq mi)
- Time zone: UTC+01:00 (CET)
  - Summer (DST): UTC+02:00 (CEST)
- Postal codes: 73326
- Dialling codes: 07334
- Vehicle registration: GP
- Website: www.deggingen.de

Deggingen is a municipality in the district of Göppingen in Baden-Württemberg, Germany.

== History ==
The House of Helfenstein ruled Deggingen until it went extinct in 1627. Deggingen and the town of Reichenbach im Täle were annexed by the Kingdom of Württemberg when, in 1806, the Lordship of Wiesensteig was mediatized to them. The two towns were assigned to Oberamt Wiesensteig until 1810, when they were reassigned to Oberamt Göppingen. That district was reorganized as Landkreis Göppingen, which retained Deggingen and Reichenbach im Täle. The two towns expanded dramatically after World War II, though Reichenbach im Täle's growth tapered off by the end of the 1960s. Reichenbach im Täle was incorporated into Denningen in 1975.

== Geography ==
The municipality (Gemeinde) of Deggingen is located in the district of Göppingen, in Baden-Württemberg, one of the 16 States of the Federal Republic of Germany. Deggingen is physically located in the upper Fils river valley, in the Filsalb region of the Middle Kuppenalb. Elevation above sea level in the municipal area ranges from a high of 777 meters (2,549 ft) Normalnull (NN) to a low of 465 meters (1,526 ft) NN.

Portions of the Federally protected Galgenberg, Haarberg-Wasserberg, Northern slopes of the Swabian Jura, nature reserves are located in Deggingen's municipal area.

== Politics ==
Deggingen has two boroughs (Ortsteile), Deggingen and Reichenbach im Täle, and five villages: Ave Maria, Berneck, Bierkeller, Gairen, and Nordalb. In the municipal area are two abandoned villages: Bogenweiler and Gerenberg. Deggingen is in a mutually-beneficial municipal association with the municipality of Bad Ditzenbach.

=== Coat of arms ===
The municipal coat of arms of Deggingen displays the head of an elephant, in white, above a yellow, six-pointed star, upon a field of red. The elephant is taken from the coat of arms of the County of Helfenstein, as was the red-yellow tincture, while the six-pointed star has been a symbol of Deggingen since 1551. This coat of arms was approved and a municipal flag issued by the Federal Ministry of the Interior on 30 June 1959.

== Transportation ==
Deggingen lies on the historically important Swabian Jura road. The municipality is connected to Germany's network of roadways by Bundesstraße 466. It was also served by the Tälesbahn railroad between 1903 and 1983. Local public transportation is provided by the Filsland Mobilitätsverbundes.
