= Böhmenkirch =

German municipality

- Municipality
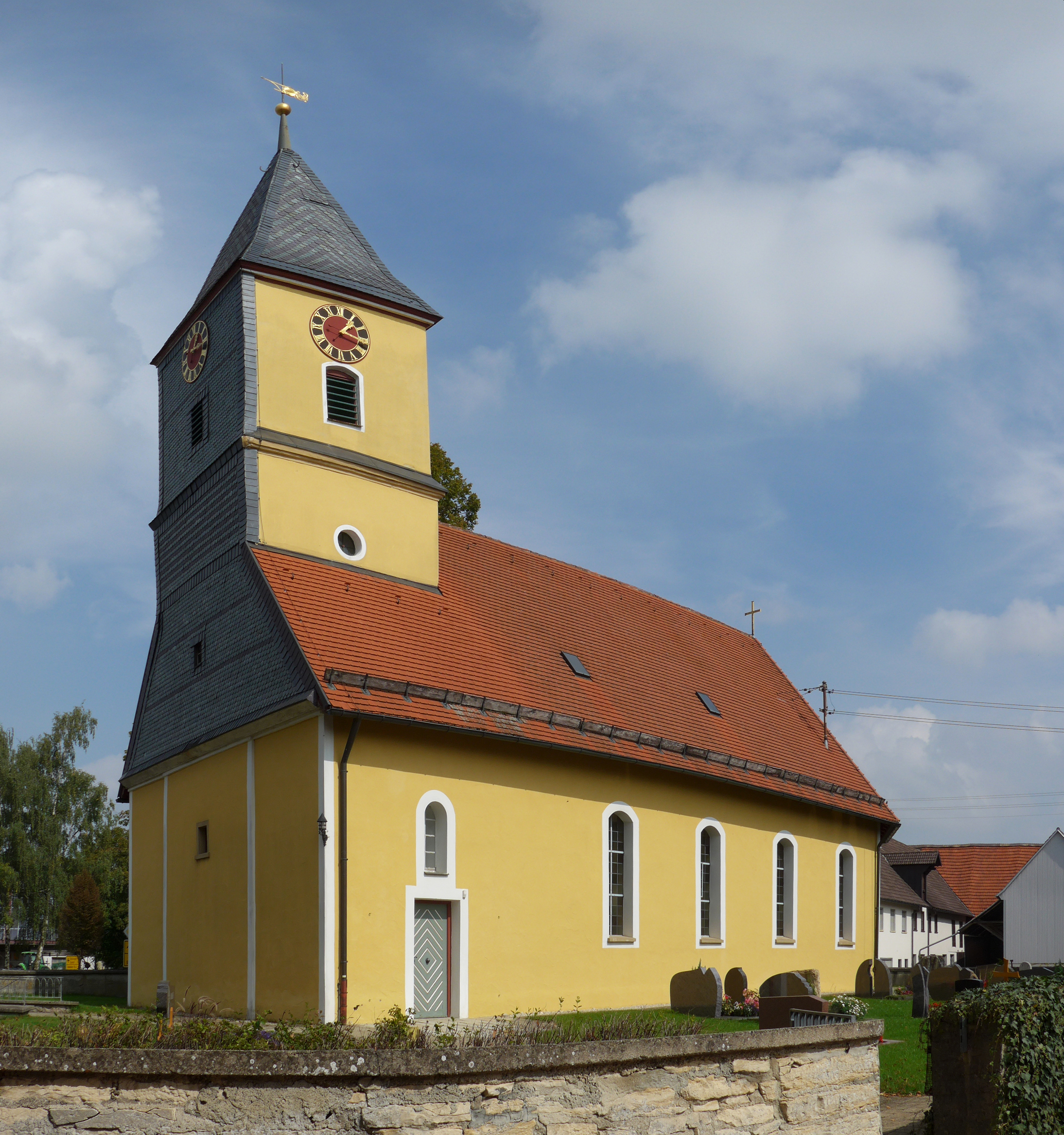
- St. Ulrich's Church, Steinenkirch

- Coat of arms

- Location of Böhmenkirch within Göppingen district
- Interactive map of Böhmenkirch
- Location within Germany Location within Baden-Württemberg
- Coordinates: 48°41′4″N 9°56′02″E
- Country: Germany
- State: Baden-Württemberg
- Admin. region: Stuttgart
- District: Göppingen

Area
  - Total: 51.08 km^{2} (19.72 sq mi)
- Elevation: 696 m (2,283 ft)

Population (2025-12-31)
  - Total: 5,621
  - Density: 110.0/km^{2} (285.0/sq mi)
- Time zone: UTC+01:00 (CET)
  - Summer (DST): UTC+02:00 (CEST)
- Postal codes: 89558
- Dialling codes: 07332
- Vehicle registration: GP
- Website: www.boehmenkirch.de

Böhmenkirch is a municipality in the district of Göppingen in Baden-Württemberg, Germany.

== History ==
Böhmenkirch became a possession of the Electorate of Bavaria in 1806 after it annexed Rechberg and Rothenlöwen, but was in 1810 ceded to the Kingdom of Württemberg. The town was assigned to Oberamt Geislingen until its dissolution in 1938, which resulted in Böhmenkirch being assigned to the district of Göppingen. Böhmenkirch began a period of urban growth after World War II. By the end of the 1960s, there were two new residential areas at the southern edge of the town. An industrial zone was established to the north in the 1970s. Böhmenkirch incorporated the municipalities of Treffelhausen and Schnittlingen in 1973 and Steinenkirch in 1974.

== Geography ==
The municipality (Gemeinde) of Böhmenkirch is found at the eastern edge of the district of Göppingen, along its border with the districts of Ostalbkreis and Heidenheim. All three districts, and by extension Böhmenkirch, are part of Baden-Württemberg, one of the 16 States of the Federal Republic of Germany. Böhmenkirch is physically located in the Albuch and Härtsfeld regions. Elevation above sea level in the municipal area ranges from a high of 746 meters (2,448 ft) Normalnull (NN) to a low of 495 meters (1,624 ft) NN.

A portion of the Federally-protected Eyb, Längenach, and Rohrach river valleys nature reserve is located in Böhmenkirch's municipal area.

== Politics ==
Böhmenkirch has four boroughs (Ortsteile) – Böhmenkirch, Schnittlingen, Steinenkirch, and Treffelhausen – and nine villages: Berg, Hackmesser, Heidhöfe, Lindenhof, Obere Roggenmühle, Ravenstein, Roggensteinhof, Trasenberg, and Ziegelhütte. There are also seven abandoned villages: Boxweiler, Hoebart, Neuhausen, Schönenberg, Siggenweiler, Wintereswanc, Winterreute.

=== Coat of arms ===
The municipal coat of arms for Böhmenkirch displays a wooden church, in yellow upon a field of red. The church is a reference to the municipality's name, Böhmenkirch, or "Bohemian church", and became the municipality's representative motif in 1957 on the suggestion from the Central State Archive in Stuttgart. An image of a tree had since 1924 been the municipal motif. The red-yellow tincture was taken from the House of Rechberg's arms. The municipal coat of arms was approved by the Federal Ministry of the Interior, and a corresponding flag for Böhmenkirch issued, on 4 September 1958.

== Transportation ==
Böhmenkirch lies on the historically important Swabian Jura road and is a stop on the Swabian-Franconian Way of St. James. The municipality is connected to Germany's network of roadways by Bundesstraße 466. Local public transportation is provided by the Filsland Mobilitätsverbundes.
