= Drackenstein =

- Municipality
- Coat of arms

- Location of Drackenstein within Göppingen district
- Interactive map of Drackenstein
- Location within Germany Location within Baden-Württemberg
- Coordinates: 48°33′25″N 9°40′43″E
- Country: Germany
- State: Baden-Württemberg
- Admin. region: Stuttgart
- District: Göppingen

Government
  - Mayor (2019–27): Roland Lang

Area
  - Total: 5.69 km^{2} (2.20 sq mi)
- Elevation: 729 m (2,392 ft)

Population (2025-12-31)
  - Total: 430
  - Density: 76/km^{2} (200/sq mi)
- Time zone: UTC+01:00 (CET)
  - Summer (DST): UTC+02:00 (CEST)
- Postal codes: 73345
- Dialling codes: 07335
- Vehicle registration: GP

Drackenstein is a municipality in the district of Göppingen in Baden-Württemberg in southern Germany.

== Geography ==
=== Geographical location ===
Drackenstein is located on the slope between the Gosbach valley and the plateau of the Swabian Jura, about 25 km away from the district town Göppingen. On the plateau of the Swabian Jura, (karst mountains), in earlier times water was a precious commodity. Therefore, there was in Unterdrackenstein a Hydraulic ram, that pumped water to Oberdrackenstein. By connecting to the Lake Constance water supply in the 20th century these problems belong to the past. At the opposite Drackensteiner Hang the Bundesautobahn 8 runs towards Stuttgart. There was the dragon hole, a cavity, which was filled in during the construction of the motorway. It is believed that the name of the community goes back to a legend of the dragon hole.

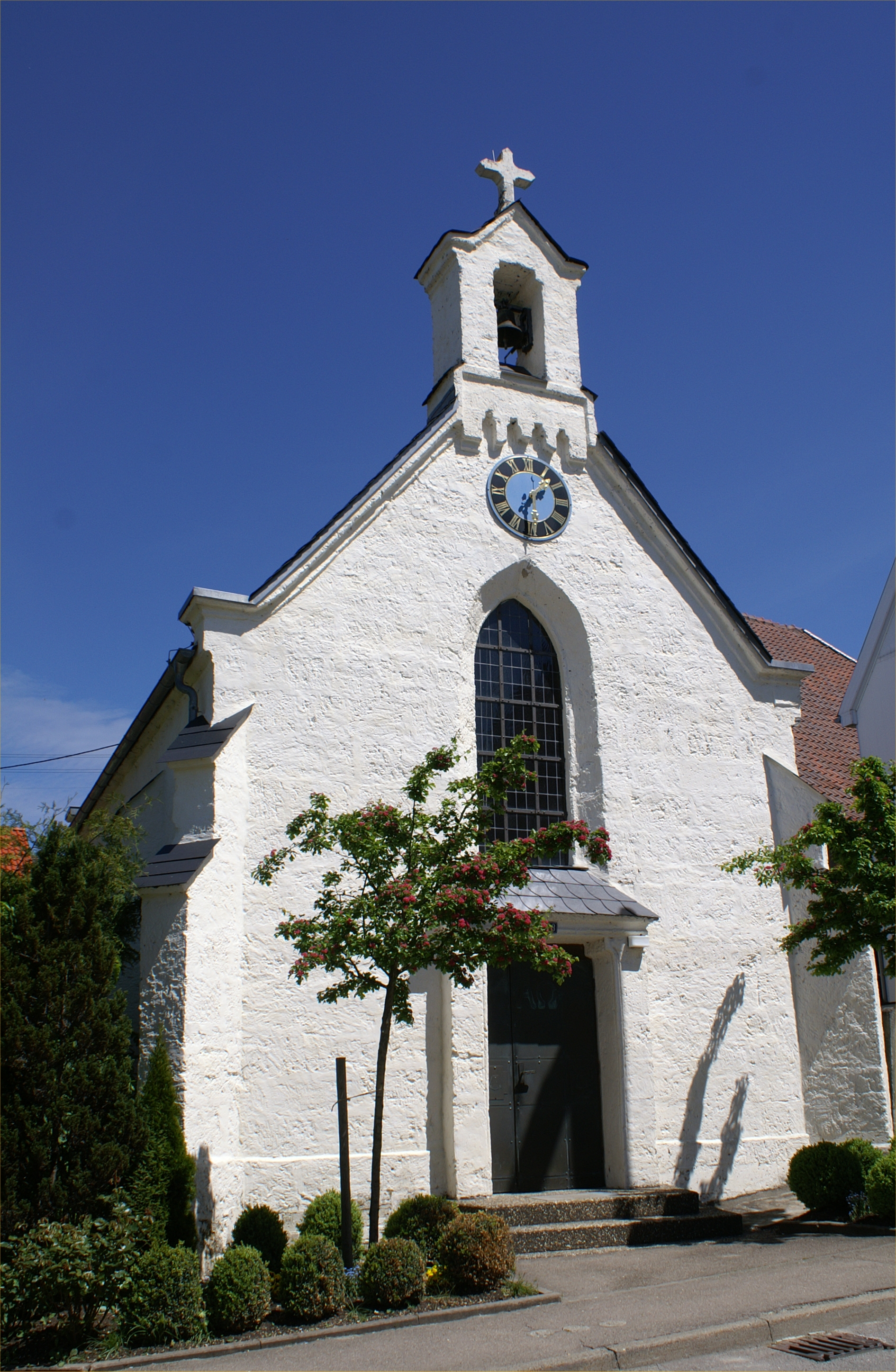
Oberdrackenstein, Church

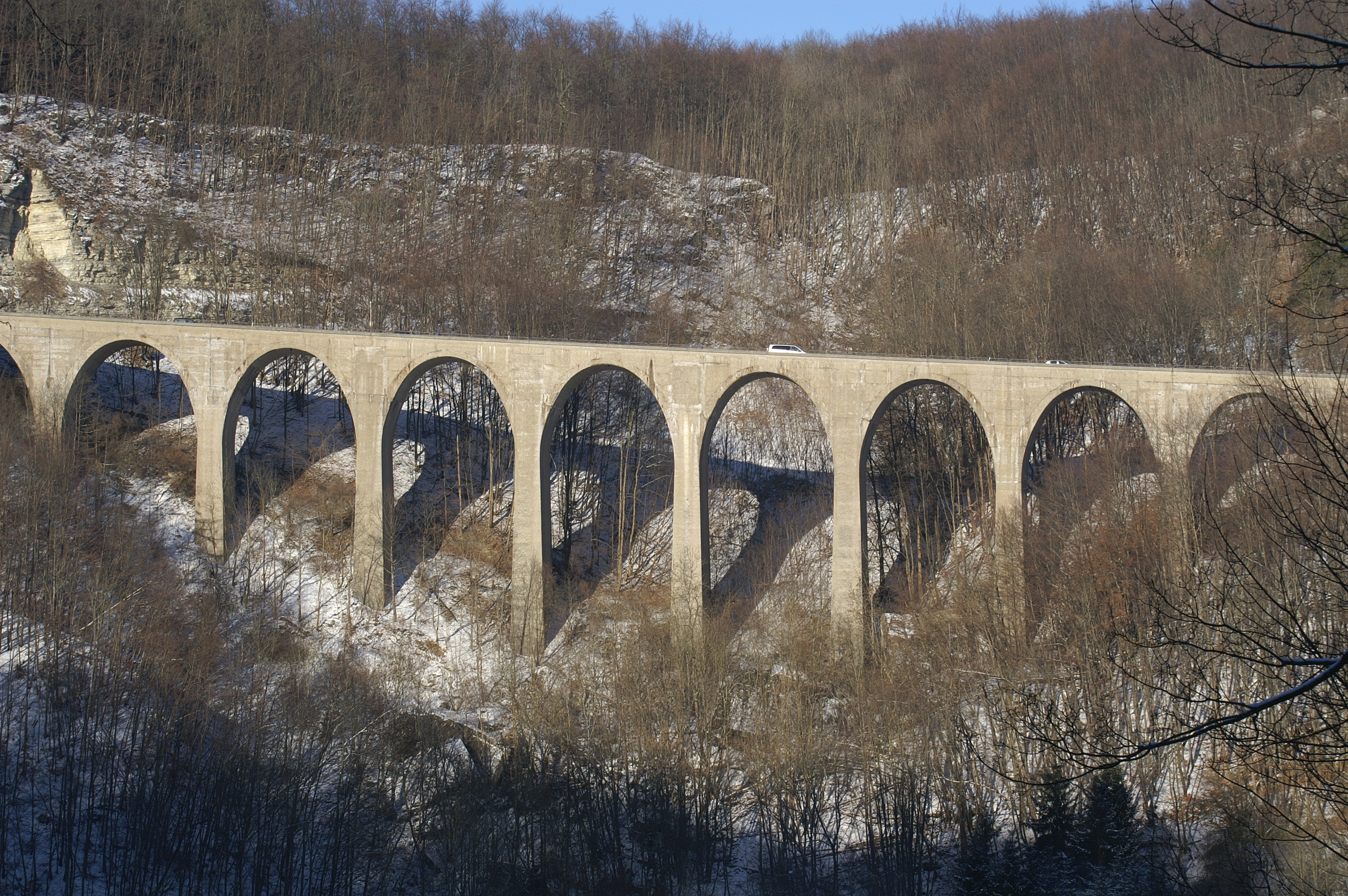
Drackensteiner Hang Autobahn A 8

=== Neighboring communities ===
The municipality borders on Bad Ditzenbach, in the southeast on Merklingen, in the southwest on Hohenstadt and in the west on the town Wiesensteig and the municipality Mühlhausen im Täle. Merklingen belongs to Alb-Donau-district, all others to Göppingen district.

== Municipality arrangement ==
The municipality includes the village Oberdrackenstein, the hamlet Unterdrackenstein and the homestead Kölleshof.

== History ==
Drackenstein was first documented in a chronicle of the Zwiefalten Abbey from the year 1137. See also: Castle Drackenstein

=== Population Development ===
The inhabitants of the community development 1837-2010.

- Date Population
- 1837 257
- 1907 252
- May 17, 1939 305
- September 13, 1950 417
- May 27, 1970 310
- December 31, 1983 346
- December 31, 2000 432
- December 31, 2005 431
- December 31, 2010 437
