= Lauterstein =

German municipality

- Town
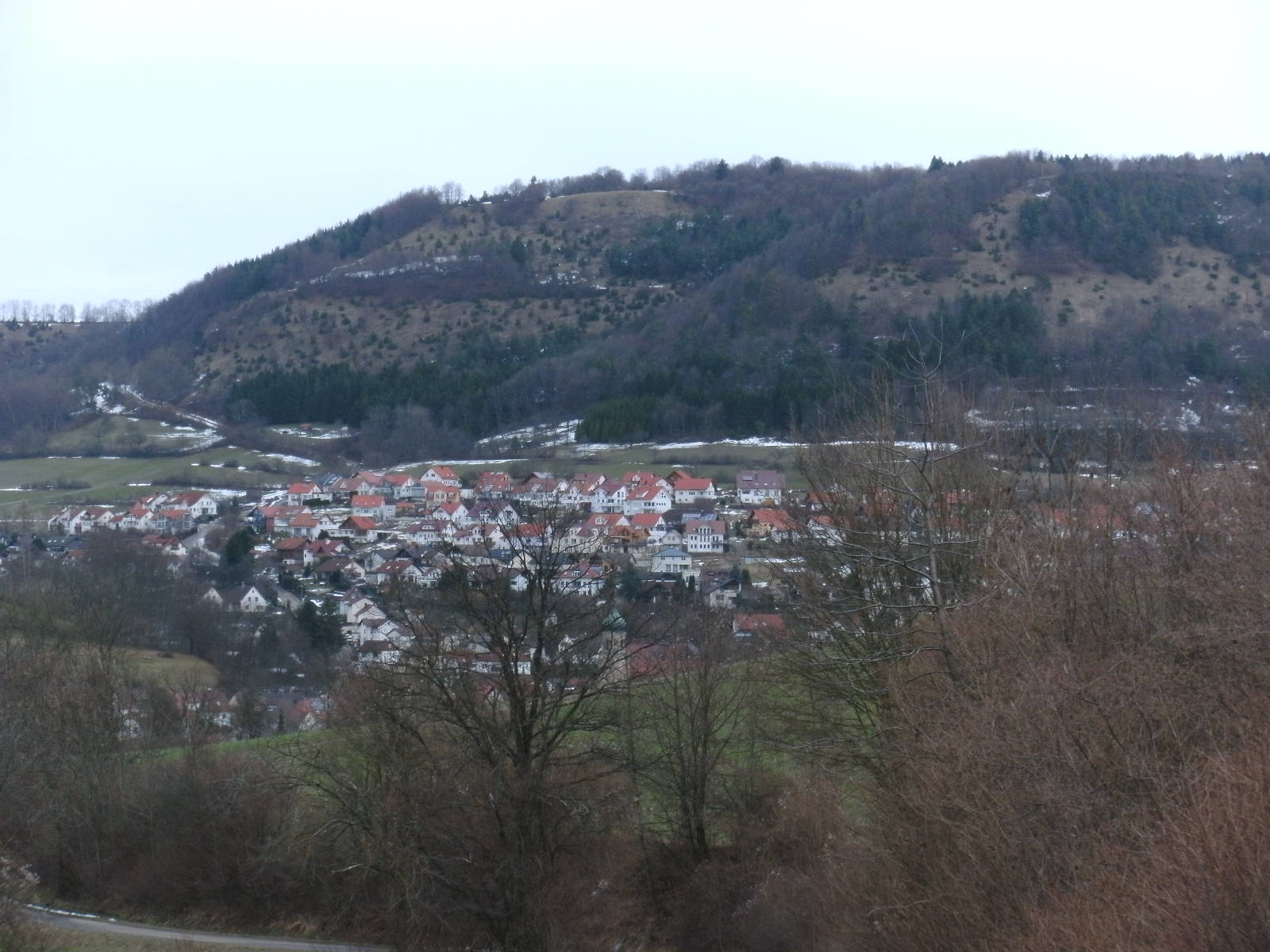
- View of Lauterstein

- Coat of arms

- Location of Lauterstein within Göppingen district
- Interactive map of Lauterstein
- Location within Germany Location within Baden-Württemberg
- Coordinates: 48°42′36″N 9°51′41″E
- Country: Germany
- State: Baden-Württemberg
- Admin. region: Stuttgart
- District: Göppingen

Area
  - Total: 23.31 km^{2} (9.00 sq mi)
- Elevation: 468 m (1,535 ft)

Population (2025-12-31)
  - Total: 2,515
  - Density: 107.9/km^{2} (279.4/sq mi)
- Time zone: UTC+01:00 (CET)
  - Summer (DST): UTC+02:00 (CEST)
- Postal codes: 73111
- Dialling codes: 07332
- Vehicle registration: GP
- Website: www.lauterstein.de

Lauterstein (German: [ˈlaʊtɐʃtaɪn]) is a town of the district of Göppingen in Baden-Württemberg, Germany.

== History ==
The municipality of Lauterstein was formed on 1 January 1974 by the merging of the municipalities of Nenningen and Weißenstein.

== Geography ==
The municipality (Gemeinde) of Lauterstein is found in the district of Göppingen, in Baden-Württemberg, one of the 16 States of the Federal Republic of Germany. Lauterstein lies on the northeast edge of Göppingen's district, along its border with the Ostalb district. The municipal area is physically located in the Albuch and Härtsfeld regions, part of the eastern foothills of the Swabian Jura. Elevation above sea level in the municipal area ranges from a high of 779 meters (2,556 ft) Normalnull (NN) to a low of 440 meters (1,440 ft) NN.

Portions of the Federally-protected Kaltes Feld mit Hornberg, Galgenberg und Eierberg and Heldenberg nature reserves are located in Lauterstein's municipal area.

== Politics ==
Lauterstein has two boroughs (Ortsteile), Nenningen and Weißenstein, and six villages: Albhof, Birkenbuckelweg, Christentalhof, Edelmannshof, Lützelalb, Ruppertsstetten, and Steighof. The abandoned village of Buitingen is also located in the municipal area.

=== Coat of arms ===
The municipal coat of arms for Lauterstein displays a white obelisk flanked to the left by a lion, in red and facing to the right, and a green, winged eagle leg to the right. This pattern combines components of three other coats of arms; the lion is taken from the Lords of Rechberg and previously appeared on the coat of arms of Nenningen, as did the winged eagle foot. The obelisk is a holdover from Weißenstein's coat of arms. Lauterstein's coat of arms was awarded and a corresponding municipal flag issued by the Göppingen district office on 26 September 1978.

== Transportation ==
Local public transportation is provided by the Filsland Mobilitätsverbundes.
