= Tälesbahn (Geislingen–Wiesensteig) =

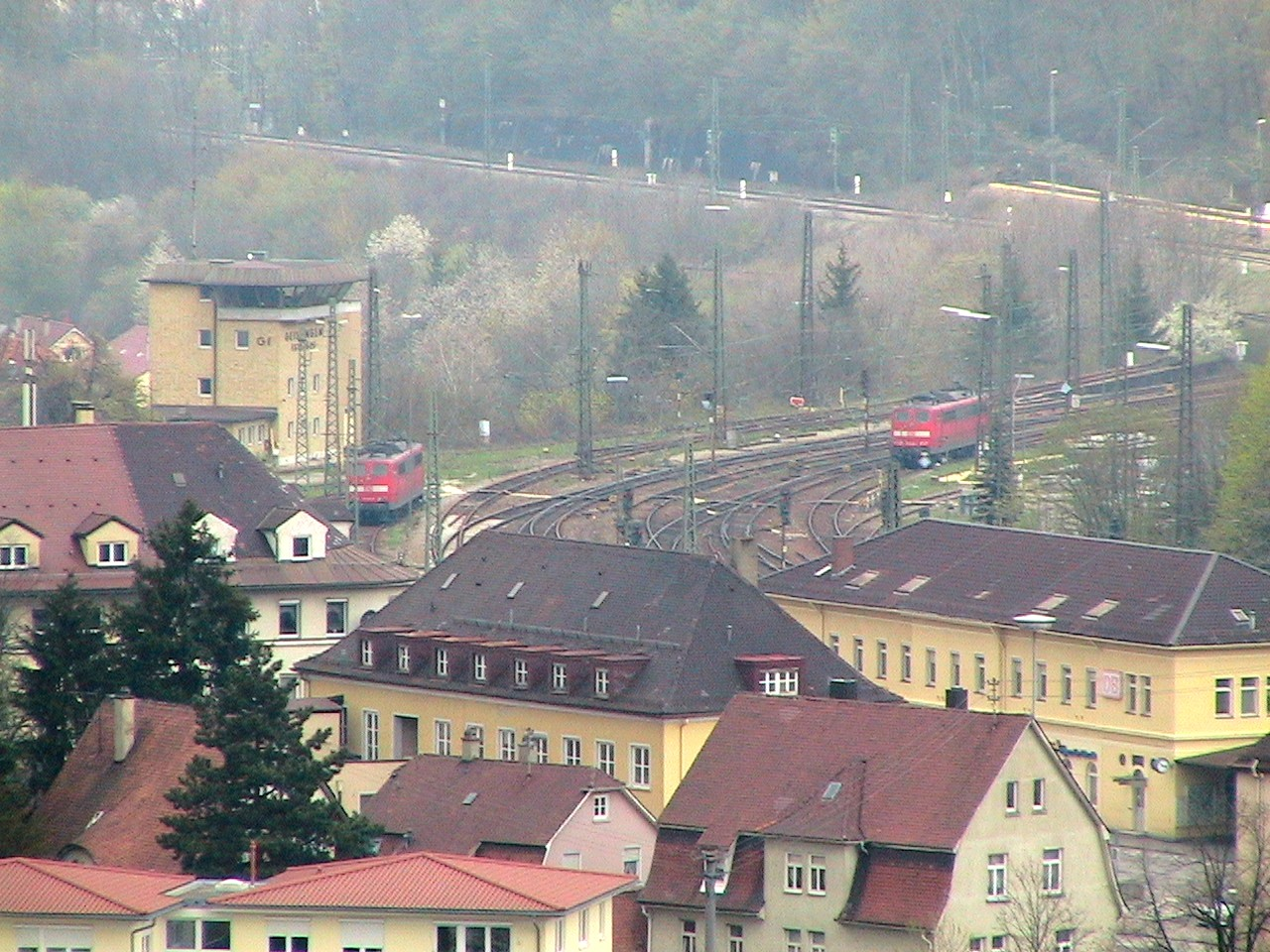
- Geislingen an der Steige station

Overview
- Line number: 4740 (Geislingen (Steige)–Wiesensteig) 4741 (Abzw Helfenstein–Eybtal); 4742 (Geislingen (Steige) West–Eybtal) 4743 (Eybtal–Geislingen (Steige))

Service
- Route number: 904

Technical
- Line length: 21.26 km (13.21 mi)
- Track gauge: 1,435 mm (4 ft 8 1/2 in)
- Minimum radius: 200 m (656 ft)
- Maximum incline: 1:37 = 2.7 %

Tälesbahn was a standard gauge railway in Baden-Württemberg, Germany.

== History ==
The branch line from Geislingen an der Steige to Wiesensteig was inaugurated on 21 October 1903. In the early years the Tälesbahn served primarily for passenger transport and the transport of goods for the holdings situated in the region. The section from Geislingen to Stauferstollen was electrified since 12 December 1937 due to the heavy ore trains.

== Decommissioning ==
The section from Deggingen to Wiesensteig was shut down in 1968 for passengers and freight. Until Deggingen passenger traffic was maintained until 1 June 1980, the freight transport to 29 September 1981. To mark the 150th anniversary of the Geislinger Steige in 2000, tours with the local train, run by the railway friends of Ulm-Amstetten, from Geislingen station to Geislingen-Altenstadt were offered. In December of the same year the railway traffic was finally stopped, and the track was shut down completely.

== Relicts ==
In Bad Überkingen the route is overbuilt, but a bicycle track is located on the route to Wiesensteig.

== Literature ==
- Peter-Michael Mihailescu; Matthias Michalke (1985). Vergessene Bahnen in Baden-Württemberg [Forgotten tracks in Baden-Württemberg] (in German). Stuttgart: Konrad Theiss Verlag. pp. 219–222. ISBN 3-8062-0413-6.
- Rudolf P. Pavel: Geislinger Steige und Täleskätter – württembergische Eisenbahngeschichte, Pavel, Neckargerach [ca. 1982]
