= Kuchen, Baden-Württemberg =

German municipality

Kuchen
- Municipality
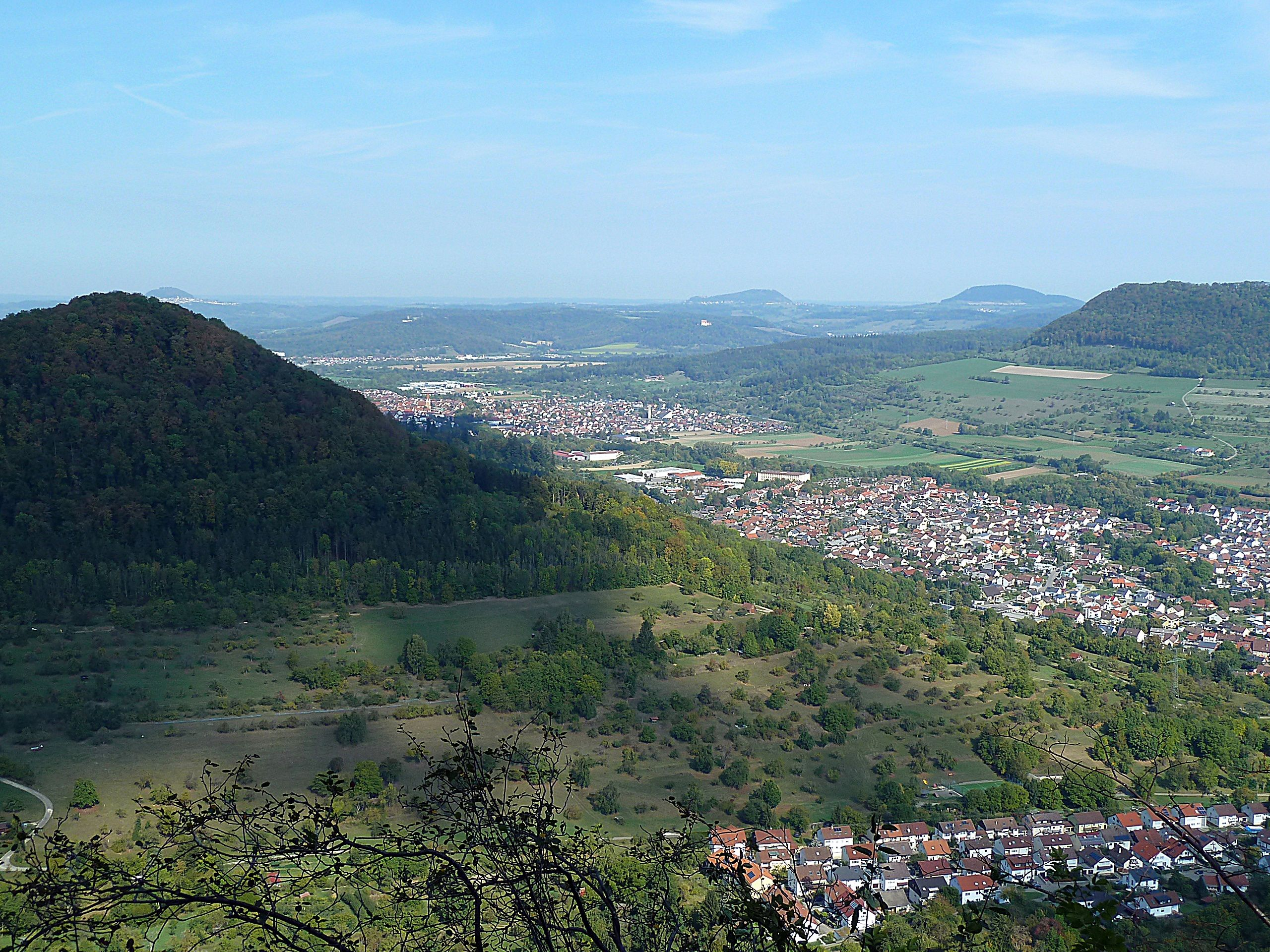
- View of Kuchen from the Ramsfelsen

- Coat of arms

- Location of Kuchen within Göppingen district
- Interactive map of Kuchen
- Location within Germany Location within Baden-Württemberg
- Coordinates: 48°38′21″N 9°47′57″E
- Country: Germany
- State: Baden-Württemberg
- Admin. region: Stuttgart
- District: Göppingen

Area
  - Total: 8.95 km^{2} (3.46 sq mi)
- Elevation: 407 m (1,335 ft)

Population (2025-12-31)
  - Total: 5,481
  - Density: 612/km^{2} (1,590/sq mi)
- Time zone: UTC+01:00 (CET)
  - Summer (DST): UTC+02:00 (CEST)
- Postal codes: 73329
- Dialling codes: 07331
- Vehicle registration: GP
- Website: www.kuchen.de

Kuchen (German pronunciation: [ˈkuːxn̩]) is a municipality of the district of Göppingen in Baden-Württemberg, Germany.

== History ==
The earliest historical documentation of Kuchen, from between 1304 and 1315, refers to it as a "town" (stadt), implying that it received town rights from the Count of Helfenstein in the first half of the 13th century. Kuchen was made a market town in 1356. At some point between the years 1382 and 1396, Kuchen became a possession of the Free Imperial City of Ulm. Ulm and by extension Kuchen was annexed by the Electorate of Bavaria in 1802, but was ceded in 1810 to the Kingdom of Württemberg and then assigned to Oberamt Geislingen. The Fils Valley Railway was constructed through Kuchen in 1845. Kuchen was reassigned in 1938 to the newly-reorganized district of Göppingen. The town grew in every direction after World War II, and then again in the 1970s to the northeast.

== Geography ==
The municipality (Gemeinde) of Kuchen is situated in the district of Göppingen, in Baden-Württemberg, one of the 16 States of the Federal Republic of Germany. Kuchen is physically located in the valley of the Fils, in the central foothills of the Swabian Jura. Elevation above sea level in the municipal area ranges from a high of 726 meters (2,382 ft) Normalnull (NN) to a low of 385 meters (1,263 ft) NN.

== Politics ==
Kuchen has one borough (Ortsteil), Kuchen, and one minor administrative area, Süddeutsche Baumwolleindustrie. There are three abandoned villages in the municipal area: Böldlinshof, Seelhofen, and Spitzenberg.

== Demographics ==
Population development:

Year	Inhabitants
1990	5786
2001	5741
2011	5539
2021	5677

== Coat of arms ==
Kuchen's coat of arms is divided party per fess into an upper, red half and a lower, white half. In the upper half is a white elephant standing upon a yellow, four-pointed hill, which is a reference to the House of Helfenstein. The lower half contains a red, five-petaled rose with green sepals, taken from the arms of Geislingen an der Steige, a town Kuchen has centuries of shared history with. This coat of arms first appeared in town seals created after 1930. It was approved by the Federal Ministry of the Interior and a corresponding municipal flag issued on 16 February 1959.

== Transportation ==
Kuchen is connected to Germany's network of roadways by Bundesstraße 10 and its system of railroads by Fils Valley Railway. Local public transportation is provided by the Filsland Mobilitätsverbundes.
