= Ottenbach, Baden-Württemberg =

Ottenbach
- Municipality
- Coat of arms

- Location of Ottenbach within Göppingen district
- Interactive map of Ottenbach
- Location within Germany Location within Baden-Württemberg
- Coordinates: 48°44′5″N 9°44′52″E
- Country: Germany
- State: Baden-Württemberg
- Admin. region: Stuttgart
- District: Göppingen

Government
  - Mayor (2018–26): Florin Joos (Volt)

Area
  - Total: 11.90 km^{2} (4.59 sq mi)
- Elevation: 399 m (1,309 ft)

Population (2025-12-31)
  - Total: 2,355
  - Density: 197.9/km^{2} (512.6/sq mi)
- Time zone: UTC+01:00 (CET)
  - Summer (DST): UTC+02:00 (CEST)
- Postal codes: 73113
- Dialling codes: 07165
- Vehicle registration: GP
- Website: www.ottenbach.de

Ottenbach is a municipality in the district of Göppingen in Baden-Württemberg in southern Germany.

== Geographical location ==
Ottenbach is located in the upper valley of the Krumm between the mountains Hohenstaufen in west-northwest, the Rechberg in the northeast and the Stuifen, on the foothills of the eastern Swabian Jura. From the county town Göppingen the distance is in a straight line approximately eight kilometers northeast and about as far southwest from Schwäbisch Gmünd.

== Municipality arrangement ==
Ottenbach includes the village Ottenbach, the Weiler Geyrenwald, Jackenhof, Kitzen, Schurrenhof and Stixenhöfe, die Höfe Bärenhöfe, Breitfelder Hof, Cyriakushof, Etzberg, Feuerleshof, Fladenhof, Haldenhof, Herbenhof, Holzhäuser Hof, Kübelhof, Lindenhöfe, Lochhof, Merzenhöfe, Neuhof, Obergruppenhof, Obermühleisenhof, Peterlingshöfe, Saurenhof, Schonterhöfe, Sonnental (Fuchstal), Strudelhof, Untermühleisenhöfe, Waldenhof and Wannenhof and the house Schafhöfle.

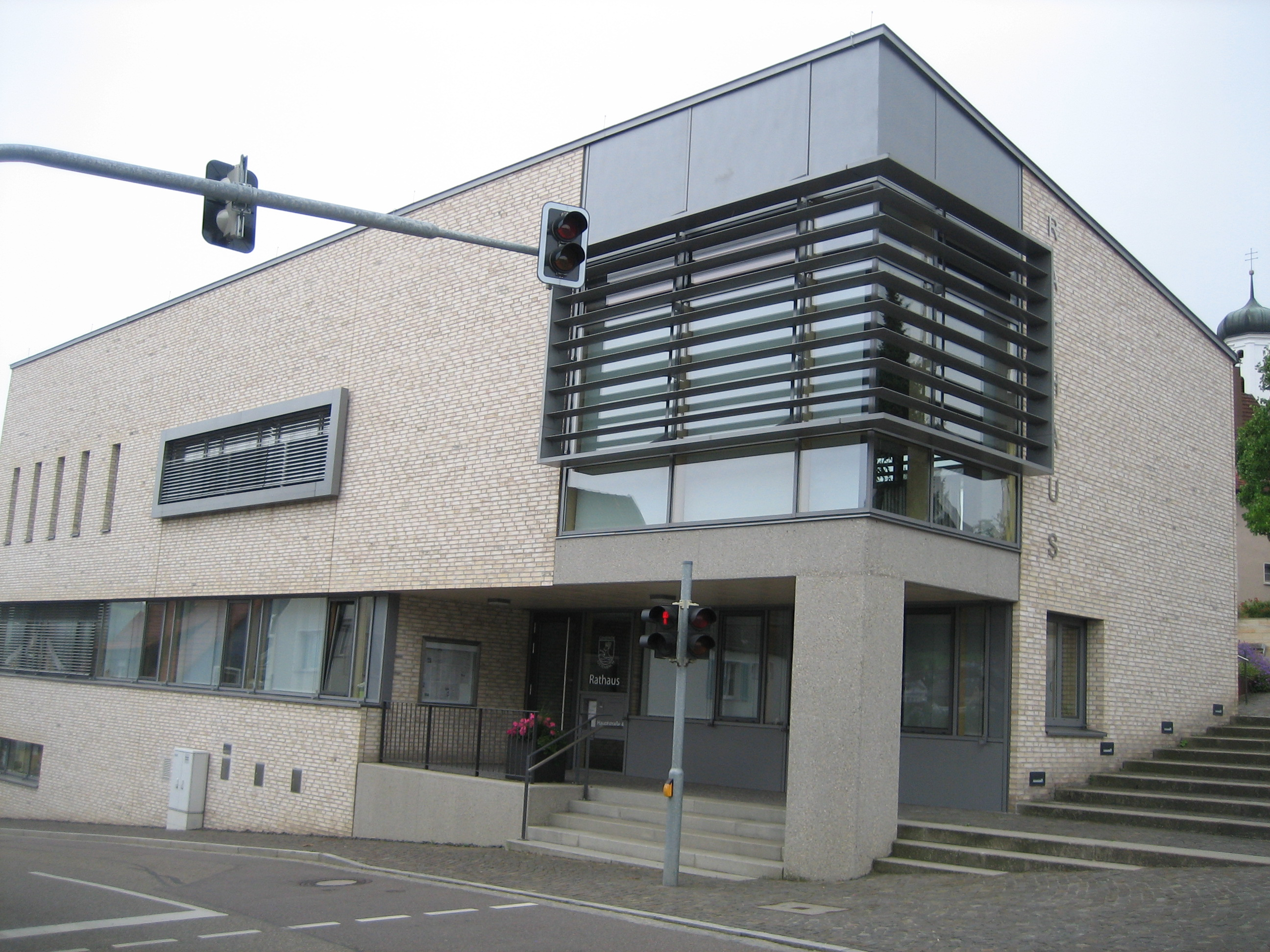
Town hall Ottenbach district Göppingen

== Sports ==
Cycling: Nationally known is Ottenbach for the organization and conduct of mass sports bike marathon "Alb-extreme". The itinerary leads annually on the last Sunday in June over a distance of 190, 210 and 260 km through the countryside of the Swabian Jura with many elevations.

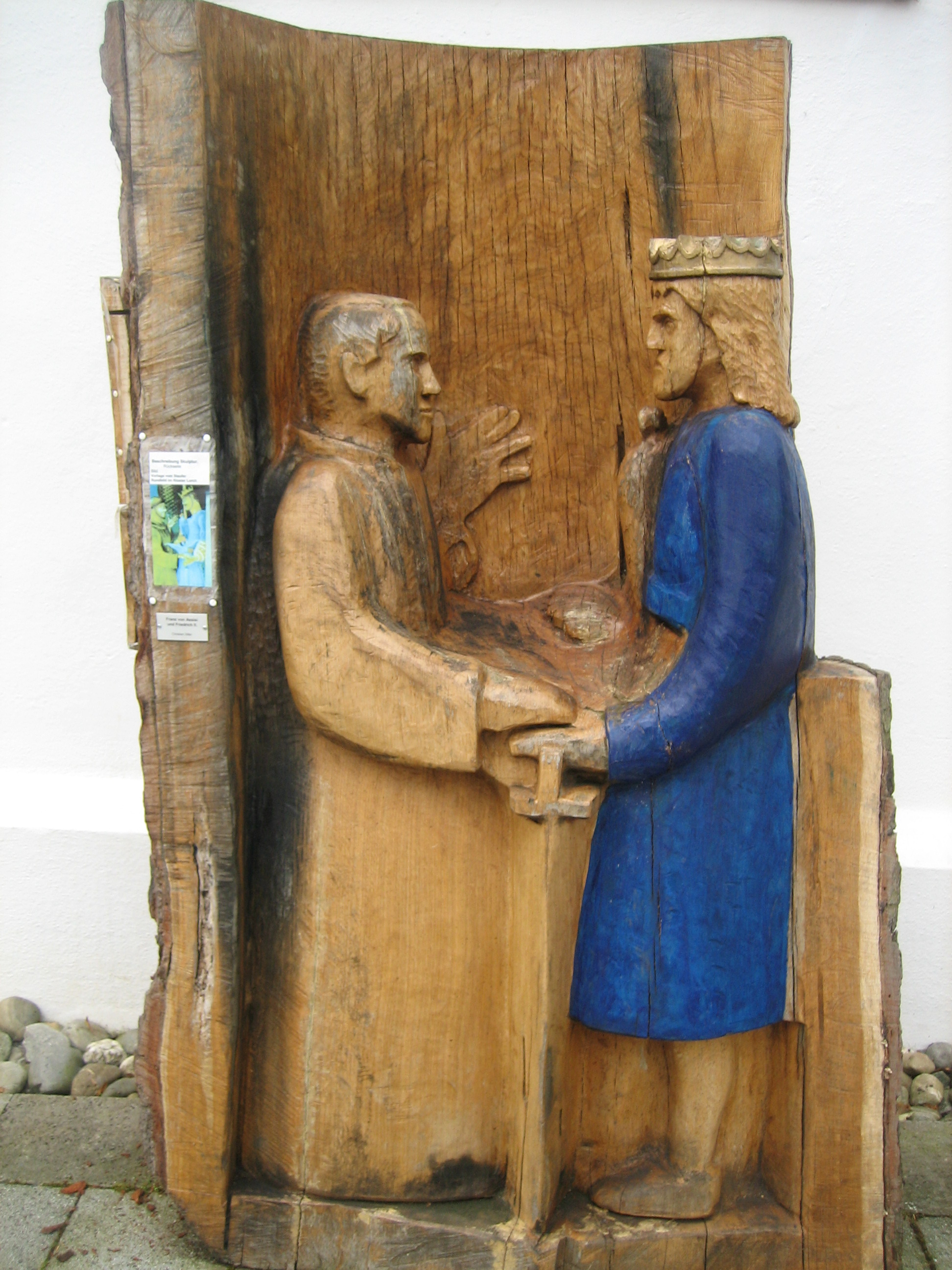
Ottenbach St. Sebastian church patrons Cyriakus und Gangolf

== Economy and Infrastructure ==
=== Transportation ===
Ottenbach has no train station, but is integrated via the bus line 6 with several stops in Ottenbach in the Filsland-bus network.

=== Education ===
In Ottenbach there is a primary school, all secondary schools can be found in surrounding communities or cities. Secondary schools are in Eislingen and Göppingen.

== Sons and daughters of the town ==
- Bruno Klaus (1848-1915), teacher and local historian, honorary citizen of Schwäbisch Gmünd
- Arthur Mayer (1911-1998), psychologist
