= Gruibingen =

- Municipality
- Coat of arms

- Location of Gruibingen within Göppingen district
- Interactive map of Gruibingen
- Location within Germany Location within Baden-Württemberg
- Coordinates: 48°35′41″N 9°38′34″E
- Country: Germany
- State: Baden-Württemberg
- Admin. region: Stuttgart
- District: Göppingen

Government
  - Mayor (2020–28): Roland Schweikert

Area
  - Total: 23.05 km^{2} (8.90 sq mi)
- Elevation: 565 m (1,854 ft)

Population (2025-12-31)
  - Total: 2,226
  - Density: 96.57/km^{2} (250.1/sq mi)
- Time zone: UTC+01:00 (CET)
  - Summer (DST): UTC+02:00 (CEST)
- Postal codes: 73344
- Dialling codes: 07335
- Vehicle registration: GP
- Website: www.gruibingen.de

Gruibingen is a municipality in the district of Göppingen in Baden-Württemberg in southern Germany.

== Geographical location ==
Gruibingen is located between Stuttgart and Ulm in front of the Swabian Jura in a tributary of the Fils. The Bundesautobahn 8 leads east of the village.

== Municipality arrangement ==
Gruibingen includes the village Gruibingen, the farm Kaltenwanghof, the house Exenmühle and the dialed villages Chaldenwank and Ulrichstetten (?).

== History ==
Archaeological excavations in the St. Martin Church show that the colonisation of the valley Gruibingen goes back to the Early Middle Ages. Traces of settlement from the Merovingian-and Carolingian period can be found just north of St. Martin's Church and at the northern end of the village, which refers to an original polycentric settlement structure. Gruibingen was first documented in the year 861. In a foundation letter the monastery of Wiesensteig was referred as lying "in griubingaro marco". Nevertheless, succeeded none of these manors, to establish a local rule. Gruibingen decreed continue over the high courts, an own measure and an ancient market right. In the 15th century it was even called Freidorf what shows the significance of Gruibingen. During the Reformation, the place became as part Württemberg evangelical. So Gruibingen became a belief boundary between the Protestant and Catholic confession. During the Thirty Years' War (1618–1648), there was poverty and misery. From the effects of war, pestilence and disease died 131 men. Towards the end of the war in 1647, the village was looted and torched. 130 houses and barns burned down. Already 21 years later there was another fire disaster, which was triggered by a village blacksmith. Seven people died in the flames. The location could not grow back to its original size, and in 1712 it was even said that no road runs through the place. The economic conditions were largely limited to a smallholder agriculture and few craftsmen. Only in the 20th century, economic opportunities were offered outside of agriculture. Since the Second World War Gruibingen developed into a village with good infrastructure, several craft shops and medium-sized enterprises. see also Castle Gruibingen

== Airfield Gruibingen-Nortel ==
Even before the Second World War was on the district the Gruibingen glider area Gruibingen-Nortel. It serves today for the Aero Club Göppingen Salach as home.

== Educational institutions ==
In Gruibingen there is only one primary school. Schools need to be visited in the neighboring villages. For the children there is a community-owned kindergarten.

== Buildings ==
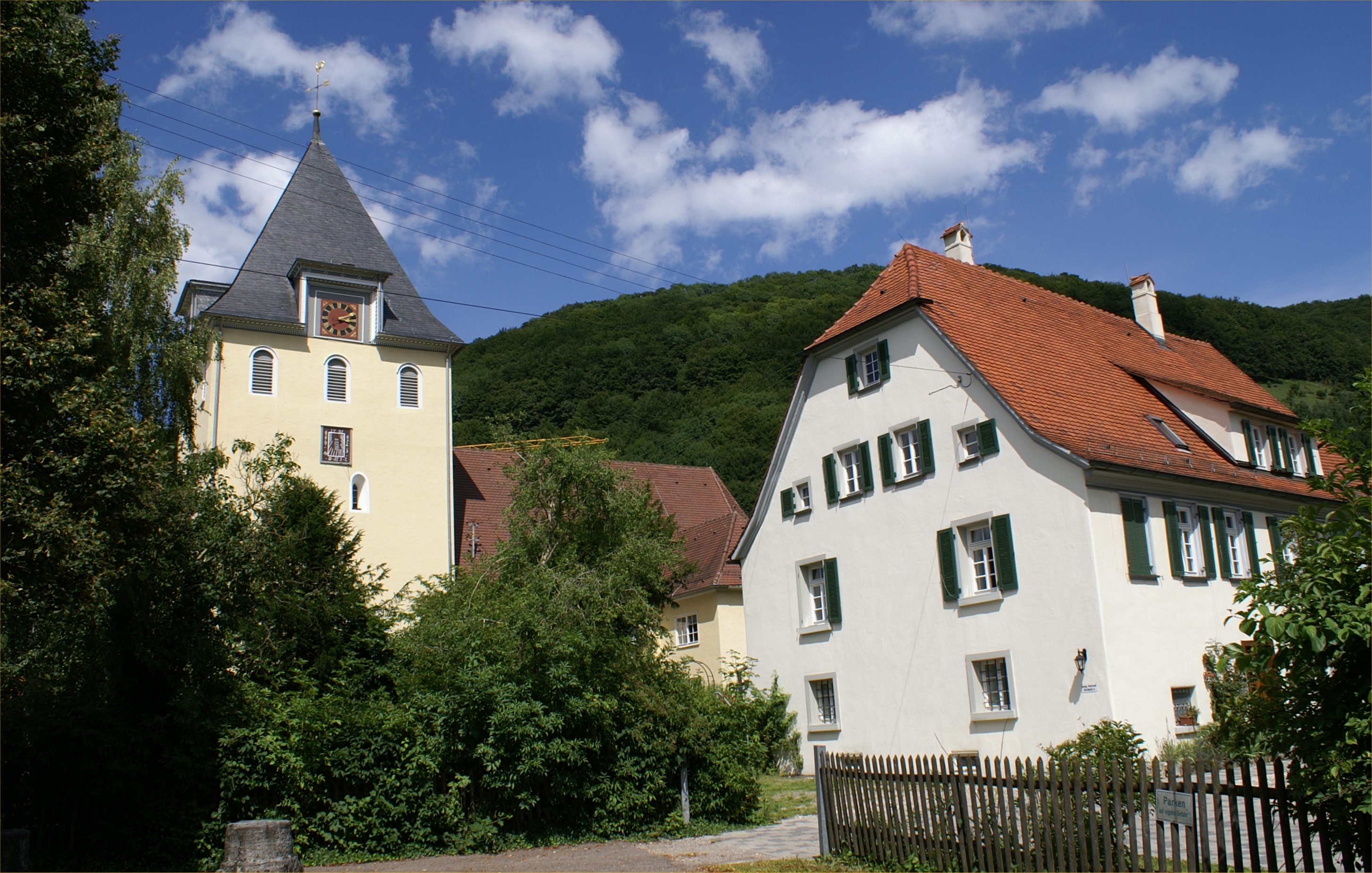
Gruibingen Church and Rectory

- The Martin Church with lower village

Ev. Martin Church: The massive, square west tower was probably built mainly in the 12th century. The Aisleless church holds important murals dating from the early 14th century until the 15th century.

- Rasthaus Gruibingen: 2003 was built on the A 8, the first following the principles of Feng Shui, equipped motorway service of Europe.

== Personality ==
=== Sons and daughters of the town ===
- Johann Christoph Albert Moll (1817–1895), physician and medical historian
- Gustav Heinrich Lamparter (1826–1898), bailiff, district president in Ulm
- Jochen Stutzky (born 1980), football commentator and television presenter
- Bruno Ensslen, painter

== Flavours ==
Gruibingen is famous for its beer. 1728 Lamm brewery Hilsenbeck was first mentioned. (under the name Allmendinger). The naturally cloudy beer has an original wort content of 12.5% and is bottled directly from the storage cellar and not filtered before.

== Literature ==
- Werner Unseld, Walter Friess, J. Böhringer: Auf dr Gass ond hinterm Haus - Gruibingen um 1935 in Photographien von Walter Frieß . Bildband. Konrad, Weissenhorn 1994, ISBN 3-87437-364-9.
