= Göppingen (district) =

Coordinates: 48.7°N 9.65°E

- District
- Flag Coat of arms
- Country: Germany
- State: Baden-Württemberg
- Adm. region: Stuttgart
- Capital: Göppingen

Government
  - District admin.: Edgar Wolff (FW)

Area
  - Total: 642.35 km^{2} (248.01 sq mi)

Population (31 December 2023)
  - Total: 259,232
  - Density: 400/km^{2} (1,000/sq mi)
- Time zone: UTC+01:00 (CET)
  - Summer (DST): UTC+02:00 (CEST)
- Vehicle registration: GP
- Website: www.landkreis-goeppingen.de

Göppingen is a Landkreis (district) in the middle of Baden-Württemberg, Germany. Neighboring districts are Rems-Murr, Ostalbkreis, Heidenheim, Alb-Donau, Reutlingen and Esslingen.

== History ==
In 1817, Württemberg was divided into four kreise (districts), the southeastern one of which was named Donaukreis. The four kreise were in turn divided into oberämter. In Donaukreis, the most northern of the oberämter were Göppingen and to its east Geislingen. In 1938, the four kreise were abolished, and Geislingen was merged with Göppingen. During the communal reform of 1973 the district was not changed much, with only a few municipalities from the districts Schwäbisch Gmünd and Ulm were added.

The district is sometimes called Stauferkreis because the Staufen family had their roots in the area. However, when the family had no more heirs, it became part of Württemberg in the 14th century.

== Partnerships ==
In 1990 a partnership with the district Löbau (now merged into the district of Görlitz) in Saxony was started, to help to build the administration according to western German standards. The municipality Boll already had a partnership with Herrnhut in Löbau before. After the districts started their partnership, several other municipalities of the two districts started partnership as well.

== Geography ==
The district is located in the northern foothills of the Swabian Jura (Schwäbische Alb). It is crossed by the Fils, a tributary of the Neckar.

== Coat of arms ==
The lion is the symbol of the Staufen family, which had its roots in the district. The deer antler above is the symbol of Württemberg and symbolizes the change of ownership after the Staufer family died out.

== Cities and municipalities ==
Clickable map of towns and municipalities in the district

Cities
1. Donzdorf
2. Ebersbach an der Fils
3. Eislingen
4. Geislingen an der Steige
5. Göppingen
6. Lauterstein
7. Süßen
8. Uhingen
9. Wiesensteig
Administrative districts
1. Deggingen
2. Ebersbach
3. Eislingen-Ottenbach-Salach
4. Geislingen
5. Göppingen
6. Mittleres Fils-Lautertal
7. Oberes Filstal
8. Östlicher Schurwald
9. Raum Bad Boll
10. Uhingen
11. Voralb
Municipalities
1. Adelberg
2. Aichelberg
3. Albershausen
4. Bad Ditzenbach
5. Bad Überkingen
6. Birenbach
7. Böhmenkirch
8. Börtlingen
9. Boll
10. Deggingen
11. Drackenstein
12. Dürnau
13. Eschenbach (Göppingen)
14. Gammelshausen
15. Gingen an der Fils
16. Gruibingen

17. Hattenhofen
18. Heiningen
19. Hohenstadt
20. Kuchen
21. Mühlhausen im Täle
22. Ottenbach
23. Rechberghausen
24. Salach
25. Schlat
26. Schlierbach (Göppingen)
27. Wäschenbeuren
28. Wangen (Göppingen)
29. Zell unter Aichelberg
