= Wiesensteig =

- Town
- Coat of arms

- Location of Wiesensteig within Göppingen district
- Interactive map of Wiesensteig
- Location within Germany Location within Baden-Württemberg
- Coordinates: 48°33′42″N 9°37′31″E
- Country: Germany
- State: Baden-Württemberg
- Admin. region: Stuttgart
- District: Göppingen

Government
  - Mayor (2018–26): Gebhard Tritschler

Area
  - Total: 23.41 km^{2} (9.04 sq mi)
- Elevation: 592 m (1,942 ft)

Population (2025-12-31)
  - Total: 2,030
  - Density: 86.7/km^{2} (225/sq mi)
- Time zone: UTC+01:00 (CET)
  - Summer (DST): UTC+02:00 (CEST)
- Postal codes: 73349
- Dialling codes: 07335
- Vehicle registration: GP
- Website: www.wiesensteig.de

Wiesensteig in Göppingen (district)

Wiesensteig (German pronunciation: [ˈviːzn̩ˌʃtaɪk]) is a town in the district of Göppingen in Baden-Württemberg in southern Germany. It is located on the river Fils, 16 km south of Göppingen.

== Geography ==
=== Geographical location ===
Wiesensteig is located in the upper Fils valley in 575–750 meters altitude in Göppingen (district). At the edge of the town passes Bundesautobahn 8 to Ulm.

=== Constituent communities ===
To Wiesensteig belongs the town of Wiesensteig, the courtyards Bläsiberg, Eckhöfe, Heidental, Reußenstein and Ziegelhof and the houses Lämmerbuckel, Papiermühle and the dialed towns Michelnbuch and Schafhaus

=== Neighbouring communities ===
Adjacent municipalities are Gruibingen in the north, Mühlhausen im Täle in the northeast, Drackenstein in the east, Hohenstadt in the south east, Westerheim (Alb-Donau-Kreis) in the south, Römerstein (Reutlingen (district)) in the southwest, Lenningen in the west, and Neidlingen (both Esslingen (district)) in the northwest.

== History ==
Wiesensteig was first mentioned in 861 in a document, as there was founded a Benedictine monastery.

The town has the town privileges since 1356. It was then under the House of Helfenstein. Since 1512, the rule Wiesensteig was assigned to the Swabian Circle within the Holy Roman Empire.

Count Ulrich XVII of Helfenstein (1524-1570) and his brother Sebastian († 1564) introduced in 1555 the Lutheran confession in Wiesensteig. 1562/63 in the rule Wiesensteig a great witch-hunt took place in which at least 63 women and men were executed.

After the extinction of the House of Helfenstein in 1627 the Reich County Wiesensteig fell about two-thirds in 1642 by purchase to Altbayern and one third to the House of Fürstenberg (Swabia). Through a land swap the town came in 1806 to the Kingdom of Württemberg and became the seat of Oberamt Wiesensteig.

=== Population development ===
The number of inhabitants between 1837 and 2010.

Date	Inhabitants
1837	1.496
1907	1.327
17 May 1939	1.683
13 September 1950	2.063
27 May 1970	2.632
31 December 1983	2.490
31 December 2005	2.312
31 December 2010	2.138

== Politics ==
=== Council and mayor ===
The local council of Wiesensteig has since the local elections in Baden-Württemberg May 25, 2014 12 members, including two women.

The mayor Gebhard Tritschler (independent) was elected in 2010, and re-elected in 2018.

== Traffic ==
About the Landesstraße 1200 Wiesensteig has connection to the Bundesstraße B 466 and to the Bundesautobahn A 8. Wiesensteig is located on the Swabian Jura Route.

From 1903 to 1968, Wiesensteig was connected by the "Tälesbahn" (Geislingen-Wiesensteig) to the national rail network.

== Education ==
With the Franz Xaver Messerschmidt School Wiesensteig has a primary and a high school with Werkrealschule.

== Things ==
=== Buildings ===
- Residence of the Helfensteiner (1551)
- St. Cyriakus (1466) with Weigle organ of 1849
- Market with elephant fountain and half-timbered houses
- Kreuzkapelle north of Wiesensteig on the Alb plateau, the walk to the chapel is lined with stations of the Cross
- Reussenstein Castle, about 5 km northwest of Wiesensteig

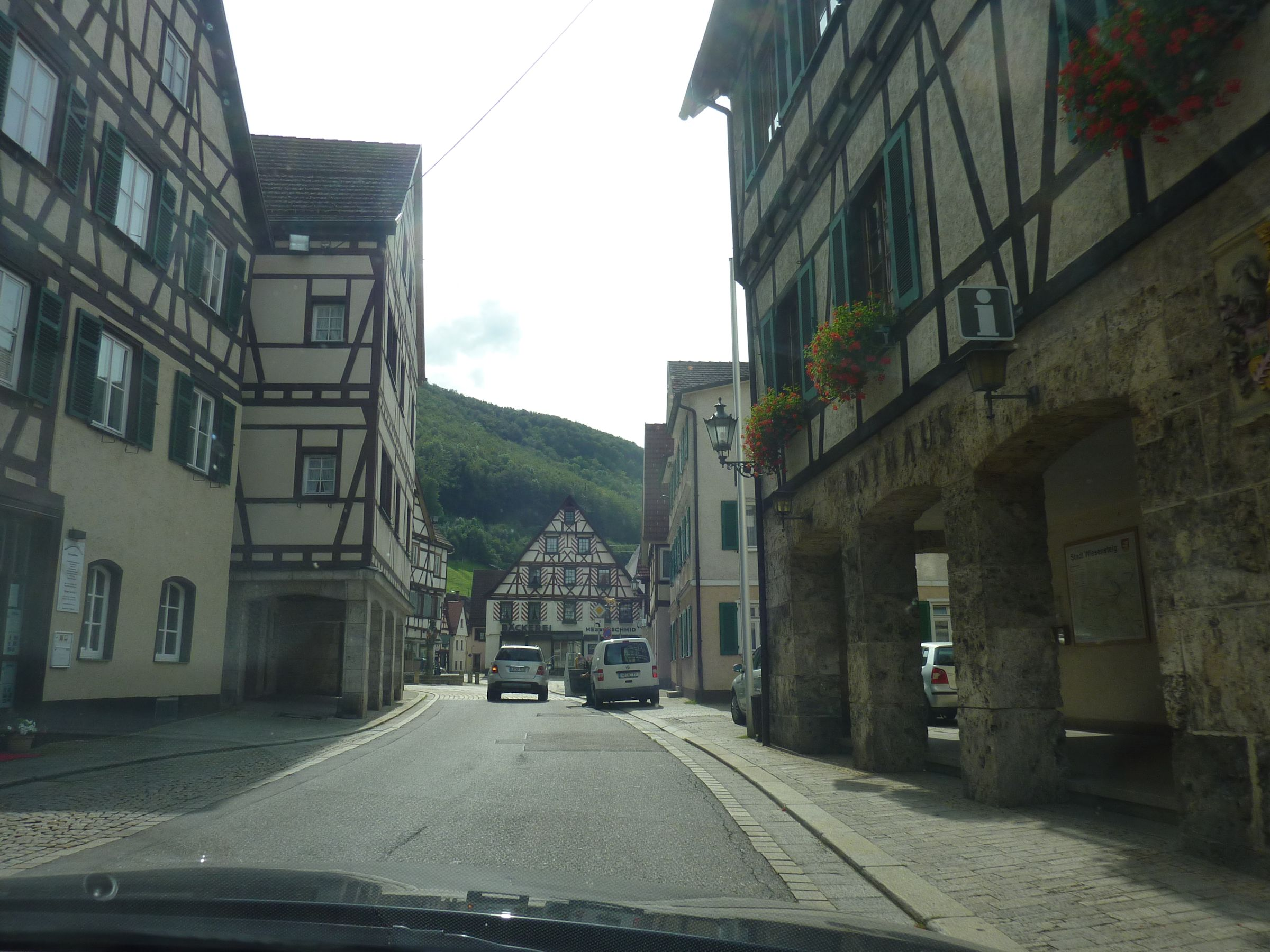
Wiesensteig stationary transit

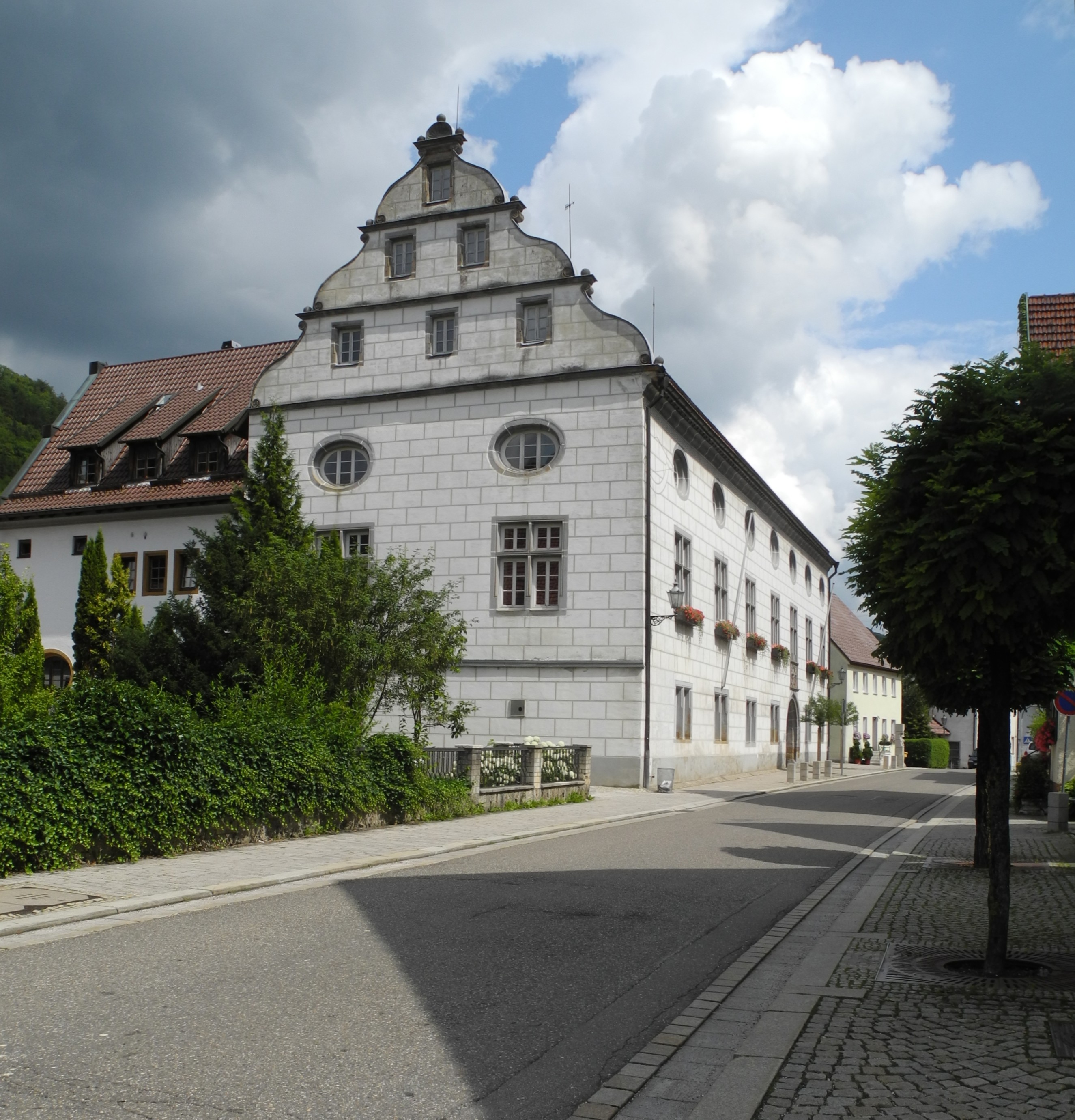
Wiesensteig - Castle of Helfenstein (1551)

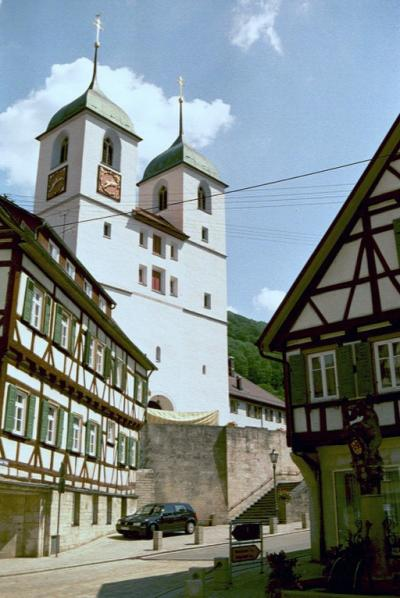
Wiesensteig church

== Natural Monuments ==
- Source of the Fils, about two kilometers southwest of Wiesensteig.

== Sports ==
=== Ski ===
Wiesensteig has with the ski area Bläsiberg the largest ski resort in the Swabian Jura. It includes three tows and about 5 km slopes with different levels of difficulty.

== Other Sports ==
The TSV Obere Fils was founded on June 24, 1972 by the merger of the two clubs TSV Wiesensteig and TSV Mühlhausen.

== Personality ==
=== Sons and daughters of the town ===
- 1704, June 1, Johann Baptist Straub, † July 15, 1784 in Munich, major sculptor of the Upper Bavarian rococo
- 1736, February 6, Franz Xaver Messerschmidt, † August 19, 1783 in Bratislava, sculptor
- 1932, March 15, Erno Seifriz, † April 4, 2012, music pedagogue, music historian and choirmaster
- 1949, December 20, Franz Steinle, lawyer, sports official (president of the German Ski Association)

== Literature ==
- Wiesensteig in alten Bildern. Bearbeitung und Zusammenstellung Franz Naumann. Geiger, Horb am Neckar, 1990, ISBN 3-89264-475-6.
