= Hohenstadt =

German municipality

- Municipality
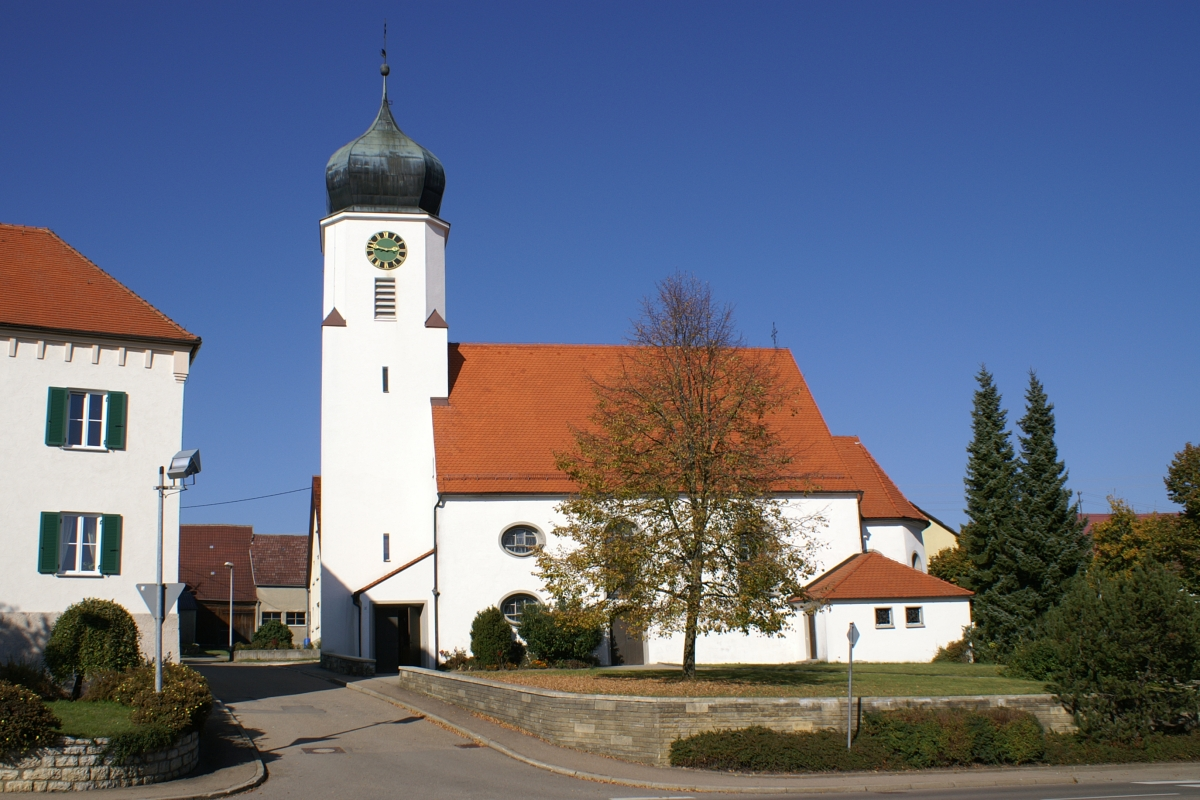
- St. Margaret's Church, Hohenstadt

- Coat of arms

- Location of Hohenstadt within Göppingen district
- Interactive map of Hohenstadt
- Location within Germany Location within Baden-Württemberg
- Coordinates: 48°32′40″N 9°39′48″E
- Country: Germany
- State: Baden-Württemberg
- Admin. region: Stuttgart
- District: Göppingen

Area
  - Total: 11.64 km^{2} (4.49 sq mi)
- Elevation: 814 m (2,671 ft)

Population (2025-12-31)
  - Total: 748
  - Density: 64.3/km^{2} (166/sq mi)
- Time zone: UTC+01:00 (CET)
  - Summer (DST): UTC+02:00 (CEST)
- Postal codes: 73345
- Dialling codes: 07335
- Vehicle registration: GP
- Website: www.hohenstadt-alb.de

Hohenstadt is a municipality in the Göppingen district of Baden-Württemberg, Germany.

== History ==
Hohenstadt was sold in 1483 by the County of Helfenstein to the Lords of Westerstetten, who would in 1485 cede half of the township to the County of Württemberg. The Helfensteins resumed control of the ceded half in 1586, but when they went extinct in 1627, it reverted to the sovereignty of the now Duchy of Württemberg. Hohenstadt only fully came under Württemberg's control when in 1806 the Lordship of Wiesensteig, which controlled the town at that time, was mediatized to Württemberg, now a Kingdom. The town was assigned to Oberamt Göppingen, after 1938 Landkreis Göppingen, its contemporary incarnation. Hohenstadt began a period of urban growth after World War II that ended in the 1960s.

== Geography ==
The municipality (Gemeinde) of Hohenstadt is situated in the district of Göppingen, of the German state of Baden-Württemberg. Hohenstadt lies at the southernmost tip of Göppingen's district, along its border with the Alb-Danube district. The municipal area is physically located in the Middle Kuppenalb. Elevation above sea level in the municipal area ranges from a high of 836 meters (2,743 ft) Normalnull (NN), the highest elevation above sea level in the Administrative Region of Stuttgart, to a low of 728 meters (2,388 ft) NN.

== Politics ==
Hohenstadt has one borough (Ortsteil), Hohenstadt, and one village, Weilerhöhe. There are three abandoned villages in the municipal area: Feuerbach, Heudorf, and Waldstetten. Hohenstadt is a member of the Oberes Filstal municipal association, headquartered in Wiesensteig.

=== Coat of arms ===
Hohenstadt's coat of arms displays a white elephant head behind a white castle wall upon a field of red. The elephant is a reference to the House of Helfenstein, whose arms feature one, while the castle wall is to distinguish Hohenstadt's blazon from those of other municipalities. The coat of arms was created and accepted by the municipal council in 1948. It was approved by the Federal Ministry of the Interior, and a corresponding municipal flag issued, on 19 March 1960.

== Transportation ==
Hohenstadt is connected to Germany's network of roadways by an access road from its local Landesstraßen und Kreisstraßen to the Bundesautobahn 8. Local public transportation is provided by the Filsland Mobilitätsverbundes.
