= Amstetten (Württemberg) station =

Railway station in Amstetten, Germany

Amstetten (Württ)
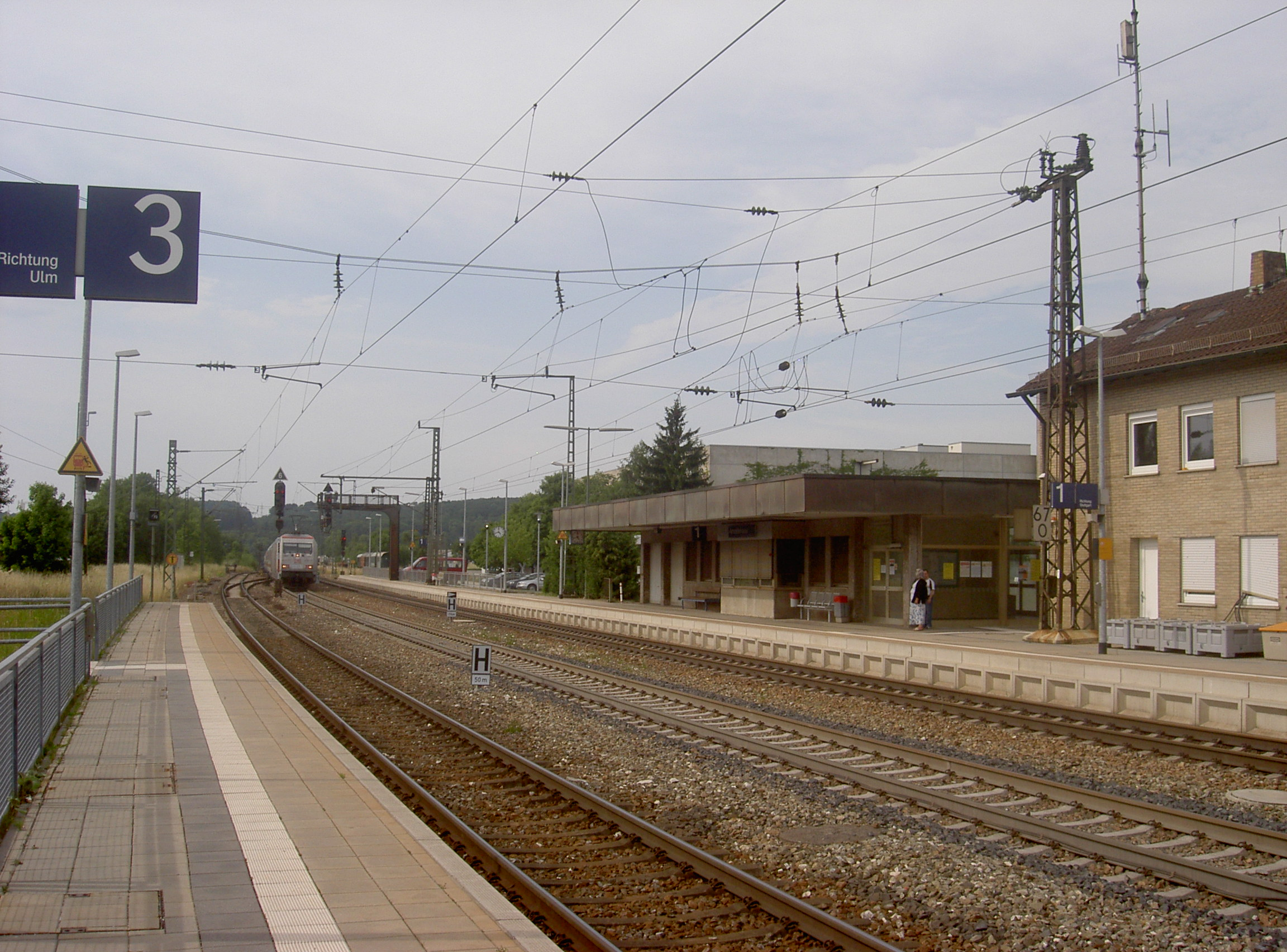
- Amstetten station

General information
- Location: Am Bahnhof 1, Amstetten, Baden-Württemberg; Germany
- Coordinates: 48°34′41″N 9°52′22″E
- System: Through station
- Lines: Fils Valley Railway; Amstetten–Gerstetten Local Railway (museum operations); Amstetten–Laichingen railway (museum operations to Oppingen)
- Platforms: 2

Construction
- Accessible: Yes

Other information
- Station code: 141
- DS100 code: TAM
- IBNR: 8000577
- Category: 5
- Fare zone: DING: 53 and 243
- Website: www.bahnhof.de

History
- Opened: 29 June 1850
Location

Amstetten (Württemberg) station (officially Amstetten (Württ)) is located at line-kilometre 67.0 on the Fils Valley Railway (Filstalbahn) in Amstetten in the German state of Baden-Württemberg. It is at the top of the Geislinger Steige ("Geislingen climb"). The Amstetten–Gerstetten Local Railway (Lokalbahn Amstetten–Gerstetten) and the narrow gauge railway to Oppingen start here. No scheduled passenger services now run on either line. Deutsche Bahn treats the whole station as having three precincts for operational purposes. Amstetten (Württ) Lokalbahnhof ("station of the Local Railway") is operated as a section of the station, while Amstetten (Württ) (Schmalspurbahn) ("narrow gauge railway") is operated as a separate station.

The town that developed around the railway station has over the decades become the largest settlement of the municipality of Amstetten.

== History ==
=== Planning and construction ===
The Württemberg railway Commission Michael Knoll was charged with the planning and implementation of the construction of the railway link between Stuttgart and Ulm. Knoll and his colleague Karl Etzel constructed the Geislinger Steige and foresaw that all trains would have to be assisted by pusher locomotives up this five and a half kilometre-long ramp in order to climb the Swabian Jura (Schwäbische Alb). The railway needed a station as close as possible above the Steige for the uncoupling of the pusher locomotives. Knoll chose a location about one kilometre west of Amstetten. The village at that time was, with some 300 inhabitants, one of the smaller settlements in the Oberamt (district) of Geislingen.

=== State Railways period ===
On 29 June 1850, Royal Württemberg State Railways (Königlich Württembergische Staats-Eisenbahnen) opened the Geislingen–Ulm section. Amstetten station had two crossing tracks and a siding. A two-storey entrance building with arched windows on the ground floor faced the track towards Geislingen. It had a turntable and a shed for storing pusher locomotives.

The station building initially stood by itself in the countryside. Only an inn, which had been opened in 1814, on Staatsstraße (now Hauptstraße 21–23), called Zum Rößle since 1835, and three farmhouses built in 1845 (now Hauptstraße 8; 15-17 and 19) also existed. On maps they were listed as the hamlet of Neuhaus. The State Railway built a residential building for their staff at the station in 1851 and a freight shed with a caretaker apartment in 1860. The Eastern Railway (Ostbahn) was double-tracked between Plochingen and Ulm from 1859 to 1862. An Amstetten farmer founded the Steighof in 1862. A timber merchant from Ulm opened the Bahnhofswirtschaft (now Hauptstraße 96) in 1866.

The State Railway no longer needed the turntable and removed it in 1875. Also in 1875, a timber merchant moved from Hofstett-Emerbuch and established the Zum Rößle inn to a new building (now Hauptstraße 62).

The citizens of Laichingen, Merklingen and Nellingen joined forces to form a railway committee in 1888. They planned a line that would branch from the Eastern Railway at Amstetten, Lonsee, Westerstetten or Beimerstetten. But it soon became clear that, only Laichingen could get a connection with a branch starting at any of the latter three stations.

The State Railways classified the project as unprofitable, so the track was built and operated by the private Württembergische Eisenbahn-Gesellschaft (Württemberg Railway Company, WEG). The metre-gauge railway was opened on 20 October 1901. The WEG built a narrow gauge railway station with a turntable and a Rollbock pit on the western side of Amstetten station.

The residents of Gerstetten also wanted a railway connection. In 1896, they founded a civic association for this purpose. They preferred a connection via Herbrechtingen on the Brenz Railway. But in 1901, the WEG suggested that a railway line should first be built from Amstetten to Gerstetten and then possibly extended to Herbrechtingen. The civic association agreed to this. The first scheduled train ran on 1 July 1906. The continuation to Herbrechtingen was never built.

=== The foundation of the Amstetten-Bahnhof settlement ===
In 1925, the inhabitants of Neuhaus applied that their place of residence should not be considered separately as a hamlet, but instead it should also be considered as part of Amstetten. Meanwhile, only 265 people lived in the village and 264 people already lived around the station. On 9 April 1926, the Ministry of Interior united the hamlet of Neuhaus, the residential area near the station and the hamlet of Steighof as Amstetten-Bahnhof ("Amstetten station").

The completion of the electrification of the Eastern Railway on 1 June 1933 ended the need for the pushing of trains between Geislingen and Amstetten. The movement of heavy freight trains is an exception today.

=== Deutsche Bundesbahn period and closure of branch lines ===
After the Second World War, the local population grew almost exclusively at Amstetten-Bahnhof. In 1961, the Amstetten-Bahnhof had 1,090 inhabitants, while 306 people lived in Amstetten village.

In 1970, Deutsche Bundesbahn demolished the historic station building and replaced it with a simple structure with a flat roof. Passenger traffic on the Albbähnle (Amstetten–Laichingen line) was abandoned by 31 August 1985. After the discontinuation of freight on 14 September 1985, the WEG dismantled much of the line. The last section between Amstetten and Oppingen has been preserved. On 1 March 1996, the scheduled passenger services ended on the Amstetten–Gerstetten line. The Ulm Railway Society (Ulmer Eisenbahnfreunde) bought both lines and used them for the operation of historical trains and railcars.

== Operations ==
The station is served by regional trains. Trains running towards Geislingen (Steige) stop on platform 1 (next to the station building). Track 2 has no platform and is used by trains running through. Trains running towards Ulm stop on platform 3.

Line	Route	Frequency
MEX 16	Stuttgart – S-Bad Cannstatt – Esslingen (Neckar) – Plochingen – Göppingen – Geislingen (Steige) – Ulm	Hourly
RE 5	Stuttgart – S-Bad Cannstatt – Esslingen (Neckar) – Plochingen – Göppingen – Geislingen (Steige) – Ulm – Aulendorf – Friedrichshafen	Some trains

Amstetten (Württ) station is classified by Deutsche Bahn as a category 5 station.

The Lokalbahnhof section of the station is a single-platform station, located east of the station and is connected via a transfer track to the Fils Valley Railway running towards Geislingen. It has one track and used exclusively for the operation of historical trains.

The narrow-gauge station is to the west of the station. It is connected via a transfer track to the Fils Valley Railway towards Ulm, which ends at a switchback. It has several tracks, but only one platform. It is also used exclusively for the operation of historical trains.
