= Ebersbach (Fils) station =

Railway station in Ebersbach an der Fils, Germany

Ebersbach (Fils)
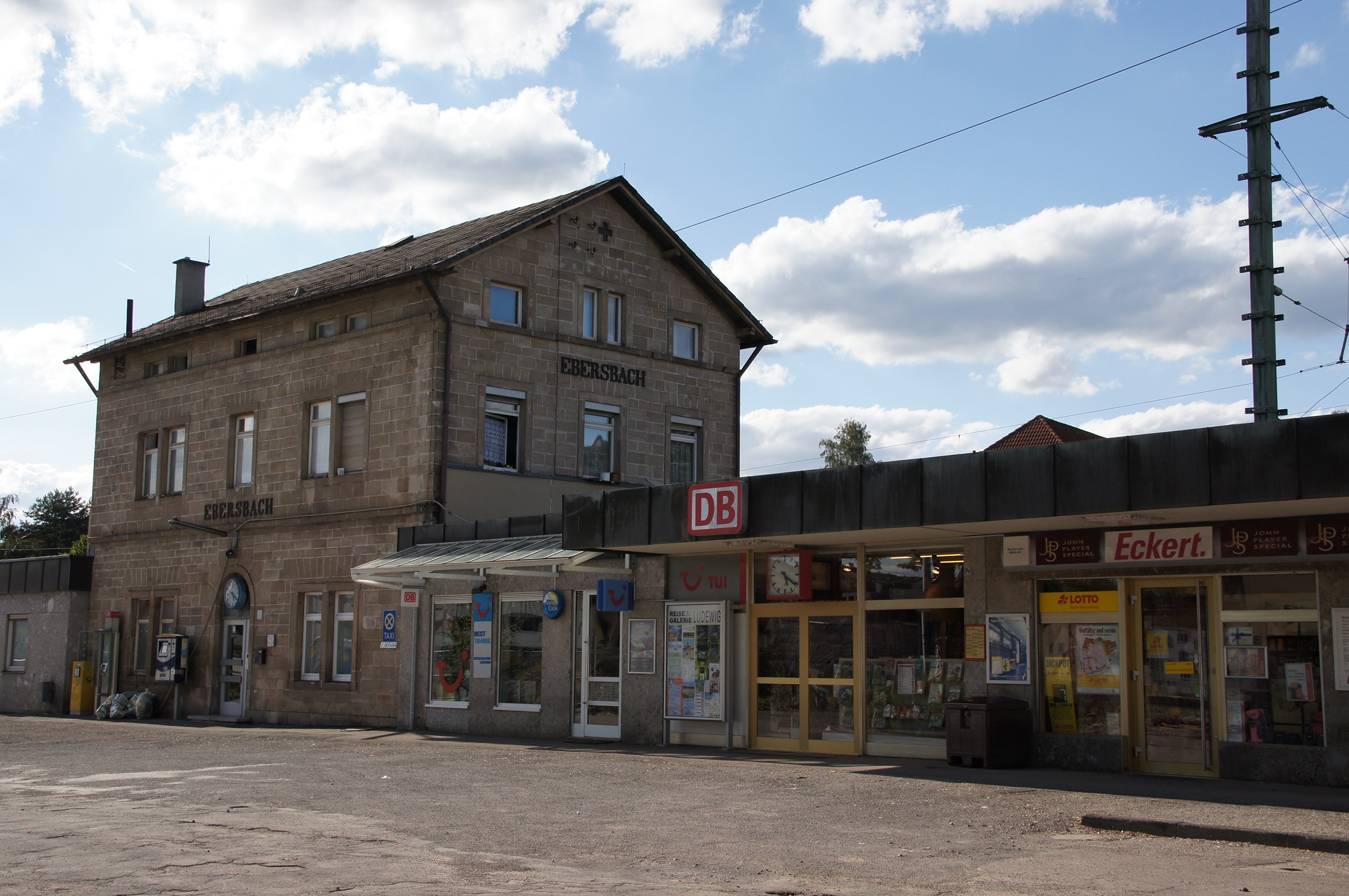

General information
- Location: Bahnhofstr. 19, Ebersbach an der Fils, Baden-Württemberg; Germany
- Coordinates: 48°42′58″N 9°31′37″E
- Owner: Deutsche Bahn
- Operator: DB Netz; DB Station&Service
- Lines: Fils Valley Railway (99.8 km) (KBS 750)
- Platforms: 2

Construction
- Accessible: Yes

Other information
- Station code: n/a
- DS100 code: TEC
- IBNR: 8001632
- Category: 4
- Fare zone: : 4
- Website: www.bahnhof.de

History
- Opened: 11 October 1847

Services
Preceding station		Following station
Reichenbach (Fils) towards Stuttgart Hbf	MEX 16	Uhingen towards Ulm Hbf
Location

Ebersbach (Fils) station is located at the 32 kilometre point of the Fils Valley Railway in the German state of Baden-Württemberg.

== History ==
The citizens of Ebersbach welcomed the news that they would have a station on the Eastern Railway (Ostbahn, now called the Fils Valley Railway) from Stuttgart to Ulm. For geographical reasons the Royal Württemberg State Railways could not build the railway line along the Fils. Instead, it chose an alternative alignment that ran straight through the town. Some buildings had to be demolished for its construction. This unfavourable route cut the town into two parts. While the village was located south of the tracks, the church along with Kirchberg, which was already populated, was north of the line. A level crossing was built on the road to Büchenbronn. The name of the nearby street Steggasse (footbridge street) still refers to the former pedestrian bridge built in 1847.

=== State Railways period ===
On 11 October 1847, the State Railway opened to Plochingen–Süßen section of the Eastern Railway, including Ebersbach station. The municipality agreed to participate in the financing of the station building, which has been preserved. It is a two-storey sandstone building, which initially had only one floor. In May 1853, a small freight shed was built east of the station building. An annex to the station building was completed for the postal service in 1856. Between 1859 and 1862, the State Railway duplicated the Eastern Railway between Plochingen and Ulm. In order to expand the freight yard, it acquired more land and created an enlarged freight shed in 1862. The station building also had to be increased again in 1865. The wooden pedestrian bridge was replaced by an iron bridge in 1866.

The then Mayor Geyer and the local council vehemently opposed the establishment of factories. Finally in 1862, a textile entrepreneur founded the Scheuffelen textile factory. It remained the only factory until 1887.

Since 1893, Ebersbach station has had a passing loop to allow trains to pass. The post office, which had was connected to the telegraph in 1866, gained a telephone connection on 17 December 1899. In 1909 it moved into a new building on Bahnhofstrasse, which was demolished in 2010.

=== Deutsche Reichsbahn and the Deutsche Bundesbahn period ===
On 1 June 1933, Deutsche Reichsbahn electrified the Stuttgart–Ulm line. The iron pedestrian bridge had to be demolished so that the overhead wires could be erected.

After the Second World War, electric trains mainly operated through the station and between Plochingen and Geislingen. Since 15 June 1967 there has been a covered island platform between tracks 2 and 3.

In the 1970s, Deutsche Bundesbahn made comprehensive changes to the station. Modern rooms were created for passengers and staff. To this end, it established a new single-storey extension on the eastern side. The project was completed on 15 May 1975. The new building with a flat roof contained, in addition to new offices and the ticket office, a restaurant and a kiosk. The old station building was extensively renovated from 1974 to 1975.

Despite protests, Deutsche Bundesbahn demolished the freight yard to create a parking area on 20 May 1976. Since then it has no longer possible been possible to send small consignments from Ebersbach.

== Rail operations ==
Ebersbach station is served by regional services. Platform track 1 (next to the station building) is used by services towards Göppingen. Track 2 is also used by services towards Göppingen. Track 3 is used by services towards Plochingen. Track 4 has no platform and is used exclusively by non-stopping services to Plochingen.

The station is classified by Deutsche Bahn as a category 4 station.

Route		Frequency
MEX 16	Stuttgart – S-Bad Cannstatt – Esslingen (Neckar) – Plochingen – Ebersbach – Göppingen – Geislingen (Steige) – Ulm	Every 30 mins to Geislingen, hourly to Ulm
RE 5	Stuttgart – S-Bad Cannstatt – Esslingen (Neckar) – Plochingen – Ebersbach – Göppingen – Geislingen (Steige) – Laupheim West – Biberach (Riß) – Aulendorf – Ravensburg – Friedrichshafen Stadt (– Lindau-Reutin)	Two trains in the morning towards Stuttgart
