= Eislingen (Fils) station =

Railway station in Eislingen/Fils, Germany

Eislingen (Fils)
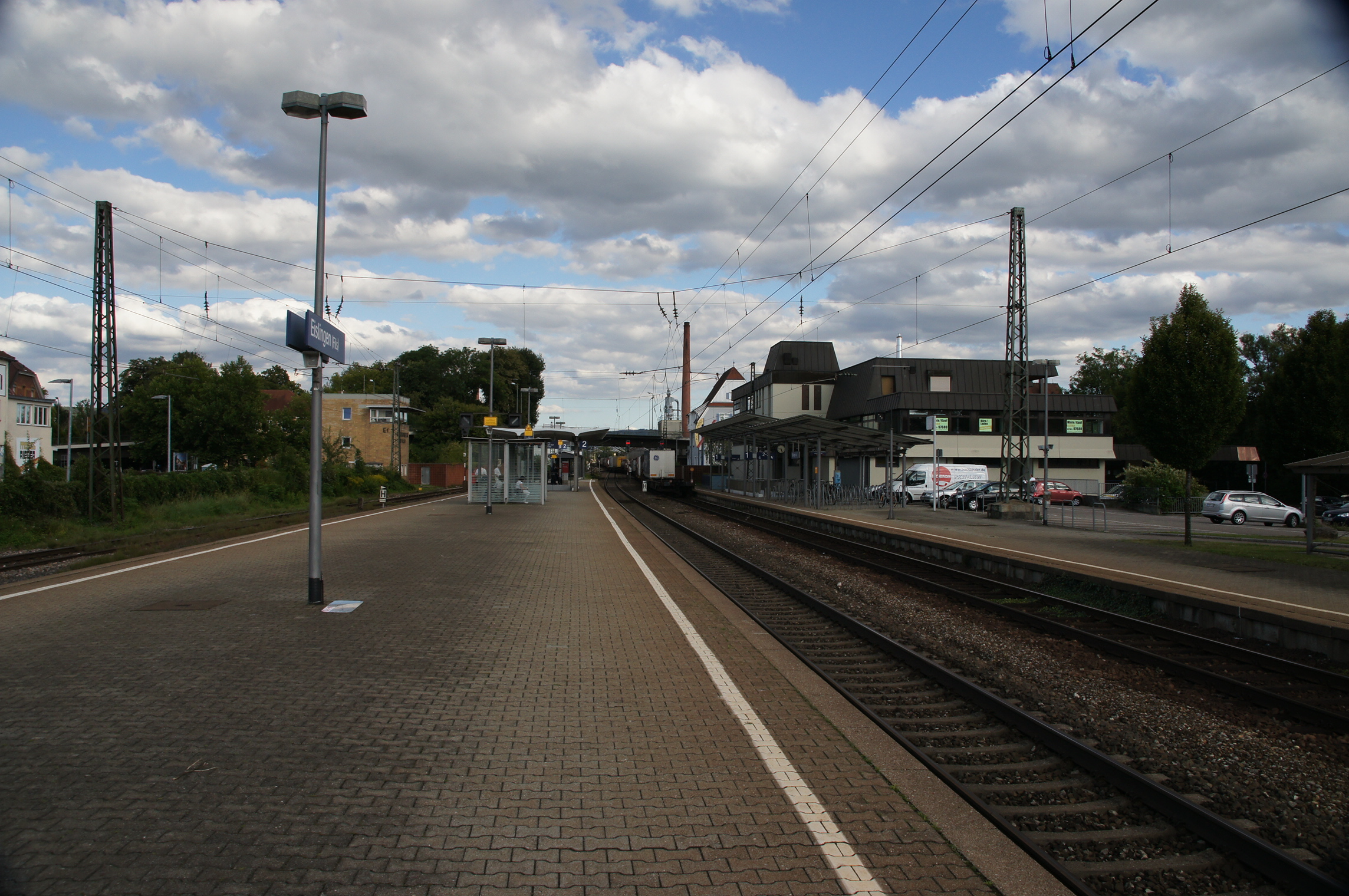
- Eislingen station

General information
- Location: Bahnhofstr. 15, Eislingen, Baden-Württemberg; Germany
- Coordinates: 48°41′48″N 9°42′15″E
- Line: Fils Valley Railway
- Platforms: 3 (2 regularly used)

Construction
- Accessible: Yes

Other information
- Station code: 1539
- DS100 code: TEF
- IBNR: 8000925
- Category: 4
- Fare zone: : 6
- Website: www.bahnhof.de

History
- Opened: 11 October 1847
Location

Eislingen (Fils) station is located at line-kilometre 46.1 on the Fils Valley Railway (Filstalbahn) in Eislingen in the German state of Baden-Württemberg.

== History ==
The Royal Württemberg State Railways built the Eastern Railway (Ostbahn) to connect Stuttgart with Ulm. A station was built in the Großeislingen ("Great Eislingen") district, approximately 400 metres south of the village. This was named Eislingen (on old timetables Eißlingen) since the State Railways did not want to discriminate against Kleineislingen ("Little Eislingen"), which was located nearby on the main Stuttgart—Ulm road and had 1000 inhabitants.

The State Railways opened the Plochingen–Süßen section on 11 October 1847. Eislingen station had a two-story station building, which accommodated a ticket office, a waiting room and a luggage room. Upstairs there was an apartment. East of the station building, at the level crossing over the road between Großeislingen and Kleineislingen, there was a two-storey gatekeeper's house.

=== Expansion and industrialisation in Großeislingen ===
A freight shed with a small apartment for a flagman was located to the west of the station building from 1853. On 10 March 1859, the post office was installed in a room in the entrance building. Between 1859 and 1862, the State Railway doubled the Eastern Railway between Plochingen and Ulm.

The paper mill of the J. C. Schwarz & Söhne company, which was built from 1837 to 1839, was expanded in 1861 and another mill was built on the mill canal. In 1882, the Geiger brothers, who were mechanics, built the Gebrüder Geiger, Fabrik für landwirtschaftliche Maschinen farm machinery factory. In 1900, the Zeller und Gmelin company acquired a site at the station, on which it built a refinery for plant oil and lubricating oil.

In 1898, the station building received a two-storey extension to accommodate a waiting room (eastern extension), and rooms for the train dispatcher, the administration, record storage and the cashier (western extension). Also the goods shed underwent remodeling, including enlargement, in 1904. The first platform underpass was opened in 1906. The post left the entrance building and moved into a new building on Hauptstraße ("main street") in 1909. The State Railway enlarged the previously two-platform station with two additional platform tracks in 1913. It also extended the underpass.

=== The Deutsche Reichsbahn and Deutsche Bundesbahn period ===
Deutsche Reichsbahn completed the electrification of the Eastern Railway on 1 June 1933.

A new 4.5 metre-wide underpass was completed on 8 July 1938. A road bridge was also considered in 1939 but was rejected for the time being. Finally in the late 1960s, Deutsche Bundesbahn was able to close the level crossing on Hauptstraße and demolish the gatekeeper's apartments, when the town council formally inaugurated the overpass on 19 December 1967.

After the entrance building was taken over by the town in 1980, it was torn down on 8 May 1982 so that a new service centre could be built on the site.

== Operations ==
The station is served by Regionalbahn trains. Trains no longer stop at platform 1 (next to the station building) and the track is used for non-stopping trains running towards Ulm. Trains running towards Ulm stop at platform track 2 (on the island platform) and trains running towards Stuttgart stop at platform track 3. Track 4 has no platform and is used exclusively as a siding for overtaking slower trains.

Route		Frequency
MEX 16	Stuttgart – S-Bad Cannstatt – Esslingen – Plochingen – Göppingen – Geislingen (– Ulm)	30 mins

Eislingen (Fils) station is classified by Deutsche Bahn as a category 4 station.
