= Geislinger Steige =

Coordinates: 48.5969°N 9.8511°E

The Geislinger Steige (German pronunciation: [ˈɡaɪslɪŋɐ ˈʃtaɪɡə], "Geislingen climb") is an old trade route over the low mountain range of the Swabian Jura in southern Germany. It links Geislingen an der Steige with Amstetten and is one of the most famous ascents in the Jura. The name "Geislinger Steige" refers both to:

- The long-distance road between Geislingen an der Steige and Amstetten that has existed since Roman times and, today, is part of the B 10 road.
- The railway ramp forming part of the Filstalbahn, a section of the main line between Munich and Stuttgart

The ramp is 5.6 km (3.5 mi) long and climbs a height of 112 m (367 ft). It has an incline of 1:44.5, which is 22.5‰ or 2.25%. The curve radius in places is less than 300 m (980 ft), with a minimum of 278 m (912 ft). This section of the line is therefore built in accordance with the standards for mountain railways.

== Planning and construction ==
With the passing of the law affecting the construction of railways in 1843, the decision was effectively made to build a line from Heilbronn – at that time the final destination for shipping on the river Neckar - to Friedrichshafen on Lake Constance, the first railway line in Württemberg. The biggest difficulty to the construction was the unfavourable topography, because the Swabian Jura had to be crossed between Geislingen and Ulm. After various options had been investigated and discarded, it was finally decided to build a short, steep ramp at Geislingen: the Geislinger Steige.

The construction of the railway ramp was entrusted to senior engineer (Oberingenieur) Michael Knoll and master builder (Oberbaurat) Karl von Etzel, who had gained experience on the Brennerbahn through (South) Tyrol. Construction began in 1847 and the ramp was opened in 1850, around 3,000 workers having been employed. Closely linked to the building of the ramp is the firm of WMF (Württemberg Metal Factory) at Geislingen an der Steige.

== Operations ==
Its operation was a challenge for the Royal Württemberg State Railways (K.W.St.E.) as well as the Deutsche Reichsbahn and Deutsche Bundesbahn. In the steam locomotive age every train, even the Orient-Express, had to be assisted. As a result, the railway stations at Geislingen (Steige) and Amstetten are correspondingly large.

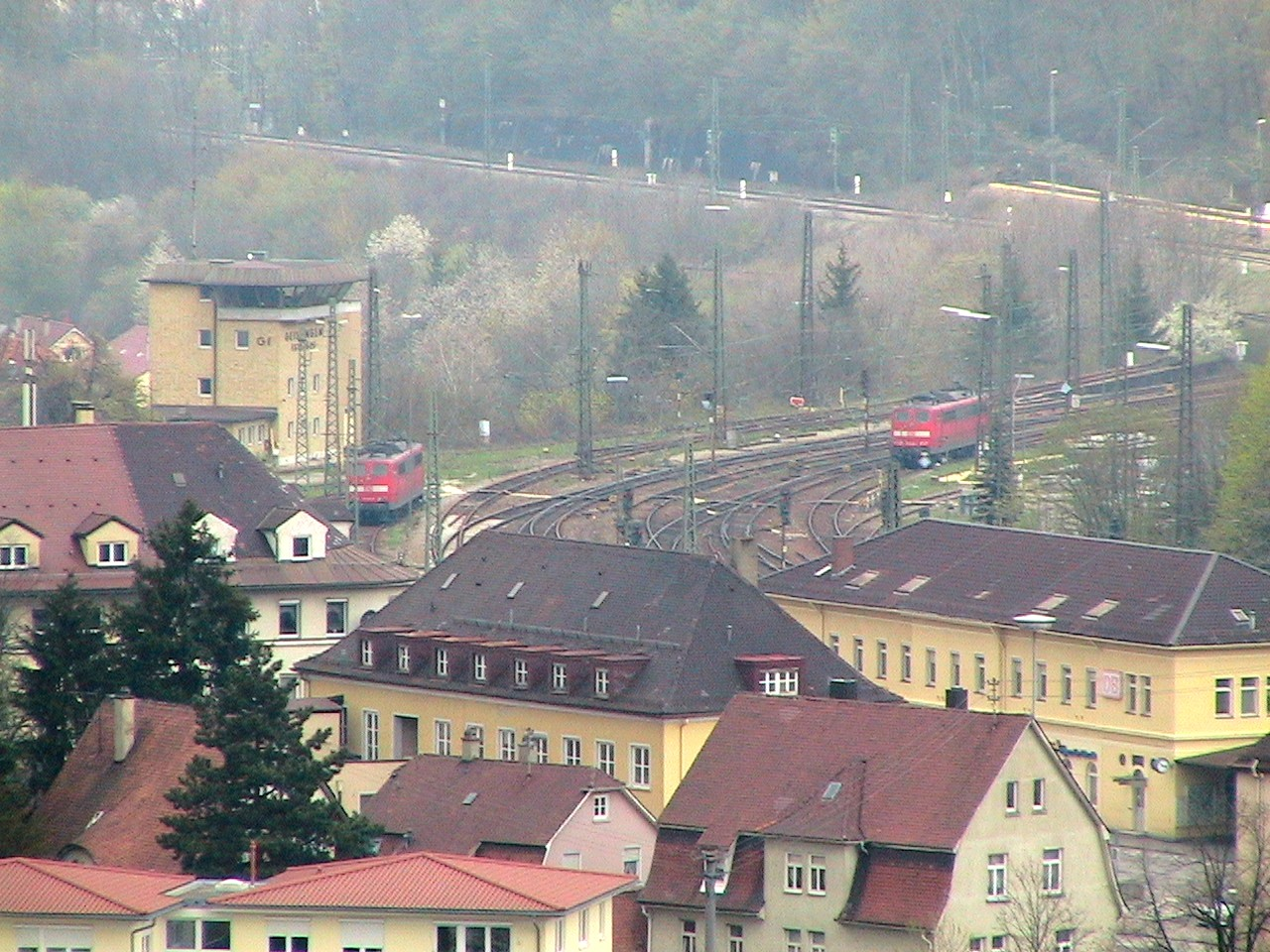
Banking engines in front of Geislingen (Steige) station

For the banking locomotives on stand-by duty there was a depot (Bahnbetriebswerk) with the necessary facilities.

In 1933 the line was electrified by the Deutsche Reichsbahn-Gesellschaft. Electric locomotives were considerably more powerful than steam locomotives. That meant banking duties were reduced. For the remaining work locomotives of DRG Class E 93 (later 193) and DRB Class E 94 (194) were employed. Amongst others, they relieved the steam locomotives of DRG Class 59.

In the Deutsche Bundesbahn era the trains were mainly hauled by standard electrics, the so-called Einheits-Elektrolokomotiven, and also the DB Class 103.

In February 1975 the so-called Gleiswechselbetrieb between Geislingen (Steige) and Amstetten was introduced. This means that both tracks can be used in either direction and enables, for example, slower trains to change tracks to allow faster trains to overtake. In March 1986 this was also brought in between Geislingen West and Geislingen (Steige). In 1987 Class 140s (temporarily) and 150s replaced the Class 194s as pusher locomotives. The Class 150s have since been retired. Since 1991 banking duties have largely been done away with on passenger trains as a result of the introduction of the ICEs and more powerful locomotives (e.g. DBAG Class 101, DB Class 120). As before the InterRegioExpress (IRE) runs every two hours, which during the week is run four times a day with a Sprinter with two Class 218 diesel locomotives; the rest of the time with Class 146.2, from Lindau to Stuttgart and back. By hooking the banking engines up front and back, the least time is lost for passengers on the Geislinger Steige. As before, however, heavy goods trains are pushed. For Railion trains (formerly DB Cargo) there are two DB Class 151 engines at Geislingen. Since increasingly private railway companies in Germany are transporting freight, private banking engines may also be encountered on the Geislinger Steige (e.g. Class 66 of the Häfen und Güterverkehr Köln (HGK).

== Future ==
The top speed on the ramp at Geislinger Steige is 70 km/h (45 mph). Trains with uncoupled banking engines climb the ramp at 60 km/h (35 mph).

To make matters even more inconvenient, the track practically encircles the town in an almost perfect horseshoe shape. Thus it runs round almost two thirds of Geislingen's location within the valley, significantly enlongating the track.

In order to get rid of that bottleneck a new high-speed line is being planned: the Wendlingen–Ulm high-speed railway, for speeds up to 250 km/h (160 mph). It is intended to get round the height difference at Geislingen using two tunnels, each 8 km (5 mi) long. The still-outstanding financial risk cover was sorted out in July 2007. On the down side, plans for other sections of the new line have still not been finalised.

Due to the steepness of the new line heavy trains will not be permitted to use it. As a result, pusher services on the Geislinger Steige, which have been going for 150 years, will continue to be needed.

== Sources ==
- Karlheinz Bauer et al., Die Geislinger Steige – ein schwäbisches Jahrhundertbauwerk, Stadtarchiv Geislingen an der Steige, Geislingen an der Steige, 2000, ISBN

== See also ==
- Royal Württemberg State Railways
- Other famous south-German ramps: the Schiefe Ebene and the Spessart Ramp

== Video ==
- Rund um die Geislinger Steige (105 min, alphaCam, Blaustein, 1988)
- 150 Jahre Geislinger Steige – Teil 1 (57 min, alphaCam, Blaustein, 2000) Ramp construction history, present-day railway operations
- 150 Jahre Geislinger Steige – Teil 2 (56 min, alphaCam, Blaustein, 2000) Nostalgia up to 25 years ago (E194/steam engines, etc.)
- 150 Jahre Geislinger Steige – Teil 3 (56 min, alphaCam, Blaustein, 2000) The 2000 celebrations with ceremony and special trips
