= Geislingen an der Steige =

- Town
- Coat of arms

- Location of Geislingen an der Steige within Göppingen district
- Interactive map of Geislingen an der Steige
- Location within Germany Location within Baden-Württemberg
- Coordinates: 48°37′28″N 9°49′50″E
- Country: Germany
- State: Baden-Württemberg
- Admin. region: Stuttgart
- District: Göppingen

Government
  - Mayor (2022–30): Frank Dehmer (Ind.)

Area
  - Total: 75.83 km^{2} (29.28 sq mi)
- Elevation: 464 m (1,522 ft)

Population (2025-12-31)
  - Total: 27,781
  - Density: 366.4/km^{2} (948.9/sq mi)
- Time zone: UTC+01:00 (CET)
  - Summer (DST): UTC+02:00 (CEST)
- Postal codes: 73301–73312
- Dialling codes: 07331, 07334, 07337
- Vehicle registration: GP
- Website: www.geislingen.de

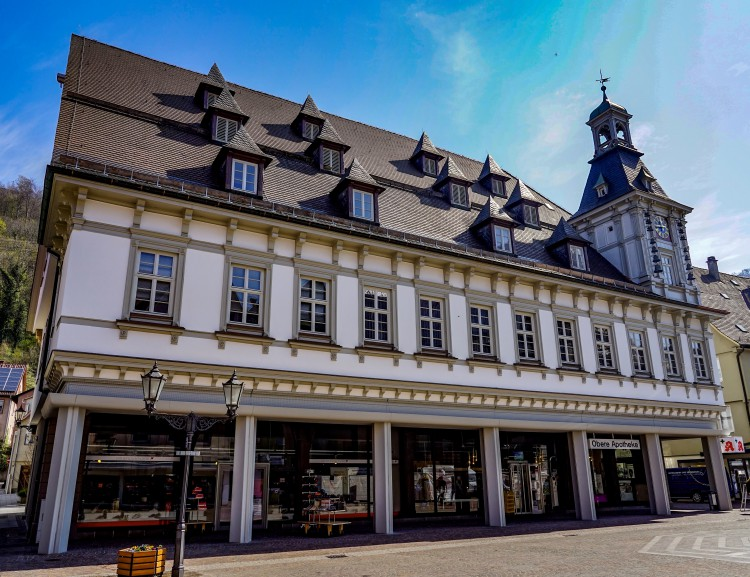

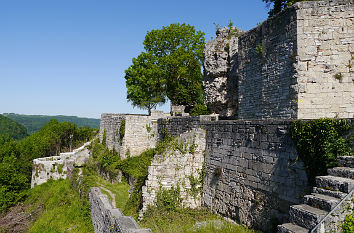

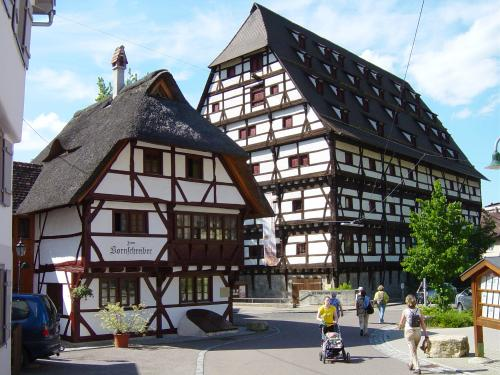

Geislingen an der Steige (German pronunciation: [ˈɡaɪ̯slɪŋən ʔan deːɐ̯ ˈʃtaɪ̯ɡə], lit. 'Geislingen on the Climb') is surrounded by the heights of the Swabian Alb and embedded in 5 valleys. It is a town in the district of Göppingen in Baden-Württemberg in southern Germany. The name relates to its location "on the climb" (an der Steige) of a trade route over the Swabian Jura mountain range. It is in the southeast of the Stuttgart region about 50 km from Stuttgart and 27 km from Ulm. It is the second largest city in the district of Göppingen. The city is characterized by a grown industry and attractive surroundings of the Swabian Albtrauf adventure region - this creates a positive environment for regionally and internationally oriented companies. Geislingen's economic significance lies above all in the steel and metal goods processing and automotive supply sectors.

Geislingen is also a city of students. The University of Applied Sciences for Economy and Environment is known far beyond the borders, with best rankings. A medieval town with Alemannic half-timbered houses testifies to a long history, which can also be seen during a walk through the town.

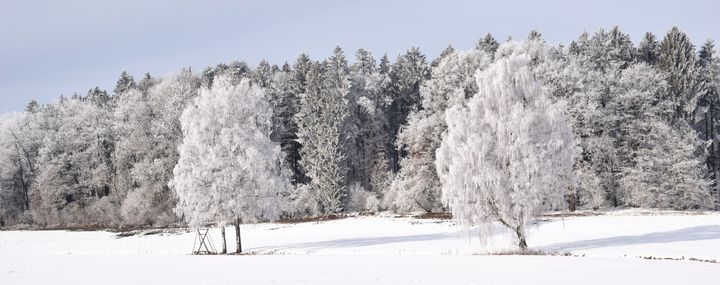

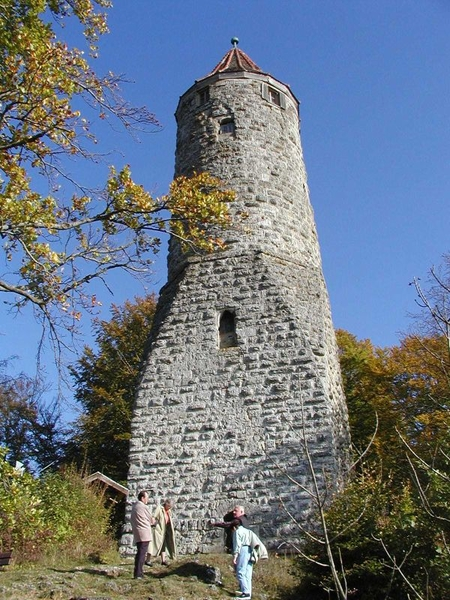

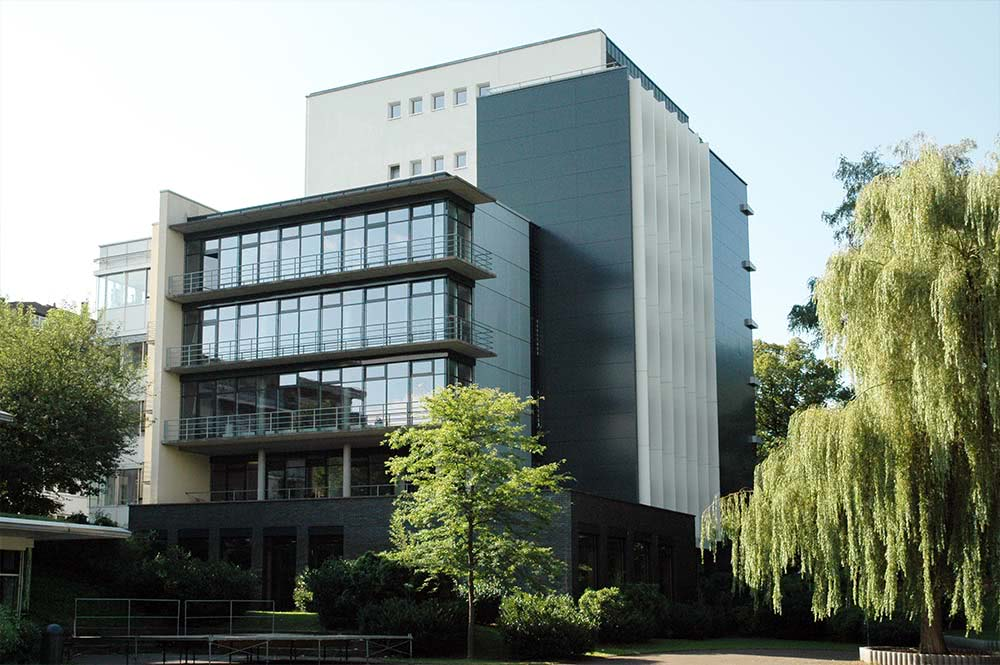

== Coat of arms ==
The coat of arms of Geislingen shows a shield divided per pale sable and argent (black and silver), overlaid with a five-petaled, golden, red rose with green sepals. The town flag is black and white.

In 1367, Count Ulrich von Helfenstein stipulated in a city ordinance that the city seal should have his full coat of arms. This seal remained for some time even after the sale of Geislingen in 1396 to the imperial city of Ulm. The divided shield of the city of Ulm can be identified in the seal (from 1422) for the first time. Whether the rose was already present in the poorly-preserved seal impression cannot be said with certainty. The city colors black and white were mentioned for the first time in a hunters' book in 1557.

== Main sights ==
- Ostlandkreuz: A monument to displaced persons from the east. (See "Geislingen and Estonia" below.)
- Ruins of Helfenstein Castle
- Hiking and biking in the Albtrau.
- Sea of flags in the pedestrian zone during the summer months
- Indian Summer in the Fünftälerstadt: In late summer, Geislingen is completely surrounded by the orange-red leaf coloration of the surrounding forests.
- Old building - museum and gallery. Imposing half-timbered building with eight floors. The mixture of Geislingen's town history and regional art, presented in changing exhibitions, make the Alter Bau a lively cultural venue in the historic old town. While strolling through the city center, it is worth taking a look at the Geislinger Stadtkirche, which was built in only four years by the Ulmer Münsterbauhütte. The "little Ulm minster" in Gothic style is freely accessible during the day and offers space to pause. In the choir room, the side altar with a double-sided wing can be admired.
- The Ödenturm, which is over 600 years old, opens its doors on Sundays and holidays from May to October. Climbing the 300 steps is rewarded with a window view. After-work atmosphere in the city park.
- The Stadtpark with beer garden

== Education ==
Geislingen an der Steige has four grammar schools, the Helfenstein-Gymnasium, the Michelberg-Gymnasium as well as a Wirtschaftsgymnasium and a Sozialwissenschaftliches Gymnasium (school authority is the district of Göppingen), two Realschulen, the Daniel-Straub-Realschule and the Schubart-Realschule, two special schools (Pestalozzischule, Bodelschwingh-Schule), one Waldorf school, three elementary and secondary schools with Werkrealschule (Lindenschule, Tegelbergschule and Uhlandschule) and three independent elementary schools (Albert-Einstein-Schule, Grundschule Aufhausen and Grundschule Eybach). The Michelberg Gymnasium underwent ecological renovation in 2016, during which mistakes were made that led to the closure of a section of the building in early 2020 due to the risk of collapse. Furthermore, serious violations of fire safety regulations were discovered. Redevelopment of the renovation or demolition and new construction would lead the city of Geislingen into over-indebtedness.

Geislingen is the location of the Faculty of Business and Law of the Nürtingen-Geislingen University of Applied Sciences (HfWU) with Bachelor's degree programs in Automotive Management, Energy and Resource Management, Health and Tourism Management, Real Estate Management, Business Law, and Sustainable Product Management. In addition, the master's programs Automotive Management, Real Estate Management, Corporate Management, and Corporate Restructuring and Insolvency Management are offered at the location. Students in Geislingen are allowed to share the use of WMF's company cafeteria, as Geislingen itself does not have its own cafeteria.

The district of Göppingen is the school authority for the three vocational schools (Emil-von-Behring-Schule - Hauswirtschaftliche Schule, Gewerbliche Schule und Kaufmännische Schule founded by Reinhard Nickl) and the Bodelschwinghschule für Geistigbehinderte.

== History ==
Although the area had settlements since the Bronze Age, Geislingen was founded by the counts of Helfenstein as a transit collection station on the important commercial route between the Rhine valley and the Mediterranean. The fortified Helfenstein castle existed since 1100. Giselingen was first mentioned as civitas in a document dated 1237. From 1396 through 1802, Geislingen was owned by the free and imperial city of Ulm on the Danube. In 1803 Ulm and Geislingen became part of Bavaria, but in a land exchange were incorporated into the Kingdom of Württemberg in 1810. Much older than the "artificial" foundation of Geislingen are two present-day districts, Altenstadt and Rorgensteig. Altenstadt, in the oldest times still called "ze der alten Stadt" or "Altengiselingen", is of Alamannic origin. First traces of settlement go back to the 5th century.

On the site of today's "Lindenhof" stood since the 11th century a St. Michael's church, the original church of Altenstadt and the whole surrounding area. So the name of the later helfenstein Geislingen comes from the older neighboring village. Rorgensteig, situated on the upper Rohrach River, was an old parish village into which the citizens of the town of Geislingen were parishioners until 1393.

The importance of the Rorgensteig church for the religious life of the Geislingen community decreased since the elevation of the Geislingen Lady Chapel to a parish church (around 1393) and the construction of the present town church in the years 1424 to 1428. Rorgensteig with its mills had special significance as the first medieval "industrial center" of the town.

== Industrialization ==
Industrialization started with the arrival of the railroad and the construction of the Fils Valley Railway (1847–1850) up the Geislinger Steige, a steep incline of rail and road to the plateau of the Schwäbische Alb (Swabian Jura), and Geislingen (Steige) station. The leading industrial enterprise is the Württembergische Metallwarenfabrik (WMF) founded in 1852, a world-renowned manufacturer of goods for kitchen and table.

Much older than the "artificial" foundation of Geislingen are two present-day districts, Altenstadt and Rorgensteig. Altenstadt, in the oldest times still called "ze der alten Stadt" or "Altengiselingen", is of Alamannic origin. First traces of settlement go back to the 5th century.

== Geislingen and Estonia ==
The great wave of escape in 1944 brought thousands of Estonians to Germany. After the Second World War, 4400 Estonian refugees lived in the Geislingen refugee camp (including Voldemar Päts, Rev. Karl Raudsepp,Roman Toi, Priit Vesilind, Olev Piirsalu, Elias Kasak, Verner Hans Puurand, Henrik Visnapuu, Pedro Krusten, Peeter Puusep, Harald Raudsepp and others). The Geislingen Estonian Gymnasium, Geislingen Estonian Primary School, Geislingen Estonian Theater and the Geislingen Estonian Symphony Orchestra operated there. The newspaper Eesti Post was published in Geislingen in 1945–1953. A memorial at the Geislingen cemetery was erected in 1949, designed by architects Kolmar and Aren, reflecting the fate of Estonians in exile. The names of 102 Estonians who died in Geislingen were carved in stone, with later additions to the list tallying a total of 154 names. The Geislingen refugee camp existed from October 1945 to June 24, 1950.

== Train connection ==
In 1850, the construction of the Geislinger Steige was a pioneering act of the first order. The town experienced a noticeable upswing due to the connection to the "big wide world", which can be seen in new jobs and a growing population.

In the year 2000 – 150 years later - the Deutsche Bahn AG, the municipality of Amstetten and the town of Geislingen an der Steige celebrated this "groundbreaking" anniversary with various activities, projects and events.

Information about the model "Geislinger Steige 1925".

Scale: 1:250 (railroad models size Z - 1 : 220).

Prototype: Railroad line between 60.650 km (Geislingen gas works) and 67.850 km (bridge L 1232 in Amstetten) over a length of 7.2 km.

Dimensions: In nature 6.3 km x max. 350 m In model 25.80 m x max. 1.40 m(over turning boxes 28.35 m)

Buildings: As exact a replica as possible of the building stock in 1925 based on plans by DB and the Geislingen and Amstetten building administration offices. Railroad buildings exactly replicated, other buildings stylized (true to form and color, but without windows and doors).

Construction time: April 1998 - June 2000

Modelers: Doris Benney, Jochen Böhm, Thorsten Böhm, Joachim Frauenstein, Jan Frese, Georg Katsoulis, Martin Moser, Reiner Schöll, Gerhard Stabel, Herbert Strauß, Alfred Wäse, Friedrich Welle, Georg Welle

The model can be seen in the Museum im Alten Bau.linger Marienkapelle to the parish church (around 1393) and the construction of the present town church in the years 1424 to 1428. The Rorgensteig with its mills was of particular importance as the first medieval "industrial center" of the town.

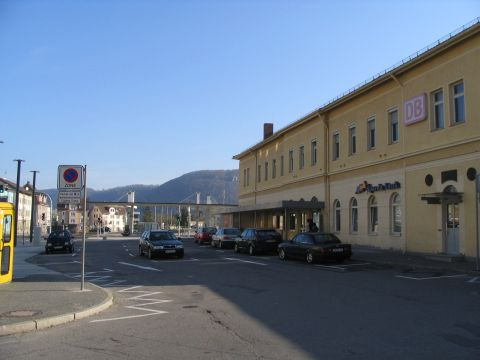

== Local traffic ==
Since January 1, 2014, the district of Göppingen has been part of the VVS. This partial integration is an important step for the district communities into the public transport system of the region. On the other hand, passengers from the previous VVS area also benefit from the expanded travel options. For further information, please refer to the Verkehrs- und Tarifverbund Stuttgart.

Filsland is the mobility association in the district of Göppingen, the union of all bus companies in the district and the Deutsche Bahn. With the Filsland ticket, you only need one ticket to be mobile by bus and train.

In addition, the Geislingen area is included in the DING network (Donau-Iller-Nahverkehrsgesellschaft). Anyone traveling by bus or train from Geislingen to the Alb-Donau district can now take advantage of all the price benefits of the DING transport association there.

Long-distance connections

Detailed, personalized timetable information can be obtained from the electronic timetable information system Baden-Württemberg.

You can access the timetable information of the German railroad under the following link reiseauskunft.bahn.de.

== Notable people ==
=== Sons and daughters of the city ===
- Karl Allgöwer (born 1957), football player
- Andreas Buck (born 1967) football player
- Andreas Frey (born 1967), economist and rector
- Markus Gisdol (born 1969), football player and coach
- Bernhard Ilg (born 1956), politician (CDU) and Lord mayor of Heidenheim since 2000
- Michael Knoll (1805–1852), railway engineer, Oberbaurat, builder of the Geislinger Steige
- de:Johannes Nisle (1735–1788), Horn player and composer
- Martina Schumacher (born 1972), painter and conceptual artist
- Kai Wagner (born 1997), football player

== Partnership ==
Geislingen is twin town of:

- Bischofswerda, Saxony
- Montceau-les-Mines, France
- Geislingen has been twinned with Bischofswerda in Saxony since 1990 and with Montceau-les-Mines in France since 1993. Since 1971 there has been a school exchange between the two towns, which is considered the basis for the town twinning.

== City structure ==
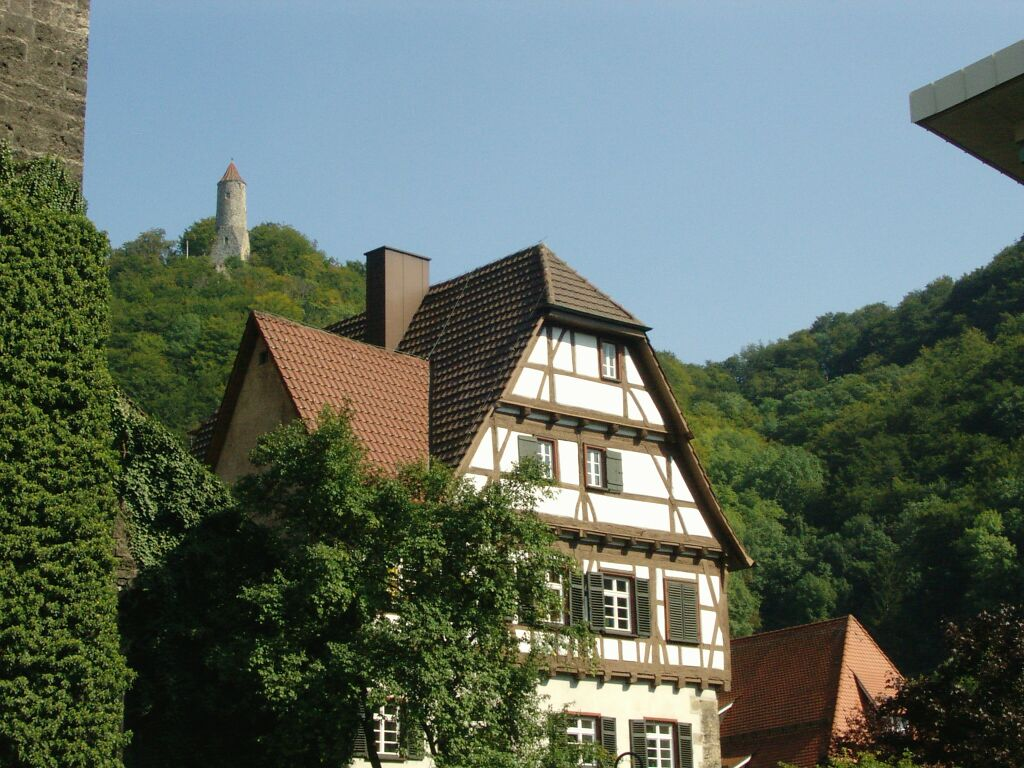

Geislingen's urban area consists of the core city, which also includes the community of Altenstadt (historically the city's predecessor settlement), which was incorporated in 1912 and has since grown completely into the city center, and the communities of Aufhausen, Eybach, Stötten, Türkheim, Waldhausen and Weiler ob Helfenstein, which were incorporated as part of the territorial reform of the 1970s and are now referred to as municipal districts. Each of these boroughs is also a locality within the meaning of the Baden-Württemberg Municipal Code, i.e. they have a local council whose members are elected by those entitled to vote in the locality at each local election. The chairman of the local council is the head of the village. The number of local councillors ranges from seven to eleven, depending on the size of the locality.

Some parts of the town include further partly spatially separated residential districts or residential places with their own names. The Wannenhöfe belong to Aufhausen, Christofshof, Oßmannsweiler and Untere Roggenmühle with the Burgstall of Roggenstein Castle to Eybach, Wittingen to Türkheim and Battenau, Hofstett am Steig and Lindenhof to Weiler ob Helfenstein. In the core town, in addition to Altenstadt, further residential areas with their own names are distinguished, whose designations have arisen in the course of development, but whose boundaries are usually not fixed.

== Traffic ==
The town lies on the B 10 (Lebach-Augsburg) and B 466 (to Mühlhausen im Täle) federal highways.

Geislingen is located on the Filstalbahn from Stuttgart to Ulm, which was opened in 1847. Geislingen (Steige) station is served hourly by regional train and regional express trains to Stuttgart, Plochingen and Ulm. In addition to the Geislingen station, which is called the main station in bus transport, there is also the Geislingen West station. From 1903 to 1981, Geislingen was the starting point of the Tälesbahn, a branch line to Wiesensteig. The Königlich Württembergische Staats-Eisenbahnen built the station building in Geislingen-Altenstadt for this purpose as a unit station of type. The section to Geislingen-Altenstadt remained in operation until 2002.

In the urban area, mainly numerous bus lines of the Filsland mobility association provide local public transport (ÖPNV). Geislingen has a central bus station (ZOB), right next to the main train station.
