= Amstetten =

Amstetten may refer to:

- Amstetten (Württemberg), a municipality in the Alb-Donau district of Germany
- Amstetten, Lower Austria, a municipality in southwest Lower Austria
- Amstetten District, the district in Austria in which the prior municipality is located
