= Süßen station =

Railway station in Süßen, Germany

Süßen

General information
- Location: Bahnhofstr. 10, Süßen, Baden-Württemberg; Germany
- Coordinates: 48°41′0″N 9°45′36″E
- Lines: Fils Valley Railway (99.8 km) (KBS 750)
- Platforms: 4

Construction
- Accessible: Yes

Other information
- Station code: 6127
- DS100 code: TSD
- IBNR: 8005790
- Category: 4
- Fare zone: : 6 and 7
- Website: www.bahnhof.de

History
- Opened: 11 October 1847
Location

Süßen station is located at the 50.4 kilometre point of the Fils Valley Railway in the German state of Baden-Württemberg. From 1901 until its complete closure in 1995 the Lauter Valley Railway branched from Süßen to Weißenstein, a district of Lauterstein.

The station is classified by Deutsche Bahn as a category 4 station. The station is located in the north of the town of Süßen. The bus station is just to the west of the station.

== History ==
The station was opened by the Royal Württemberg State Railways on 11 October 1847 along with the Fils Valley Railway from Plochingen to Süßen.

On 21 April 2004, an inspection train running from Ulm to Ludwigshafen collided with a train of empty regional railcars. The driver of the railcars was killed and the six members of the inspection train were injured.

From August 2010 to June 2012, the station was renovated and made accessible for the disabled with the provision of two lifts and a control system. The underpass was redesigned and new lighting and a dynamic passenger information system were installed. The total cost was €2.6 million, paid for by the federal, state and municipal governments.

== Rail operations ==
Süßen station has seven tracks. Track 1 (next to the station building) is used for express services. Tracks 2 and 3 (central platform) are used by regional passenger services. Track 4 is used by non-stopping trains towards Stuttgart. Tracks 5 and 6 are no longer used. Track 7, with its side platform, served services on the Lauter Valley Railway. In addition, there are still some freight tracks, but these are only occasionally used for parking wagons.

The station is classified by Deutsche Bahn as a category 4 station.

| Route | | Frequency |
|---|---|---|
| RE 5 | Mosbach-Neckarelz – Heilbronn – Stuttgart – Göppingen – Süßen – Geislingen – Ulm – Aulendorf – Friedrichshafen (– Lindau-Reutin) | Some trains |
| MEX 16 | Stuttgart – Plochingen – Göppingen – Süßen – Geislingen (– Ulm) | every 30 minutes (core route), hourly (whole route) |
