= Geislingen (Steige) station =

Railway station in Geislingen an der Steige, Germany

Geislingen (Steige)
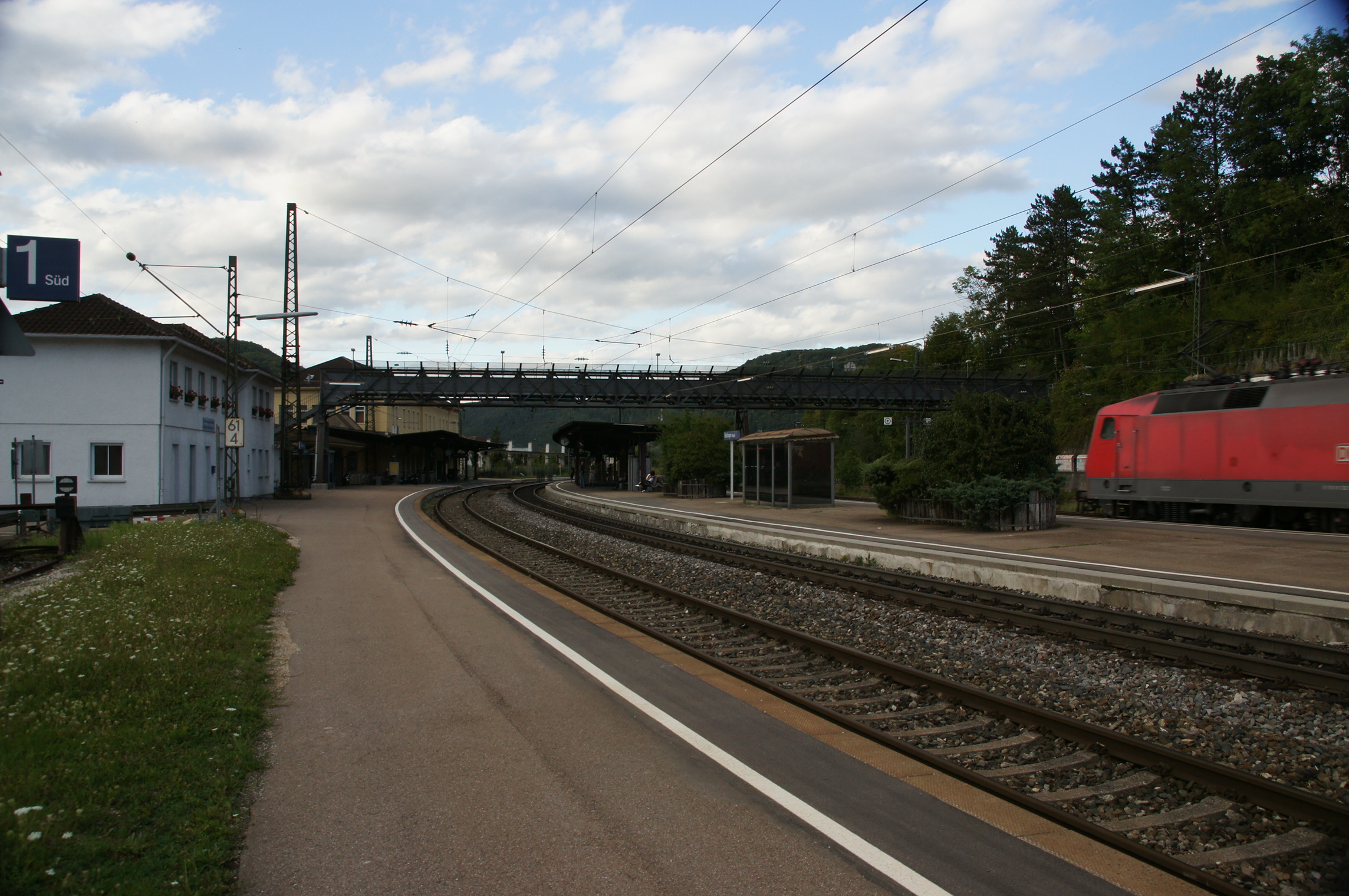

General information
- Location: Am Bahnhof 1, Geislingen an der Steige, Baden-Württemberg; Germany
- Coordinates: 48°37′8″N 9°50′32″E
- Owner: Deutsche Bahn
- Operator: DB Netz; DB Station&Service
- Lines: Fils Valley Railway (km 99.8) (KBS 750); Geislingen an der Steige–Wiesensteig railway (closed); access line to Eybtal reversing station (closed)
- Platforms: 3

Construction
- Accessible: Yes
- Architect: Michael Knoll
- Architectural style: Rundbogenstil

Other information
- Station code: 2045
- DS100 code: TG
- IBNR: 8002218
- Category: 4
- Fare zone: : 7; DING: 240 (VVS transitional tariff)
- Website: www.bahnhof.de

History
- Opened: 14 June 1849

Services
Preceding station	DB Regio Baden-Württemberg	Following station
Göppingen towards Stuttgart Hbf	RE 5	Ulm Hbf towards Lindau-Reutin
Preceding station		Following station
Geislingen (Steige) West towards Stuttgart Hbf	MEX 16	Amstetten (Württ) towards Ulm Hbf
Location

Geislingen (Steige) station is located at the 61.3 kilometre point of the Fils Valley Railway in the German state of Baden-Württemberg. Until May 2000, there was a connection for freight to Geislingen-Altenstadt, a remnant of the former railway to Wiesensteig. The station is served by intercity and regional services.

== History ==
When Georg von Buhler and Carl Christian von Seeger originally planned a railway line from Stuttgart to Ulm, the connection through the Fils valley was in competition with a devious route along the Rems and Brenz valleys. They considered a climb over the Swabian Jura (Schwäbischen Alb) to be impossible.

In the 1840s the Oberamt (district) seat of Geislingen had about 2,300 inhabitants. They lived mostly off the land or operated small businesses based on crafts. Less than one percent of them were employed in factories that were not indigenous to the area. It was not an important trading post despite its location on the Stuttgart–Ulm main road. The building of the road along the ancient track over the Jura that was known as the Geislinger Steige in 1824 did little to improve trade. The poor condition and the steep gradient of the road meant that carts could only climb with difficulty.

The proposal to construct the Eastern Railway gave the councillors of the town and the Oberamt new hope and promised a good connection. On 16 December 1841, they wrote a petition in which they discussed the economic importance of the region and its production of flour, beer, grain, cattle, wood and stones. The potential for passenger traffic was originally considered insignificant. In order to stress the positives of their case, they ignored the looming decline of the town.

The petitioners themselves, however, doubted, that a locomotive would ever be able to climb the Geislinger Steige. Instead, they suggested that the wagons would be uncoupled from the locomotives in Geislingen and they would then be individually pulled up the Jura by horses.

Ultimately, the experts chose the shorter railway line through the Fils valley to Ulm and instructed Michael Knoll to plan and construct the railway ramp through Geislingen, his hometown. The experienced Karl Etzel stood aside for Knoll. Daniel Straub, a miller and a cousin of Knoll, particularly benefited from the construction of the line and established workshops for manufacturing tools and machinery in the Kapell mill and in a newly constructed building on the Geislinger Steige.

Large movements of earth were needed to build the railway to the station and the Geislinger Steige. The station was built north of the town centre in order to make it the focal point of the villages of Altenstadt, Eybach und Weiler. The two-storey station building with a hipped roof, which was designed by Knoll, still exists.

=== Royal Württemberg State Railways period ===
On 14 June 1849, the Royal Württemberg State Railways commenced operations on the Süßen–Geislingen section. The Geislingen–Ulm section was opened on 29 June 1850. All trains on the Geislinger Steige required the assistance of bank engines as far as Amstetten.

Daniel Straub continued to operate his tool making plant and he built an iron foundry and machine shop. This developed into Maschinenfabrik Geislingen AG (Geislingen Machine Factory, MAG) in 1883. Straub founded in 1853 with two partners the Straub & Schweizer metal ware factory, which since 1880 has been called Württembergische Metallwarenfabrik AG (Württemberg Metal Factory, WMF). Thus began the industrialisation of Geislingen.

On 29 June 1852, exactly two years after the inauguration of the Geislinger Steige railway, Michael Knoll died. His friends donated a bust in his honour that originally stood in the west of the station forecourt. The inscription on the base reads:

Dem Erbauer des Eisenbahn-Alb-Übergangs Michael Knoll, Oberbaurat aus Geislingen, gewidmet von seinen Freunden (The builder of the Jura crossing railway, Michael Knoll, master builder from Geislingen, dedicated by his friends).

Between 1859 and 1862, the State Railways duplicated the Eastern Railway from Plochingen to Ulm. The population of Geislingen rose from 3,900 in 1880 to 7,000 people in 1900.

On 21 October 1903, Geislingen was connected by a 21 kilometre-long branch line. The Tälesbahn ran via Überkingen and Deggingen to Wiesensteig. During the construction, the Knoll memorial had to be moved and it was transferred to the Geislinger Steige.

=== Reichsbahn period ===
With the electrification of the Stuttgart–Ulm line, on 1 June 1933, the use of bank engines on the Geislinger Steige was no longer generally necessary, although they are still used for heavy freight trains.

The mine at Geislinger Stauferstollen had its own rail connection to the Tälesbahn before the start of World War II, when the volume of iron ore mined and removed increased. In 1940, Deutsche Reichsbahn opened a reversing station at Eybtal, downhill from Geislingen in order to avoid the need to reverse in Geislingen station. The reversing station operated until 1944.

=== Deutsche Bundesbahn period ===
The post-war economic boom increased private transport. Deutsche Bundesbahn reported declining traffic on the Geislingen–Wiesensteig line. This led to the closure of the Deggingen–Wiesensteig section of the line in 1968. Passenger services operated on the remaining section until 1 June 1980. Freight traffic continued until 29 September 1981.

=== 21st century ===
The final section of the Tälesbahn from Geislingen to Geislingen-Altensteig was closed by Deutsche Bahn in May 2000.

The Art and History Association (Kunst- und Geschichtsverein) of Geislingen had campaigned since 2006 to have the Knoll Memorial returned from the Geislinger Steige to its original location. Since this would have been expensive, the association agreed to have a copy made. Since 9 May 2009, there has again been a monument in honour of Michael Knoll in the station forecourt.

== Rail operations ==
The station is served by regional trains. Until the opening of the Wendlingen–Ulm high-speed railway in December 2022, it was also served by intercity trains. Track 1 (next to the station building) is used for starting and terminating services to and from Göppingen. Track 2 is used by services towards Ulm and track 3 is used for services to Göppingen.

The station is classified by Deutsche Bahn as a category 4 station.

=== Regional services ===
Route		Frequency
RE 5	Stuttgart – Esslingen – Plochingen – Göppingen – Geislingen (Steige) – Ulm – Aulendorf – Friedrichshafen (– Lindau-Reutin)	60 minutes
MEX 16	Stuttgart – Esslingen – Plochingen – Göppingen – Süßen – Geislingen (Steige) (– Ulm)	30 minutes
