= Johann Georg Fischer =

German poet and playwright (1816–1897)

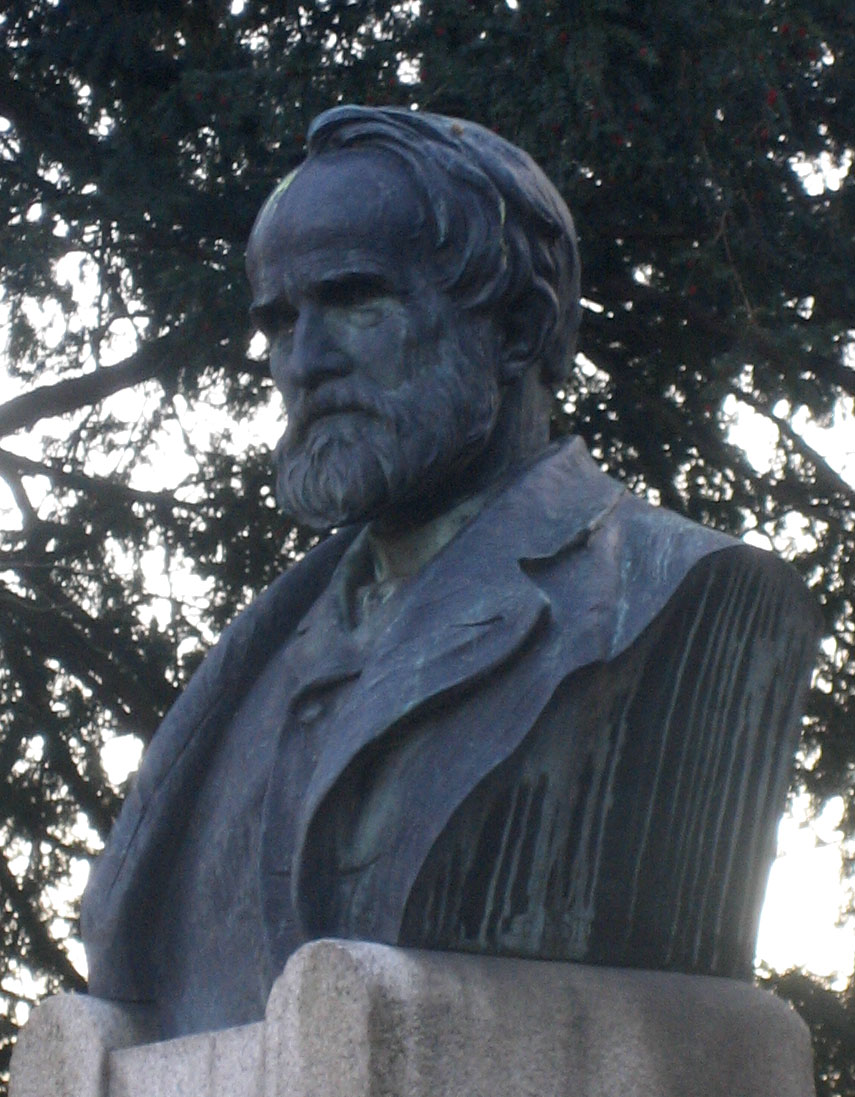
- Bust by Emil Kiemlen, 1900

Johann Georg Fischer (25 October 1816 – 4 May 1897) was a German poet and playwright.

== Biography ==
Fischer was born in Groß-Süßen, Württemberg. His father was a carpenter, who died early.

After Johann finished his studies in Tübingen between 1831 and 1833, he began to work as a teacher assistant at different places, including Langenau and Ulm. After further study as a school teacher, he went to Stuttgart in 1845 to teach at the elementary school. He became school master as well as the leader of the economic school in the city. In 1857 he gained the title of Doctor of Philosophy. Between 1862 and 1885, he worked as a professor later as a master professor at the Oberen Stuttgarter Realschule.

As a poet, Fischer may be regarded as the last noteworthy representative of the traditional Swabian School. He was not in sympathy with the naturalism of his time, and was influenced chiefly by the poetry of his countryman Schiller. However, several of his productions suggest the influence of Goethe, Hölderlin, and Mörike.

Fischer developed his unique style in poetry and writing dramas during his years in Stuttgart. Early in life, he showed deep interest in nature and many of his poems show this influence. He excelled in popular songs and ballads, and in his love songs nobly idealized nature and passion. His 24 speeches on the occasion of the birthday of Schiller were especially popular.

For his works, he gained the title of honorary citizen in Marbach am Neckar. Some of his admirers were wont to call him “Der schwabische Frauenlob” (the Swabian praiser of women). His seventieth birthday was a huge festival in Stuttgart. He died in Stuttgart.

== Works ==
His four dramas are:

- Saul (1862)
- Friedrich II von Hohenstaufen (1863)
- Florian Geyer (1866)
- Kaiser Maximilian von Mexico (1868)

His other works, practically all of them published in Stuttgart, were:

- Gedichte (1838)
- Dichtungen (1841)
- Gedichte (1854)
- Aus dem Leben der Vögel (1863) In this work, he notes the characteristic phenomena of the psychic life of animals with the acuteness of a naturalist and the sympathy of a poet.
- Neue Gedichte (1865)
- Den Deutschen Frauen (1869)
- Aus Frischer Luft (1872)
- Neue Lieder (1876)
- Merlin. Ein Liederzyklus (1877)
- Der Glückliche Knecht. Ein Idyll (1881)
- Auf dem Heimweg (1891)
- Mit Achtzig Jahren (1896)
