= Süßen =

- Town
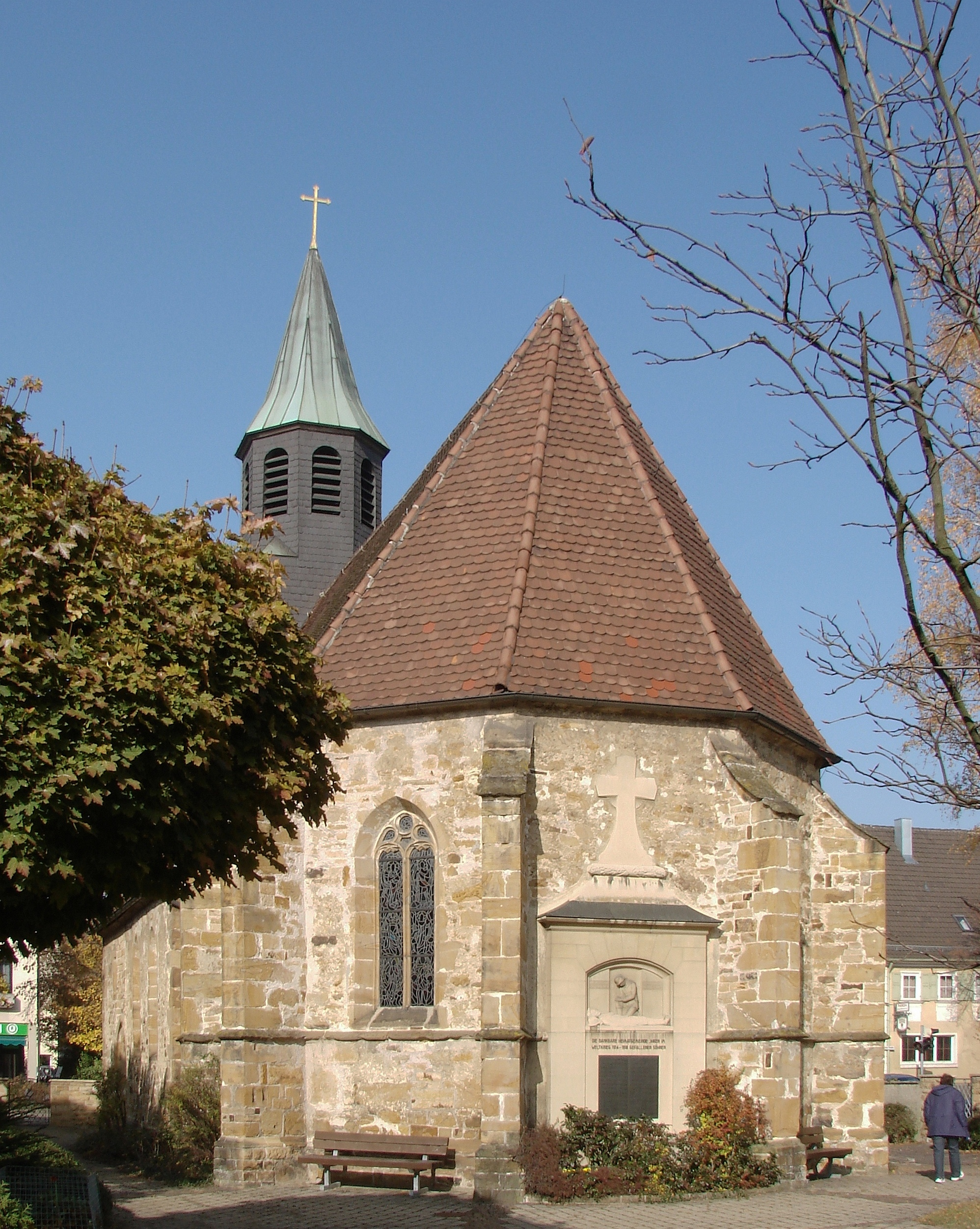
- Church of the Virgin Mary

- Coat of arms

- Location of Süßen within Göppingen district
- Interactive map of Süßen
- Location within Germany Location within Baden-Württemberg
- Coordinates: 48°40′47″N 9°45′27″E
- Country: Germany
- State: Baden-Württemberg
- Admin. region: Stuttgart
- District: Göppingen

Government
  - Mayor (2018–26): Marc Kersting (CDU)

Area
  - Total: 12.79 km^{2} (4.94 sq mi)
- Elevation: 364 m (1,194 ft)

Population (2025-12-31)
  - Total: 10,115
  - Density: 790.9/km^{2} (2,048/sq mi)
- Time zone: UTC+01:00 (CET)
  - Summer (DST): UTC+02:00 (CEST)
- Postal codes: 73079
- Dialling codes: 07162
- Vehicle registration: GP
- Website: www.suessen.de

Süßen (German pronunciation: [ˈzyːsn̩]; or Süssen) is a town in the district of Göppingen in Baden-Württemberg in southern Germany. It is located on the river Fils 8 km east of Göppingen, near Stuttgart.

== History ==
Süßen was first mentioned with the name of Siezun in the Lorsch codex in 1071. Großsüßen (Greater Süßen) was at first in the possession of the count of Helfenstein, who, in 1382 pledged it to the city of Ulm. Kleinsüßen (Smaller Süßen), though, was in the hands of the family Pappenheim. They inherited the land from the landlords of Bubenhofen.

In the Mediatization in 1802, Großsüßen was given to Bavaria, but in 1810, the lands were given back, in an exchange contract to Württemberg. Kleinsüßen, though, was never Bavarian land. After the exchange, both places, Groß- and Kleinsüßen, were assigned under the Head Office of Geislingen.

With the opening of the Fils Valley Railway and Süßen station in 1847, Kleinsüßen was connected to the public transportation.

In 1933, the two townships, Großsüßen and Kleinsüßen, were unified and the settlement Süßen was formed. The war reform in 1938 assigned the town to the region of Göppingen.

On July 1, 1996, Süßen obtained the title of town.

== Religion ==
In 1539, Protestantism was officially introduced in Großsüßen, being part of Ulm. Kleinsüßen, owned by the Pappenheims, remained Roman Catholic.

== Population ==
The development of the population

Date	Population
1837	1,440
1907	2,425
1939	3,925
1950	5.946
1970	8.258
1983	8.433
2007	10.254

== Coat of arms and flag ==
The official coat of arms contains a black-white part and three red zig-zag lines. This shield became the official coat of arms in 1933. The red zig-zag lines represent the landlords of Bubenhofen, the former landowners. The black-white part represents the connections to Ulm. The red-white flag of the town was given on 13 March 1958 by the Ministry of Internal Affairs.

== Partnerships ==
Süßen is a partner town of the Hungarian Törökbálint. This connection was established, when on 26. February 1946 the first Hungarian-Germans (266 of them) arrived from Törökbálint to Süßen, chased away by the Hungarian communists and the arriving Soviets.

== Politics ==
=== Local council ===
The local council in Süßen has 18 members. The elections in Baden-Württemberg on 25 May 2014 had these results: The Gemeinderat is the elected Gemeinderäte and the mayor as chairman.

Parteien und Wählergemeinschaften		% 2014	Sitze; 2014	% 2009	Sitze; 2009
CDU	Christlich Demokratische Union Deutschlands	29,44	5	27,00	5
SPD	Sozialdemokratische Partei Deutschlands	25,95	5	22,40	4
FDP-AFW	Freie Demokratische Partei/Allgemeine Freie Wähler Süßen	22,68	4	29,30	5
Grüne	Alliance '90/The Greens	21,93	4	21,40	4
gesamt		100,0	18	100,0	18
Wahlbeteiligung		44,89 %		48,60 %	

== Events ==
- Easter Market
- Schützenfest: on the weekend following June 2
- Town Festival, Stadtfest: on the weekend following July 2
- Christmas market: on Saturday before the second advent

== Buildings ==
- A historic well in the town centre. Not really an "old" well, but it represents the history of Süßen. The well itself was built in 1981, planned by Emil Jo Homolka.
- The Gothic Ulrich Church
- The old Gothic Maria Church
- The new Maria Church in Expressionistic style, built in 1929
- The memorial of the poet Johann Georg Fischer on the Heidenheimer street
