= Karl Etzel =

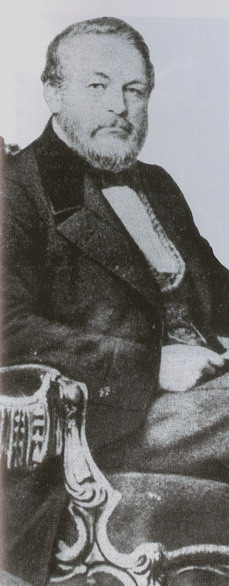
Karl Etzel

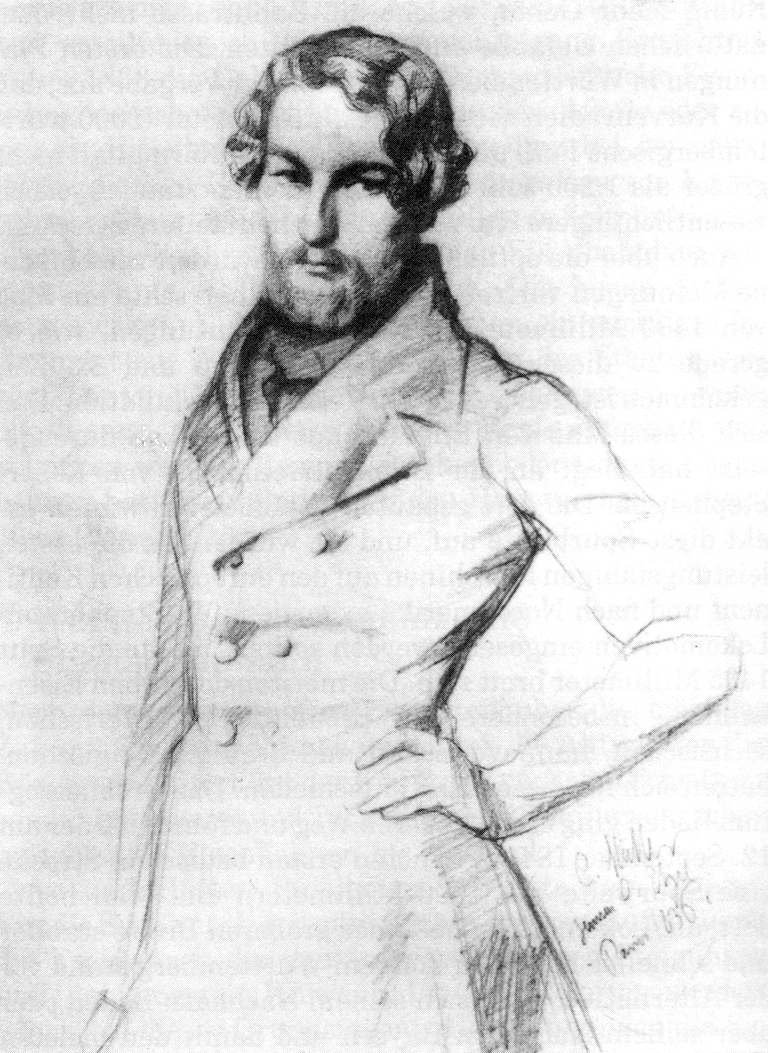
Karl Etzelin 1836

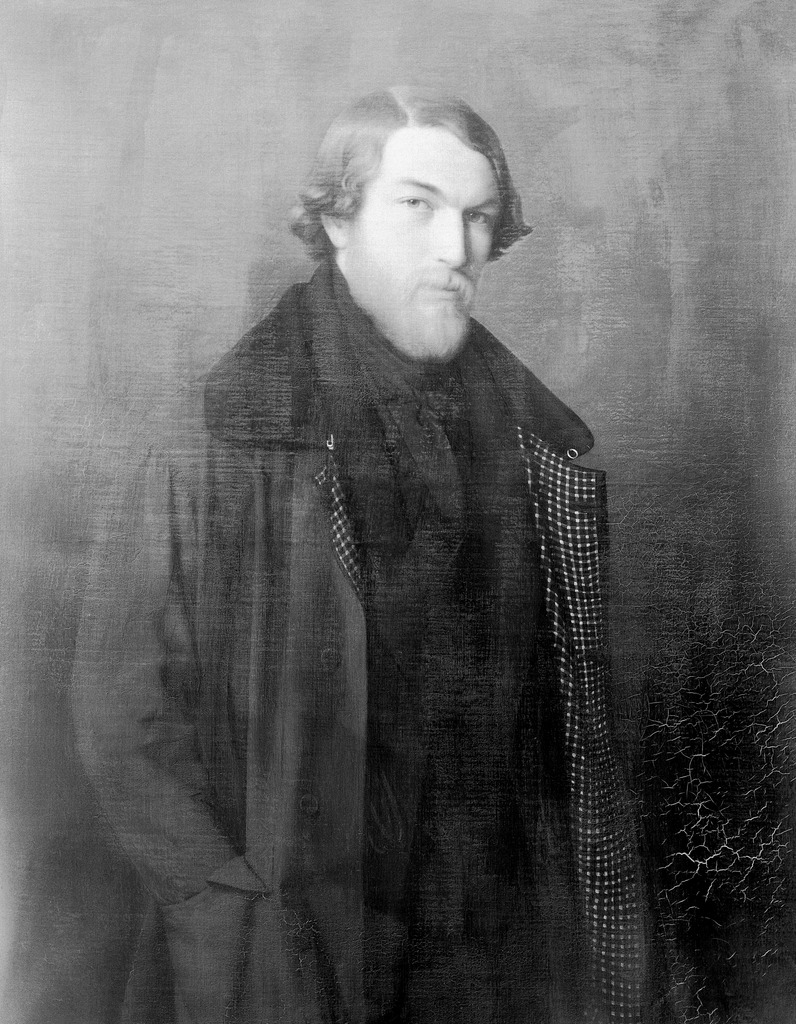
Karl Etzel in 1839

Karl von Etzel (old spelling Carl von Etzel; 6 January 1812 – 2 May 1865) was a German railway engineer and architect. He created many famous railway lines, bridges and viaducts, including the Bietigheim Enz Valley Viaduct.

== Life ==
Karl Etzel was the son of the Stuttgart city planner Gottlieb Christian Eberhard von Etzel, the builder of the Neuen Weinsteige, a picturesque road in southeastern Stuttgart. Because his father had built houses in Heilbronn for the Rauch and Mertz families in 1811–1812, it was commonly believed that he was born in Heilbronn, but his birth is registered in the parish register of Stuttgart.

The young Etzel studied from 1831 to 1835 with Nikolaus Friedrich von Thouret. In 1835 Karl von Etzel worked on construction projects in France, including the Paris (Saint-Lazare)–Saint-Germain railway with the bridge over the Seine at Asnières (destroyed during the February Revolution of 1848 and later rebuilt). In 1837 he was the Chief Engineer for the construction of the Versailles Railway.

In 1840, he went to Vienna, where he oversaw several building projects. Together with Ludwig Förster, he rebuilt the first Dianabad with a steel hall, making it the first indoor bath house in continental Europe. In 1843, he was employed as a town planner in Württemberg, where he was responsible for the construction of the first railways in Württemberg, including the Fils Valley Railway over the Geislinger Steige—the first railway crossing of a mountain range in Europe. He built the first Stuttgart Central Station, opened on 26 September 1846.

In 1853, Etzel joined the Swiss Central Railway as a construction manager and he oversaw the construction of the Hauenstein line, starting with the original Hauenstein tunnel.

He then created his most famous and greatest work in Austria, the Brenner Railway (1864–1867), although he did not live to see its completion.

Etzel suffered a stroke on 13 November 1864 and therefore requested retirement. He died on 2 May 1865 in Kemmelbach between Vienna and Linz of a second stroke during a train ride on a special train to Stuttgart-Cannstatt, where he wanted to retire to live in the Villa Etzel, which had been built and furnished to his designs.

During his life Etzel was in charge of the construction of more than 1,500 kilometres of railways. He had also written several literary works since 1844. He edited a few articles for the Stuttgarter Eisenbahn-Zeitung (Stuttgart railway newspaper). His published instructions were written with an unsurpassed brevity.
