= Verner Hans Puurand =

Estonian politician

Verner Hans Puurand (until 1938 Puurmann; 14 September 1904 – 12 June 1983) was an Estonian Naval officer and politician. From 1973 to 1977 he was a minister of Estonian government-in-exile.

He was born in Tapa parish, Estonia. In 1928 he graduated from Tondi military school.

In the 1930s, he was sent to Britain to supervise the construction of two submarines for the Estonian navy, the Lembit and the Kalev.

In 1939 he was temporary commander of the submarine Kalev. During World War II, he collaborated with the Germans. In 1944 he fled to Germany, then later to Australia. He died in Brisbane in 1983.

Since he is regarded as the founder of the Estonian submarine fleet, a monument to his memory was unveiled in his birthplace, the village of Naistevälja in Tapa parish, Lääne-Virumaa county, on 25 June 2014.
