= DB Class 151 =

Electric locomotive type

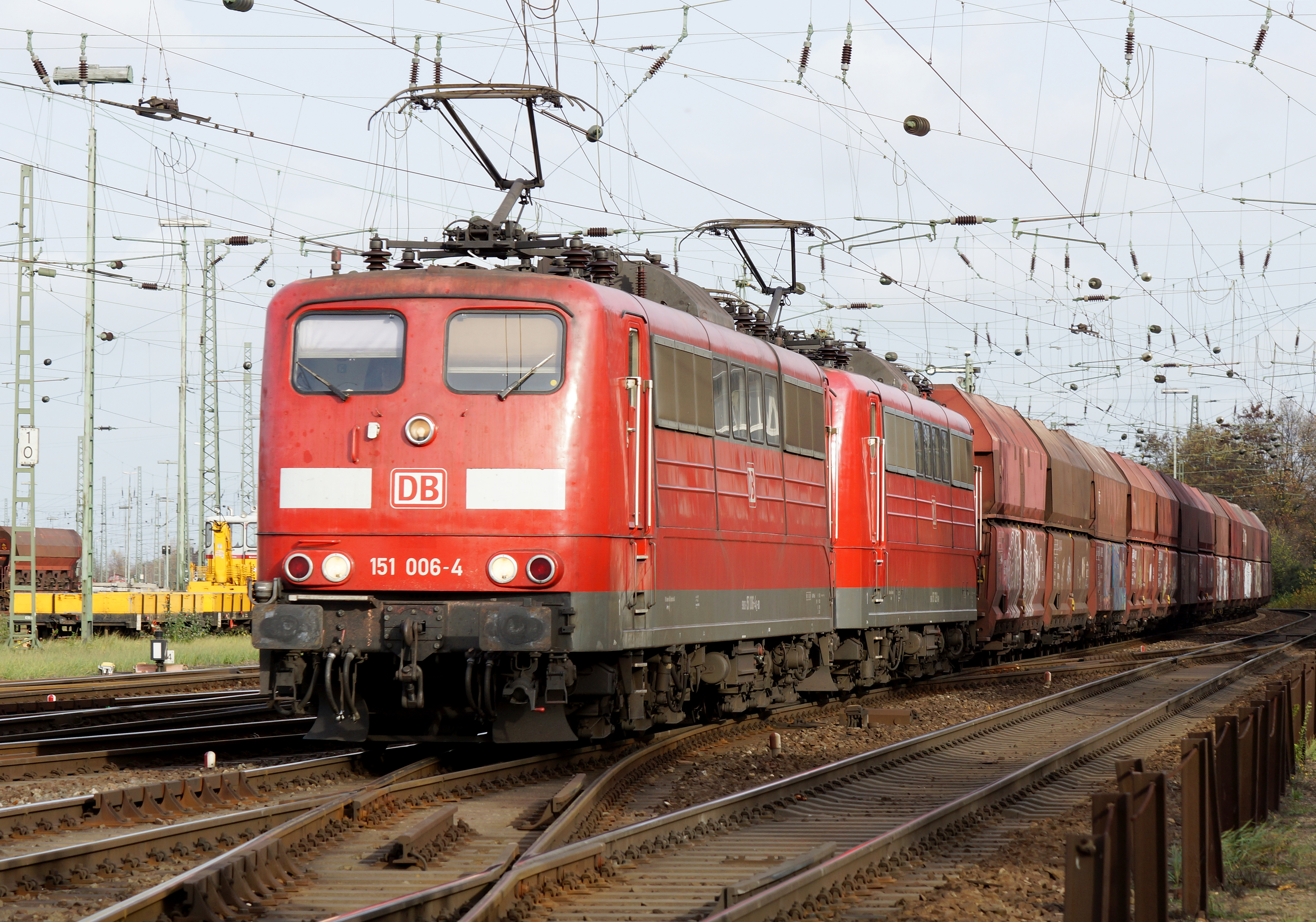
- Two Class 151 locomotives hauling a freight train in November 2015
Type and origin
- Power type: Electric
- Builder: AEG, BBC, Henschel, Krauss-Maffei, Krupp, Siemens
- Build date: 1972–1978
- Total produced: 170
Specifications
- Configuration
  - UIC: Co′Co′
- Gauge: 1,435 mm (4 ft 8 1/2 in) standard gauge
- Length: 19,490 mm (63 ft 11 3/8 in)
- Axle load: 19.7 t (19.4 long tons; 21.7 short tons)
- Loco weight: 118 t (116 long tons; 130 short tons)
- Electric system/s: 15 kV 16.7 Hz Catenary
- Current pickup(s): Pantograph
- Safety systems: InduSi, SiFa, PZB90
Performance figures
- Maximum speed: 120 km/h (75 mph)
- Power output: 6,288 kW (8,432 hp)
- Tractive effort: Continuous: 250 kN (56,000 lb_{f}), Starting: 395 kN (89,000 lb_{f})
Career
- Class: 151; 162 (Hector Rail)
- Locale: Germany
- Delivered: 1972

The Class 151 is an electric heavy freight locomotive built for German Federal Railways between 1972 and 1978. They were built as a replacement for the ageing Class 150, in order to cope with the increased requirements of this type of locomotive, in particular the desire of a 120 km/h (75 mph) top speed.

Locomotives of Hector Rail are designated as Class 162.

== Technical specifications ==
The locomotives have a Co-Co wheel arrangement, and a weight of 118 tonnes (116 long tons; 130 short tons).

== History ==
On 21 November 1972 the first locomotive, 151 001, was delivered by AEG and Krupp. It was followed by 11 further pilot locomotives, which were extensively tested before the main order was built. Altogether 170 locomotives were built. Originally the Class 151 locomotives were also suitable for passenger service, however it is not possible anymore due to the lack of required safety equipment.

Deutsche Bahn's Class 151 fleet was sold to leasing company Railpool in 2017.

Saar-Rail bought three Class 151 locomotives in 2018. Two of them operate on freight services with torpedo cars, while one locomotive serves as a spare parts donor.

As of 2020, 34 locomotives are in service with private railway companies. DB Cargo has leased 19 locomotives.

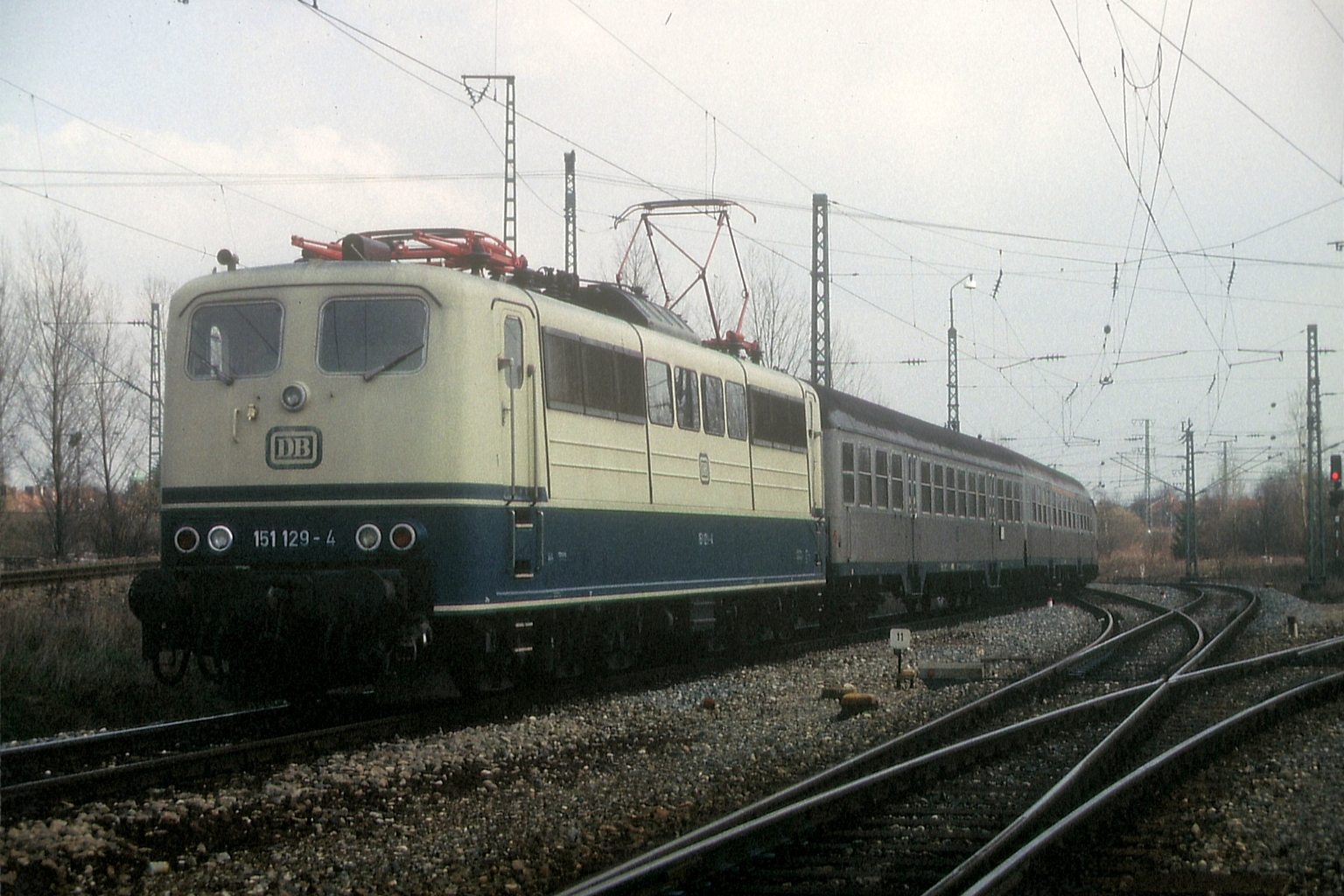
Class 151 locomotive hauling a passenger train in April 1984

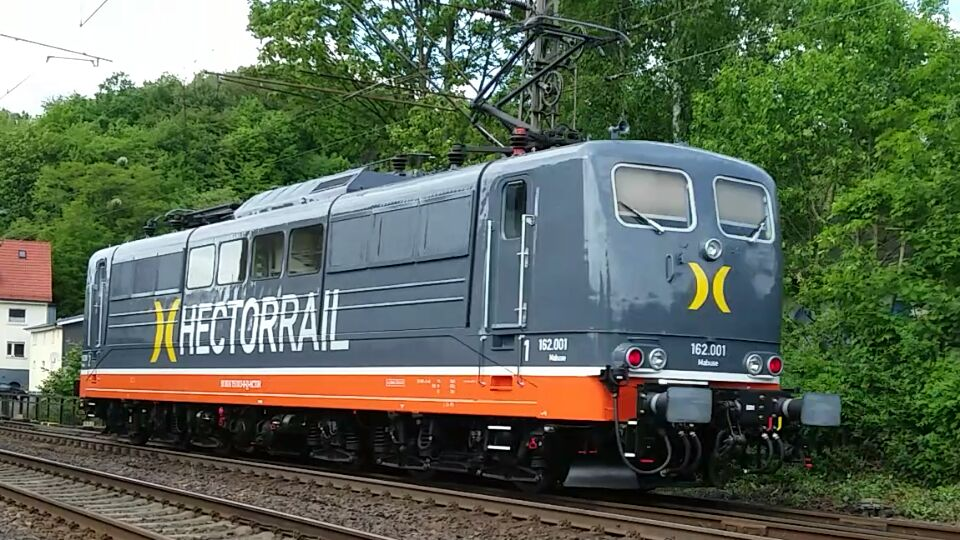
Hector Rail 151

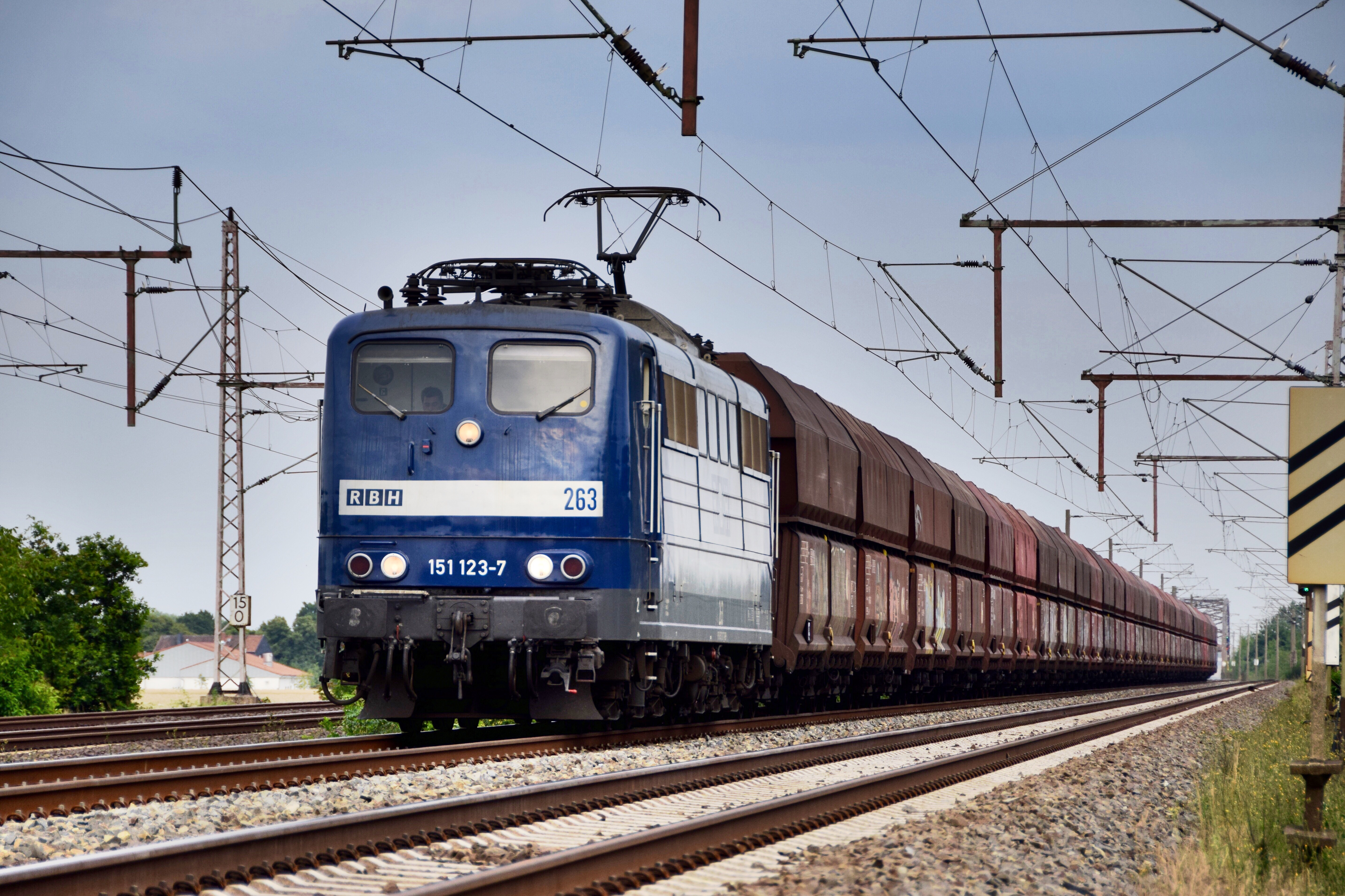
RBH Logistics 151 123

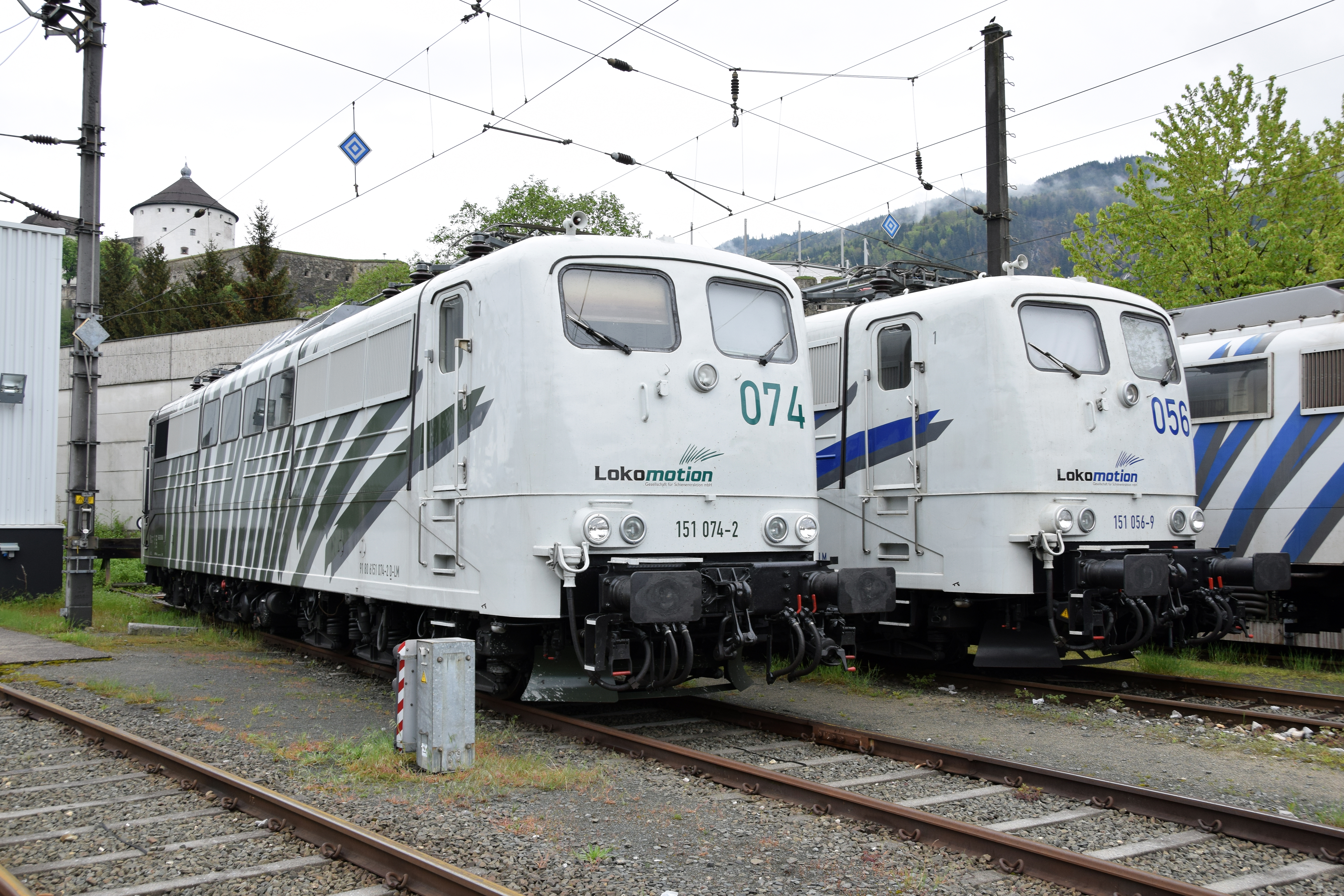
Two Class 151 locomotives of Lokomotion

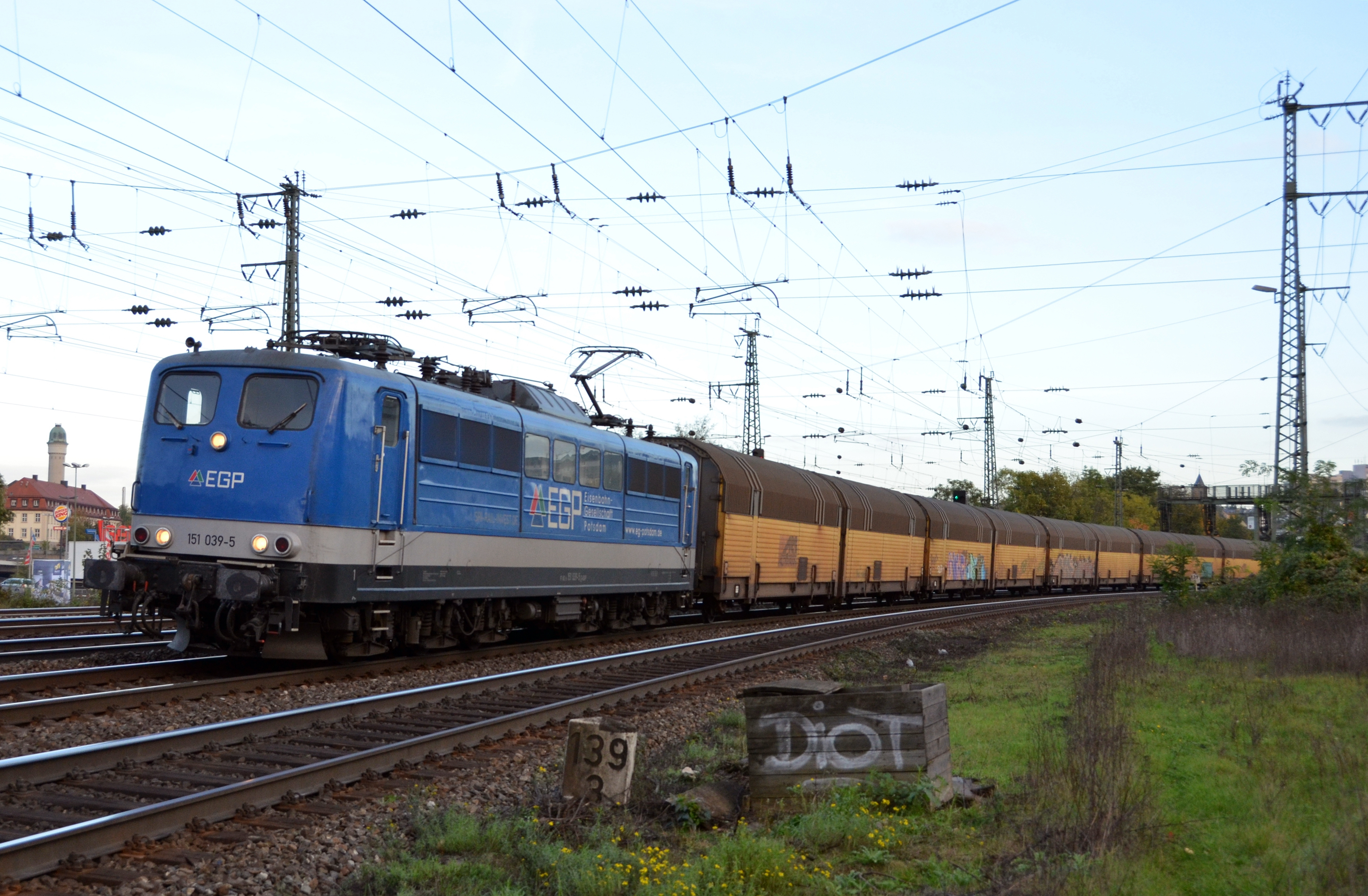
151 039 in EGP livery
