= Göppingen station =

Railway station in Göppingen, Germany

Göppingen
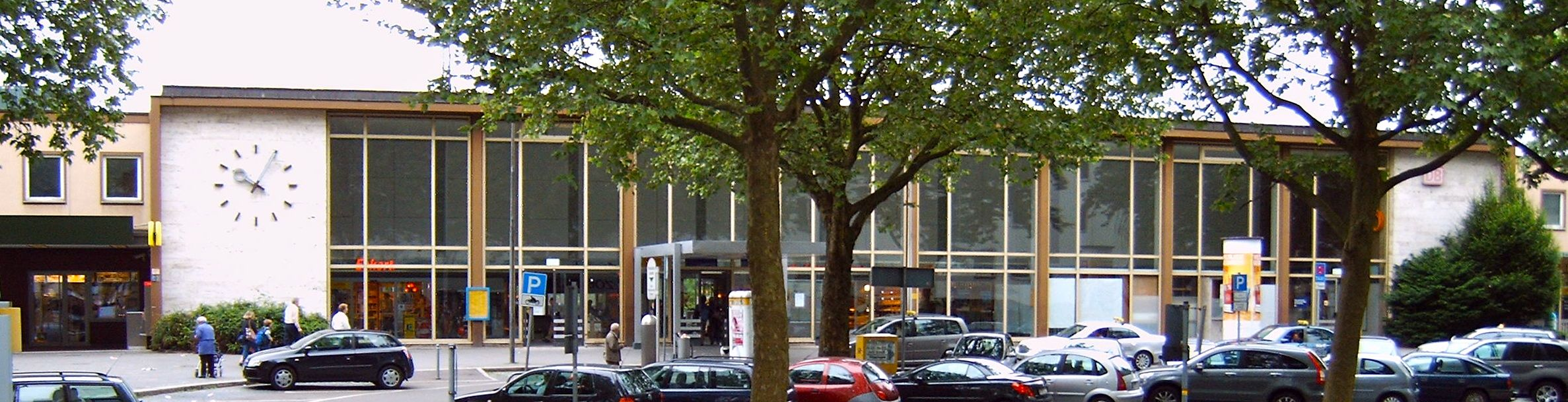
- Entrance building

General information
- Location: Am Bahnhof 1, Göppingen, Baden-Württemberg; Germany
- Coordinates: 48°42′1″N 9°39′8″E
- Line: Fils Valley Railway
- Platforms: 7

Construction
- Accessible: Yes
- Architect: Hellmut Kasel

Other information
- Station code: 2189
- DS100 code: TGO
- IBNR: 8000127
- Category: 3
- Fare zone: : 5 and 6
- Website: www.bahnhof.de

History
- Opened: 1847
Services
Preceding station	DB Fernverkehr	Following station
Plochingen towards Dortmund Hbf	IC 55 Allgäu	Ulm Hbf towards Oberstdorf
Preceding station	DB Regio Baden-Württemberg	Following station
Plochingen towards Stuttgart Hbf	RE 5	Geislingen (Steige) towards Lindau-Reutin
Preceding station		Following station
Faurndau towards Stuttgart Hbf	MEX 16	Eislingen (Fils) towards Ulm Hbf
Preceding station	Croatian Railways	Following station
Stuttgart Hbf Terminus	EuroNight	Ulm Hbf towards Zagreb
Location

Göppingen station is a station in the town of Göppingen in the German state of Baden-Württemberg. It is a transit station and is situated km 42.1 from Stuttgart on the Fils Valley Railway, which was completed in 1850 from Stuttgart to Ulm.

== Location ==
The station is located on the southern edge of the inner city of Göppingen. To its east are large marshalling and freight yards, which are still used occasionally. To its west is a smaller disused freight yard with loading docks and the central bus station.

== Station layout ==
The station consists of an entrance building, which houses a restaurant, two kiosks, a bakery, a bookstore and a travel centre. The former baggage and express freight facility is not used anymore.

It has seven platform tracks, tracks 1 to 7. Only tracks 4 and 6 are regularly used for passenger trains. Only a few regional trains run on tracks 1 and 3. Platform track 5 is used once a day by a City Night Line train from Paris, continuing to Munich.

Track 1 was used until 1986, for traffic on the disused Hohenstaufen Railway (Hohenstaufenbahn) to Schwäbisch Gmünd. Track 7 was used for traffic of the disused Voralb Railway (Voralbbahn) to Boll (passenger service closed on 27 May 1989 and it closed completely on 15 December 1997). In addition, at the eastern end of the platform that serves tracks 6 and 7 there is a dock platform, which formerly bore the number 13, and was used by most of the trains on the Voralb Railway.

The sprawling marshalling yard is now closed, although part of it near the station is used by the construction company Leonhard Weiss. All the other industrial sidings are closed. Similarly, the container terminal, which in the first years of the 1970s was one of the most modern facilities of its kind, was closed down in the mid 1990s.

== History ==
The station was first opened on 11 October 1847 when the Fils Valley Railway (Filstalbahn) reached Göppingen, the line was completed to Ulm in 1850.

On 6 April 1893, the plans for the extension of the main building was approved and then executed. Between 1914 and 1917, the station was expanded and rebuilt again to handle traffic on the new Hohenstaufen Railway to Schwäbisch Gmünd and the then projected Voralb Railway to Boll.

During the Second World War an air raid shelter for 80 people was built in the station forecourt.

On 27 May 1964 today's station building, designed by Hellmut Kasel, was opened on schedule after two years of construction. In the late 1960s, a new freight terminal building was built, but it is no longer used.

== Rail services ==
One InterCity service operates on the Stuttgart–Ulm line and stops at Göppingen station. It is served hourly by Regional-Express services between Stuttgart to Ulm and every two-hours by Interregio-Express services between Stuttgart and Friedrichshafen. Between Plochingen and Geislingen an der Steige hourly Regionalbahn services also stop in Göppingen. In the 2026 timetable, the following services stopped at the station:

Line	Route	Frequency
ICE 55	Dortmund – Düsseldorf – Cologne – Bonn – Koblenz – Mainz – Mannheim – Heidelberg – Stuttgart – Göppingen – Ulm – Memmingen – Kempten – Oberstdorf	1 train towards Oberstdorf
RE 5	Stuttgart – Plochingen – Göppingen – Geislingen (Steige) – Ulm – Aulendorf – Friedrichshafen	120
MEX 16	Stuttgart – Bad Cannstatt – Esslingen (Neckar) – Plochingen – Göppingen – Geislingen (Steige) (– Ulm)	30 to Geislingen, 60 to Ulm
