= Amstetten (Württemberg) =

- Municipality
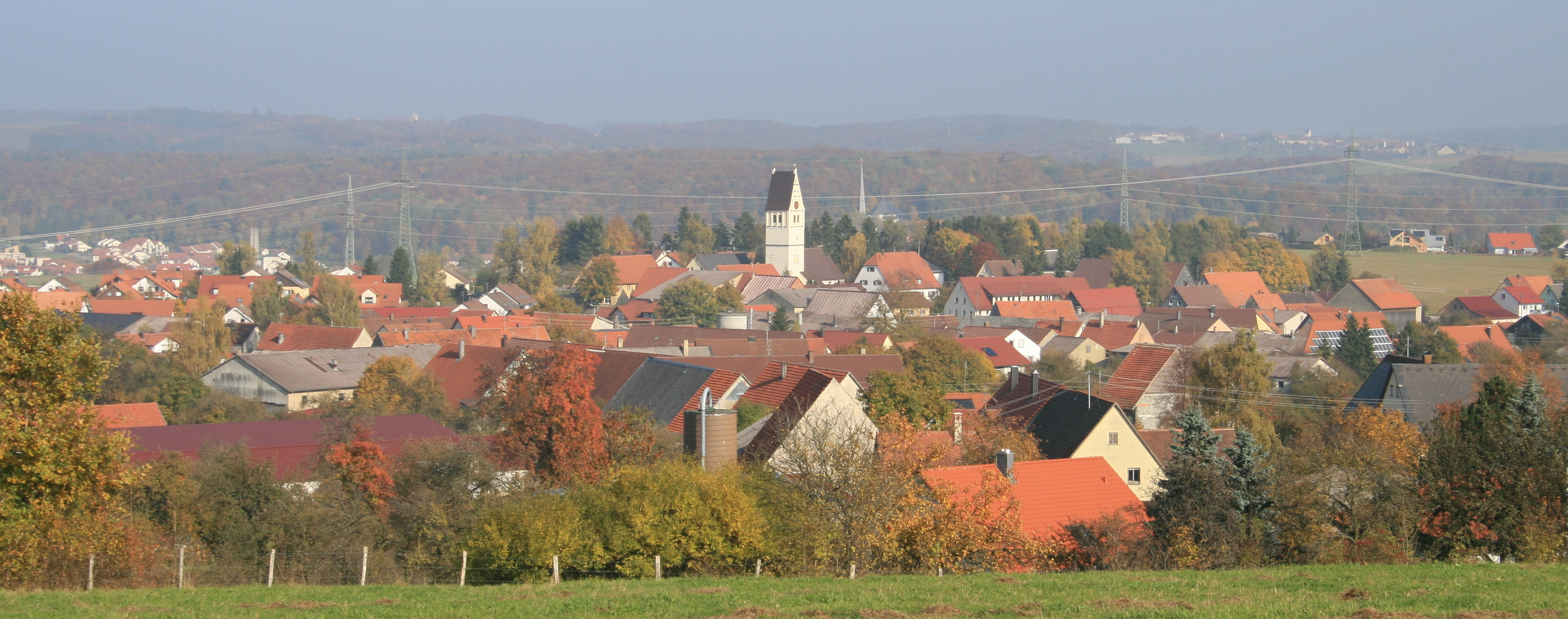
- Old village, called Amstetten-Dorf, as seen from the south-west

- Coat of arms

- Location of Amstetten within Alb-Donau-Kreis district
- Interactive map of Amstetten
- Location within Germany Location within Baden-Württemberg
- Coordinates: 48°34′46″N 9°52′28″E
- Country: Germany
- State: Baden-Württemberg
- Admin. region: Tübingen
- District: Alb-Donau-Kreis
- Subdivisions: 6

Government
  - Mayor (2018–26): Johannes Raab

Area
  - Total: 49.80 km^{2} (19.23 sq mi)
- Elevation: 628 m (2,060 ft)

Population (2025-12-31)
  - Total: 4,248
  - Density: 85.30/km^{2} (220.9/sq mi)
- Time zone: UTC+01:00 (CET)
  - Summer (DST): UTC+02:00 (CEST)
- Postal codes: 73338–73340
- Dialling codes: 07331
- Vehicle registration: UL
- Website: www.amstetten.de

Amstetten (German pronunciation: [ˌamˈʃtɛtn̩]) is a municipality in Alb-Donau-Kreis, 20 kilometers north-west of Ulm in Baden-Württemberg, Germany.

== Municipality arrangement ==
Amstetten includes the districts Bräunisheim, Hofstett-Emerbuch, Reutti, Schalkstetten and Stubersheim. The place Amstetten itself is divided into the old Amstetten-Dorf and the newly created after the railway construction Amstetten Station.

== History ==
Traces of a Roman road station at the top of the Geislinger Steige demonstrate the important traffic geographical position. In Amstetten no traces of an early medieval settlement were found. However, finds from the districts Schalkstetten, Bräunisheim and Stubersheim show a settlement at least since the Merovingian dynasty. The first mention of Amstetten dates back to 1275 in the Liber decimationis, the tenth book of the Bishopric of Constance. In the late Middle Ages, the region was mainly dominated by the House of Helfenstein. However, they had to mortgage their possession in the late 14th century to the imperial city of Ulm.

== Crest ==
The coat of arms shows on silver (white) base a black Shepherd shovel, which is covered with a silver (white) five-spoke wheel. The town flag corresponds with this black and white crest. Emblem and flag were awarded in 1958. The colors of the emblem reminiscent of the city of Ulm to where Amstetten once belonged. The Shepherd shovel recalls the formerly widespread sheep farming and the five-spoke wheel remembered as in the area symbol transport and industry to the train station, the Amstetten owes its economic development.

== Partnerships ==
Amstetten maintains a partnership to Celles-sur-Belle in France since 1990.

== Transport ==
Amstetten is located on the B 10 Stuttgart – Ulm.

== Railroad / branch lines ==
The railway line Stuttgart-Ulm-Munich (Fils Valley Railway) runs through the municipality.

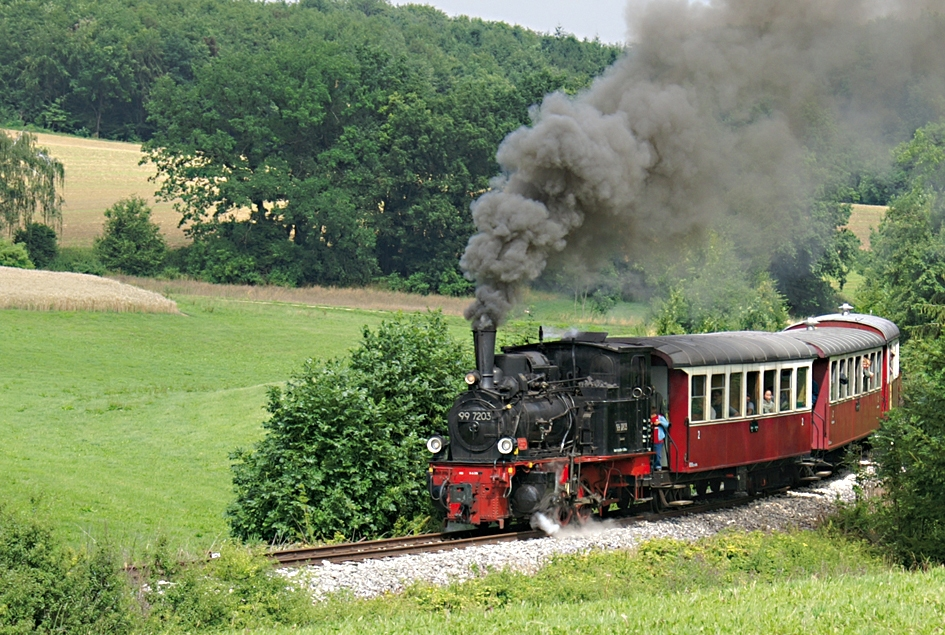
Narrow gauge railway Amstetten–Oppingen

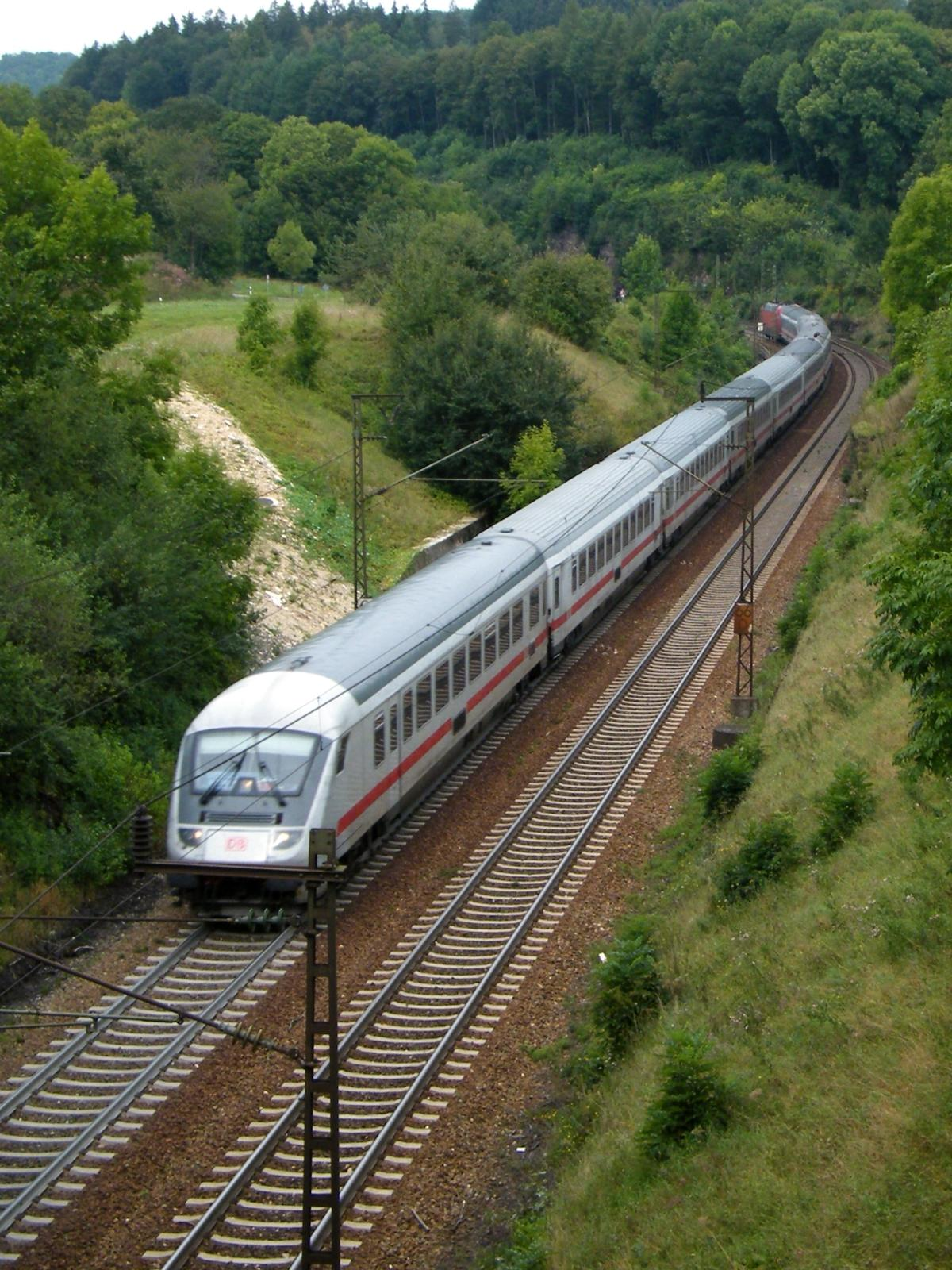
EC on the Geislinger Steige

The Amstetten station had earlier more importance by the connection of two branch lines (Amstetten-Laichingen) and the location at the top of the Geislinger Steige. Today drive on the secondary rails temporarily two museum railways. The local railway Amstetten-Gerstetten (1435 mm) operates on a 20-kilometer route to Gerstetten. The Albbähnle after Oppingen (1000 mm gauge) runs along a section of the former railway line to Laichingen. After its closure in 1985, the breakdown of the six-kilometer route between Amstetten and Oppingen could be prevented.

== Sports ==
The SV Amstetten 1946 is the local sports club with the divisions football, tennis, handball and gymnastics. It maintains two large sports fields, a clubhouse and a tennis hall with outdoor facilities. The district Stubersheim had in Germany in the season 2010/2011 the football team with the fewest points and most goals conceded per game on average 13.

== Notable people ==
- Benedictus Ducis, (1492–1544), worked from 1533 in Stubersheim, from 1535 in Schalkstetten, parson, humanist and a Renaissance composer.
- Jakob Stoller, (1873–1930), geologian and university teacher
- Wilhelm Stoller, (1884–1970), diplomat
