= Fils Valley Railway =

Train line in Baden-Württemburg

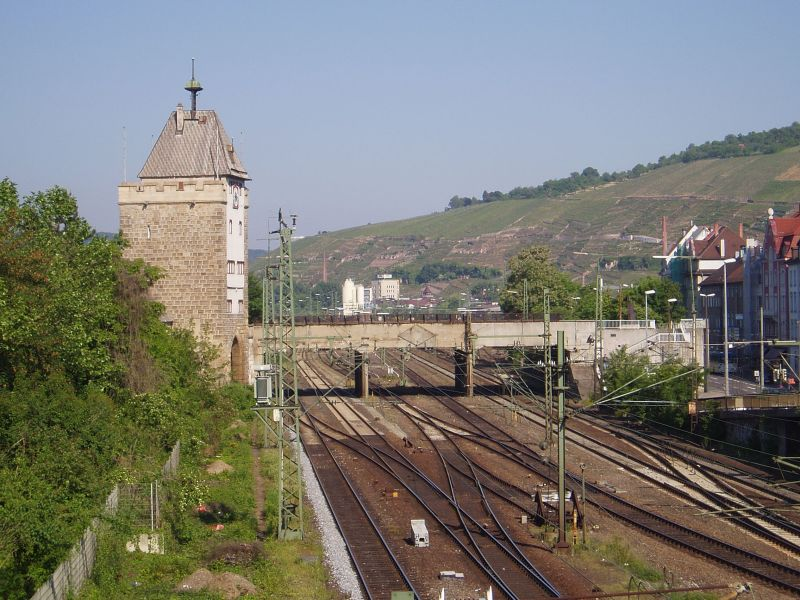
- The Fils Valley Railway in Esslingen

Overview
- Native name: Filstalbahn
- Locale: Baden-Württemberg, Germany
- Termini: Stuttgart; Ulm

Service
- Route number: 750

Technical
- Line length: 94 km (58 mi)
- Track gauge: 1,435 mm (4 ft 8 1/2 in)
- Electrification: 15 kV 16.7 Hz AC

The Fils Valley Railway (German: Filstalbahn [ˈfɪlstaːlˌbaːn], historically Filsbahn or Württembergische Ostbahn—Württemberg Eastern Railway) designates the Württemberg line from Stuttgart via Göppingen to Ulm. It runs from Plochingen to Geislingen an der Steige through the Fils Valley.

== History ==
=== Construction ===
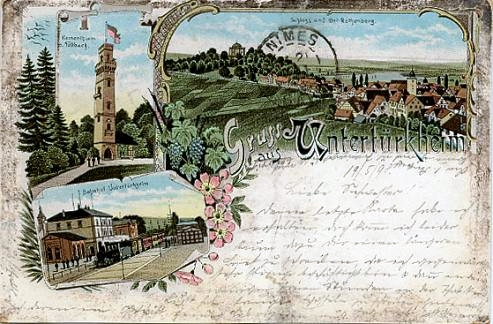
Untertürkheim station in 1898

The Fils Valley Railway was built as part of the first railway line in Württemberg connecting the navigable Neckar in Heilbronn via Stuttgart with the navigable Danube at Ulm, with a further connection from Ulm to Lake Constance.

The Stuttgart-Esslingen section of the line was built as part of the Central Railway (Zentralbahn) between 1844 and 1846. The line was completed between Cannstatt and Esslingen on 22 October 1845 and the Rosenstein Tunnel was completed on 4 July 1846, allowing the first train to run into Stuttgart station on 26 September 1846. It was extended to Plochingen in December 1846 and on 28 June 1850, the first train rolled over the new single-track line of the Royal Württemberg State Railways (Königlich Württembergische Staats-Eisenbahnen). The line is also considered as the first railway to cross a low mountain range in Europe because of the Geislinger Steige (Geislingen Ramp). The upward gradient amounts to 1:44.5 or 2.2%.

=== Electrification ===
The line was electrified in 1933. Before that special helper engines helped push trains up the Geislinger Steige. Freight trains are still pushed up the slope by additional Class 151 locomotives between Geislingen West and Amstetten.

=== War damage ===
The Rosenstein Bridge across the Neckar in Stuttgart was destroyed in the Second World War. Until its replacement by a temporary bridge, all services ended in Bad Cannstatt station, and a shuttle service operated between the Rosenstein Tunnel at the Neckar and Stuttgart Hauptbahnhof.

=== Development plans ===
Due to the high traffic levels on this line, the 1985 federal transport plan contained proposals for sections of new and upgraded track for this route. Planning options ranged from the upgrade of the existing line (which would not have permitted high-speed services) to the building of a completely new line between Plochingen and Günzburg, bypassing Ulm. All options considered would bypass the difficult Geislinger Steige section. In 2007, as part of the project Stuttgart 21, the option being pursued is the construction of the Wendlingen–Ulm high-speed railway, which would mean that long-distance service would no longer utilize the Fils Valley Railway.

== Operations ==
=== Schedule and vehicles ===
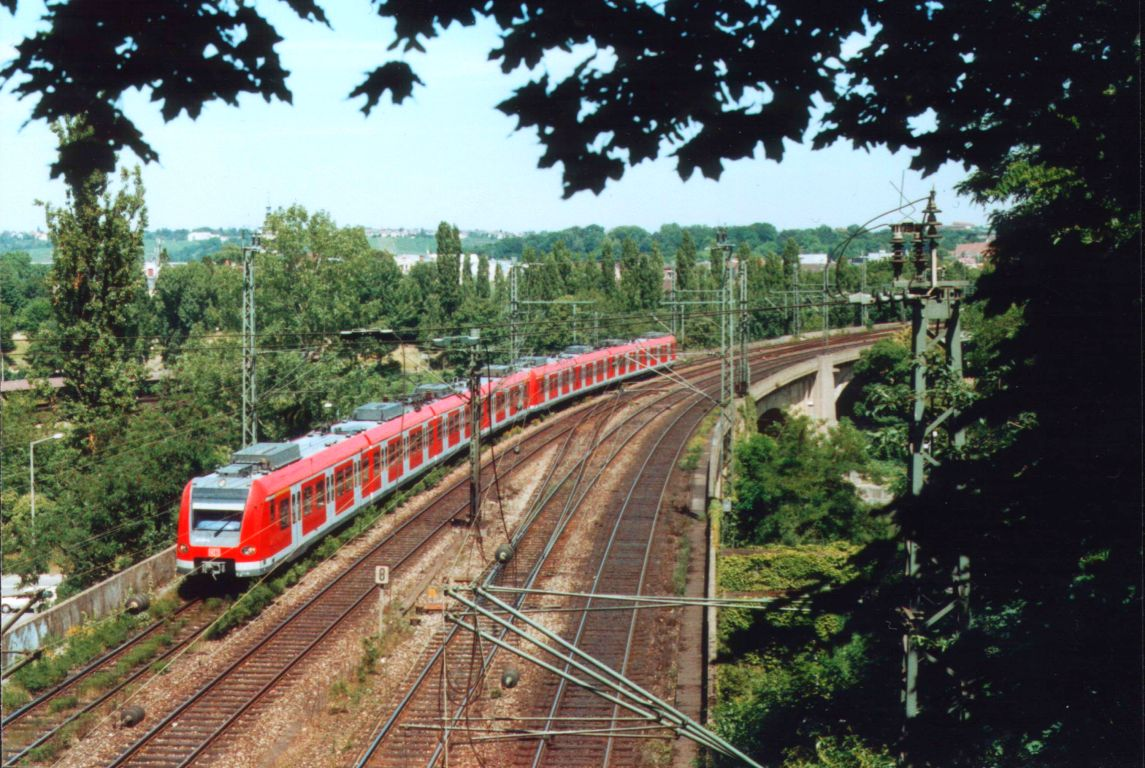
S-Bahn in Bad Cannstatt on the Rosenstein Bridge

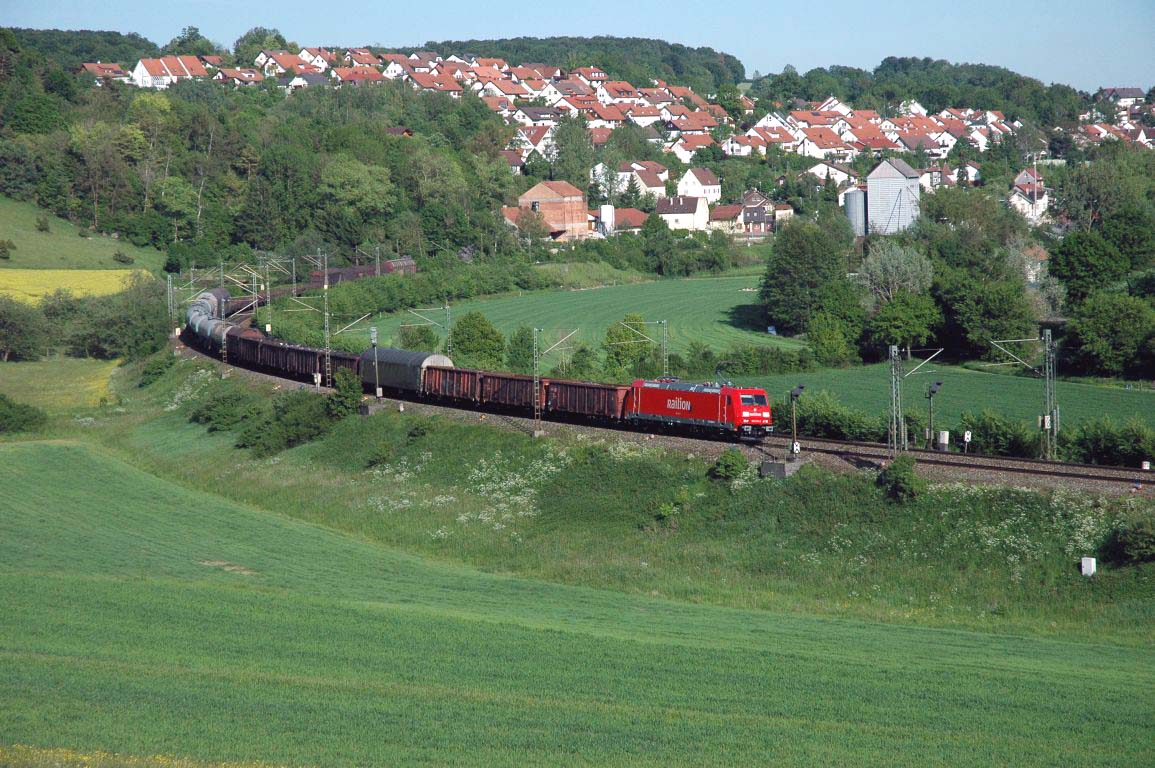
Freight train running to Stuttgart near Lonsee

All kinds of services run on the Fils Valley Railway. While the Stuttgart-Plochingen section is integrated into the Stuttgart S-Bahn network, Regionalbahn services run on the eastern sections of the line. These run from Plochingen to Geislingen and Geislingen to Ulm, usually once an hour, utilizing Class 425 or Class 426 electric multiple units or Class 110/Class 143 locomotives hauling Silberling carriages.

RegionalExpress (RE) trains run hourly between Stuttgart and Neu-Ulm (some continuing to Donauwörth), with additional hourly RE trains between Stuttgart Plochingen and Tübingen. They are operated by double decker carriages hauled by Class 146.2 locomotives. Some RE trains from Ulm continue through Stuttgart on the Franconia Railway to Mosbach-Neckarelz.

InterRegioExpress Sprinter services operate between Stuttgart and Lindau, hauled by Class 146.2 locomotives to Ulm, or by two Class 218 diesel locomotives in order to pass the Geislinger Steige without a substantial loss of speed.

ICEs usually run over the Filsbahn on an hourly basis, without stopping. IC or EC trains generally also run hourly, stopping in Plochingen and Göppingen, and occasionally also in Geislingen an der Steige. From the winter timetable change of 9 December 2007, EC services will be replaced by French TGV POS services between Paris and Munich.

Several times per hour, sometimes heavy freight trains traverse the Fils Valley Railway, mostly consisting of mixed freight cars. Every so often, single-commodity trains (Ganzzüge) utilize the line.

=== Route ===
Beginning in Esslingen am Neckar, the line, running alongside the Neckar, climbs gently but steadily until arriving in Plochingen; by the time it reaches Süßen (384 metres above sea level) it has climbed 120 metres. From Süßen to Geislingen it climbs continuously another 100 m. Emerging out of the Fils Valley, the route makes a large curve around Geislingen (469 metres above sea level). During the 112 metres climb up the Geislinger Steige, there is a monument on the left to Michael Knoll, the designer of the entire line between Esslingen and Ulm. The summit is reached at Amstetten, at 582 m above sea level. The line reaches Ulm after running through the thinly settled Alb highlands.

=== Modernisation ===
Since mid-2004, large parts of the Fils Valley Railway had been undergoing modernization activities. Tracks, points, ballast, and sleepers, which had consisted of oak beams soaked in mineral tar oil, and were over 40 years old, were replaced. Starting in 2005 in Stuttgart, going in the direction of Göppingen, the old signals of type Hp were being replaced piece by piece by new Ks-type signals, which were taken into service with the opening of a new automated electronic railway control center in Plochingen.

The larger stations were outfitted with typical DB-style LCD departure information screens, which inform passengers of delays, cancellations, and other information. In Westerstetten, the old platforms by the station, which were located northwest and outside of the town, were replaced by a new halt in the center of the town, which was opened for service in August 2005.

In the Easter holiday of 2006, the old railway control centers at Esslingen, Plochingen, Ebersbach, and Uhingen were closed, and the new automated center in Plochingen was opened. This centralized the electronic train traffic control system between Untertürkheim and Göppingen, as well as on the Neckar-Alb Railway section from Wendlingen to Karlsruhe, which is where the central railway traffic control center for the southwest of Germany is located. Only one person, located there in case of emergency, remains in Plochingen. With the placement of 480 signals, the modernization of 160 switch operating units, and the earth-moving work necessary to lay the required cabling, the cost of this project was 80 million Euros.

== See also ==
- History of the railway in Württemberg
