= Geislingen (electoral district) =

State electoral district of Germany

11: Geislingen
- Electoral district for the Landtag of Baden-Württemberg
- Geislingen in 2026
- District: Göppingen
- Electorate: 89,391 (2026)
- Major settlements: Aichelberg, Albershausen, Bad Ditzenbach, Bad Überkingen, Böhmenkirch, Bad Boll, Deggingen, Donzdorf, Drackenstein, Dürnau, Eschenbach, Gammelshausen, Geislingen an der Steige, Gingen an der Fils, Gruibingen, Hattenhofen, Heiningen, Hohenstadt, Kuchen, Lauterstein, Mühlhausen im Täle, Ottenbach, Salach, Schlat, Süßen, Wiesensteig, and Zell unter Aichelberg

Current electoral district
- Party: CDU
- Member: Nicole Razavi

Geislingen is an electoral constituency (German: Wahlkreis) represented in the Landtag of Baden-Württemberg. Since 2026, it has elected one member via first-past-the-post voting. Voters cast a second vote under which additional seats are allocated proportionally state-wide. Under the constituency numbering system, it is designated as constituency 11. It is wholly within the district of Göppingen.

== Geography ==
The constituency includes the municipalities of Aichelberg, Albershausen, Bad Ditzenbach, Bad Überkingen, Böhmenkirch, Bad Boll, Deggingen, Donzdorf, Drackenstein, Dürnau, Eschenbach, Gammelshausen, Geislingen an der Steige, Gingen an der Fils, Gruibingen, Hattenhofen, Heiningen, Hohenstadt, Kuchen, Lauterstein, Mühlhausen im Täle, Ottenbach, Salach, Schlat, Süßen, Wiesensteig, and Zell unter Aichelberg, within the district of Göppingen.

There were 89,391 eligible voters in 2026.

== Members ==
=== First mandate ===
Both prior to and since the electoral reforms for the 2026 election, the winner of the plurality of the vote (first-past-the-post) in every constituency won the first mandate.

Election	Member	Party	%
1976	Anton Ilg	CDU	
1980	Hermann Seimetz	CDU	
1984	Hermann Seimetz	CDU	
1988	Hermann Seimetz	CDU	
1992	Hermann Seimetz	CDU	
1996	Hermann Seimetz	CDU	
2001	Hermann Seimetz	CDU	
2006	Nicole Razavi	CDU	46.2
2011	Nicole Razavi	CDU	41.4
2016	Nicole Razavi	CDU	28.2
2021	Nicole Razavi	CDU	27.9
2026	Nicole Razavi	CDU	40.9

=== Second mandate ===
Prior to the electoral reforms for the 2026 election, the seats in the state parliament were allocated proportionately amongst parties which received more than 5% of valid votes across the state. The seats that were won proportionally for parties that did not win as many first mandates as seats they were entitled to, were allocated to their candidates which received the highest proportion of the vote in their respective constituencies. This meant that following some elections, a constituency would have one or more members elected under a second mandate.

Prior to 2011, these second mandates were allocated to the party candidates who got the greatest number of votes, whilst from 2011-2021, these were allocated according to percentage share of the vote.

This constituency did not return a second mandate member prior to the 2011 election.

Election	Member	Party
2011	Sascha Binder	SPD
2016	Sascha Binder	SPD
2021	Sascha Binder	SPD

== Election results ==
=== 2026 election ===
State election (2026): Geislingen
Notes:	Blue background denotes the winner of the electorate vote. Pink background denotes a candidate elected from their party list. Yellow background denotes an electorate win by a list member, or other incumbent. A ✓ or ✗ denotes status of any incumbent, win or lose respectively.						
Party	Candidate	Votes	%	±%	Party votes	%	±%
CDU	✓ Nicole Razavi	25,565	41.0	▲13.1	21,728	34.7	▲6.8
AfD	Uwe Freiherr von Wangenheim	13,451	21.6	▲10.0	13,628	21.7	▲10.2
Greens	Julian Beier	10,844	17.4	▼10.1	15,662	25.0	▼2.5
SPD	Sascha Binder	7,498	12.0	▼2.1	3,697	5.9	▼8.5
FDP	Jennifer Röcker	2,692	4.3	▼6.0	2,513	4.0	▼6.3
Left	Bernd Graßhof	2,009	3.2	▲0.9	1,627	2.6	▲0.3
FW					1,173	1.9	▼0.6
BSW					776	1.2	
APT					475	0.8	
dieBasis					244	0.4	
Volt					234	0.4	▼0.1
PARTEI					225	0.5	
Values	Alexander Hildebrandt	321	0.5		207	0.3	
Pensioners					114	0.2	
Team Todenhöfer					101	0.2	
Bündnis C					86	0.1	
ÖDP					78	0.1	▼0.5
Verjüngungsforschung					38	0.1	
PdF					32	0.1	
Humanists					22	0.0	
KlimalisteBW					14	0.0	▼0.7
Informal votes		667			373		
Total valid votes		62,380			62,674		
Turnout		63,047	70.5	▲4.9			
CDU hold	Majority	12,114	19.4	▲19.0			

=== 2021 election ===
State election (2026): Geislingen
Party	Candidate	Votes	%	±%
CDU	Nicole Razavi	16,073	27.9	▼0.3
Greens	Kathinka Kaden	15,829	27.5	▼0.3
SPD	Sascha Binder	8,298	14.4	▼0.9
AfD	Uwe von Wagenheim	6,649	11.5	▼4.5
FDP	Hans-Peter Semmler	5,936	10.3	▲2.7
FW	Erkan Erdem	1,399	2.4	
Left	Eva-Maria Glathe-Braun	1,322	2.3	▲0.5
WiR2020	Sylvia Müller	981	1.7	
KlimalisteBW	Daniel Wagner	444	0.8	
ÖDP	Manfred Freiherr von Campenhausen	374	0.6	▼0.2
Volt	Pia Großler	268	0.5	
Majority		244	0.4	
Rejected ballots		466	0.8	▼0.4
Turnout		58,039	65.6	▼7.0
Registered electors		88,430		
CDU hold		Swing		

== See also ==
- Politics of Baden-Württemberg
- Landtag of Baden-Württemberg
