= Fuchseck =

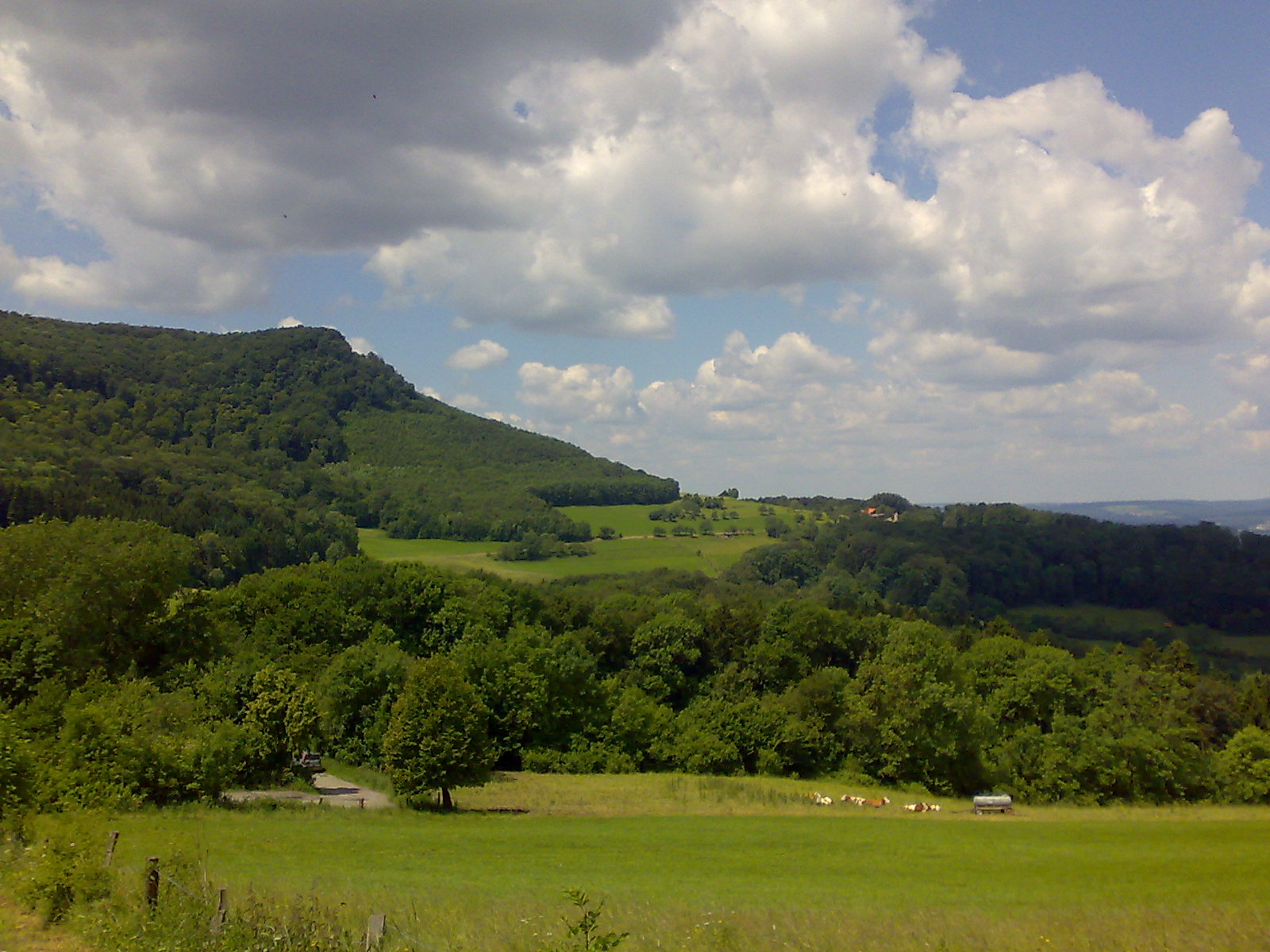

Highest point
- Elevation: 762 m (2,500 ft)
- Coordinates: 48°38′15″N 9°41′12″E

Geography
- Location within Baden-Württemberg
- Location: Baden-Württemberg, Germany
- Parent range: Swabian Alb

The Fuchseck is a 762m high mountain on the northern edge of the Swabian Alb in Baden-Württemberg, Germany.

The mountain is surrounded by the towns of Gammelshausen, Eschenbach, Schlat and Bad Ditzenbach. The summit is on the municipal border of Schlat in the Göppingen District. The mountain is popular for its hiking and mountain biking opportunities.

Nearby mountains include the Wasserberg and Sielenwang.
