= Hattenhofen, Baden-Württemberg =

Hattenhofen
- Municipality
- Coat of arms

- Location of Hattenhofen within Göppingen district
- Interactive map of Hattenhofen
- Location within Germany Location within Baden-Württemberg
- Coordinates: 48°40′0″N 9°34′19″E
- Country: Germany
- State: Baden-Württemberg
- Admin. region: Stuttgart
- District: Göppingen

Government
  - Mayor (2019–27): Jochen Reutter

Area
  - Total: 7.64 km^{2} (2.95 sq mi)
- Elevation: 366 m (1,201 ft)

Population (2025-12-31)
  - Total: 2,934
  - Density: 384/km^{2} (995/sq mi)
- Time zone: UTC+01:00 (CET)
  - Summer (DST): UTC+02:00 (CEST)
- Postal codes: 73110
- Dialling codes: 07164
- Vehicle registration: GP
- Website: www.hattenhofen.de

Hattenhofen (German pronunciation: [hatn̩ˈhoːfn̩]) is a municipality in the district of Göppingen in Baden-Württemberg in southern Germany.

== Geographical location ==
Hattenhofen is located between Stuttgart and Ulm in the foothills of the Swabian Jura. The place is surrounded by numerous orchards.

== Geology ==
The community is located on the Black Jurassic a fossil-rich layer of Posidonia shale, and is part of the in 1979 established excavation reserve fossils of Holzmaden.

== Neighbouring ==
Neighboring towns are Albershausen, Sparwiesen (district of Uhingen) Bezgenriet (District of Göppingen), Zell unter Aichelberg, Schlierbach and Ohmden. Ohmden belongs to district Esslingen, all others to district Göppingen.

== Municipality arrangement ==
The municipality Hattenhofen includes the village Hattenhofen and the homestead Riedenhof as well as proofs of a former castle.

== History ==
The first mention of the place was in 1275 in Liber decimationis, the tenth book of the Bishopric of Constance. Together with the county of Aichelberg Hattenhofen came from 1334 to 1339 to Württemberg. Until 1365 the place was pledged to the Lords of Lichtenstein. After temporary membership to the Oberamt Kirchheim Hattenhofen came in 1485 to the Oberamt Göppingen. The Thirty Years' War and the plague also demanded in Hattenhofen their toll. Formerly of 600 inhabitants have survived to 1637 only 20. In 1938 the municipality was integrated to the Göppingen district. Together with the municipalities Aichelberg, Bad Boll, Dürnau and Gammelshausen the place forms since 1970, the municipality administration unit of the area Bad Boll.

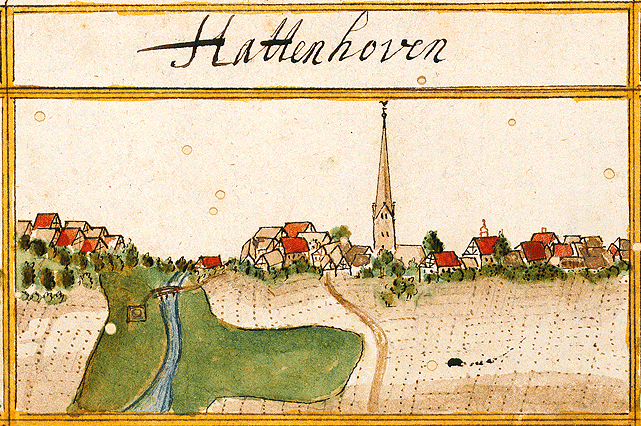

Hattenhofen in the year 1683

== Population Development ==
- Year Population
- 1837 1,004
- 1907 971
- 1939 879
- 1950 1,373
- 1970 1,714
- 1983 2,671
- 2005 3,004
- 2010 2,933

== Religions ==
Since the Reformation Hattenhofen is Protestant coined. Even today live predominantly Protestant Christians here. There is also a Roman Catholic and a New Apostolic congregation.

== Council ==
The local elections on 25 May 2014 resulted in the following distribution of seats:

- CDU 61.2% + 10.6% 7 seats (+1)
- citizens community (Bürgergemeinschaft) 38.8% - 10.6% 5 seats (-1)

== Crest ==
The blazon of the municipal coat of arms of Hattenhofen is: In red on green hill between two golden deciduous trees a silver house with pointed silver tile roof, closed door and two windows. The community led since 1916 an official seal with a coat of arms on which a silver Obereck, and a tree was displayed next to a house. The now distant Obereck stood for the counts of Aichelberg. House and tree stand for the word Hof, which puts in place names. It is therefore a so-called partly self-explaining crest. The coat of arms in its current form was officially awarded on 15 August 1959 by the Ministry of Interior. The local colors are white and red.

== Notable people ==
- Georg Gallus (1927–2021), farmer, German politician FDP, Secretary of State at the Ministry of agriculture and forestry in Bonn
- Georg Jauss (1867–1922), landscape, portrait and genre painter *
- Emanuel Christoph Klüpfel (1712–1799) founder of Almanach de Gotha

From Hattenhofen also came the great-grandfather of the poet Ludwig Uhland and the grandmother of the poet Friedrich Hölderlin.
