= Pliensbach =

Hamlet in Baden-Württemberg, Germany

- Hamlet
- Location within Baden-Württemberg Location within Germany
- Coordinates: 48°39′08″N 9°35′09″E
- Country: Germany
- State: Baden-Württemberg
- District: Göppingen
- Municipality: Zell unter Aichelberg

Pliensbach is a hamlet in the municipality of Zell unter Aichelberg in the district of Göppingen in central Baden-Württemberg.

== History ==
In 1452, Pliensbach came under the possession of Württemberg. In September 1519, during the conflicts between Duke Ulrich and the Swabian League, 14 buildings in Pliensbach were devastated. In 1628, the plague reached Pliensbach as well as the entire Zeller district, resulting in a total of 200 deaths in the villages of Zell, Pliensbach, Aichelberg, and Eckwälden.

== Geography ==
Pliensbach is located in the central Alb foothills between the Albtrauf to the south and the lower course of the Fils river to the north, approximately half a kilometre east of the edge of Zell. It sits on the left bank of the main branch of the Butzbach, known locally as the Pliensbach, which drains northward into the Fils river, and after which the town is named. The village is situated at an elevation of around 375 metres above sea level.

Pliensbach has about 130 inhabitants and has been politically associated with Zell unter Aichelberg since the formation of the Zeller district approximately 500 years ago

== Geology ==
The town has lent its name to a chronostratigraphic stage of the Jurassic period, known as the Pliensbachian. The earliest mentions of paleontological discoveries in the area date back to 1565 by Conrad Gesner and 1602 by Johannes Bauhinus.
