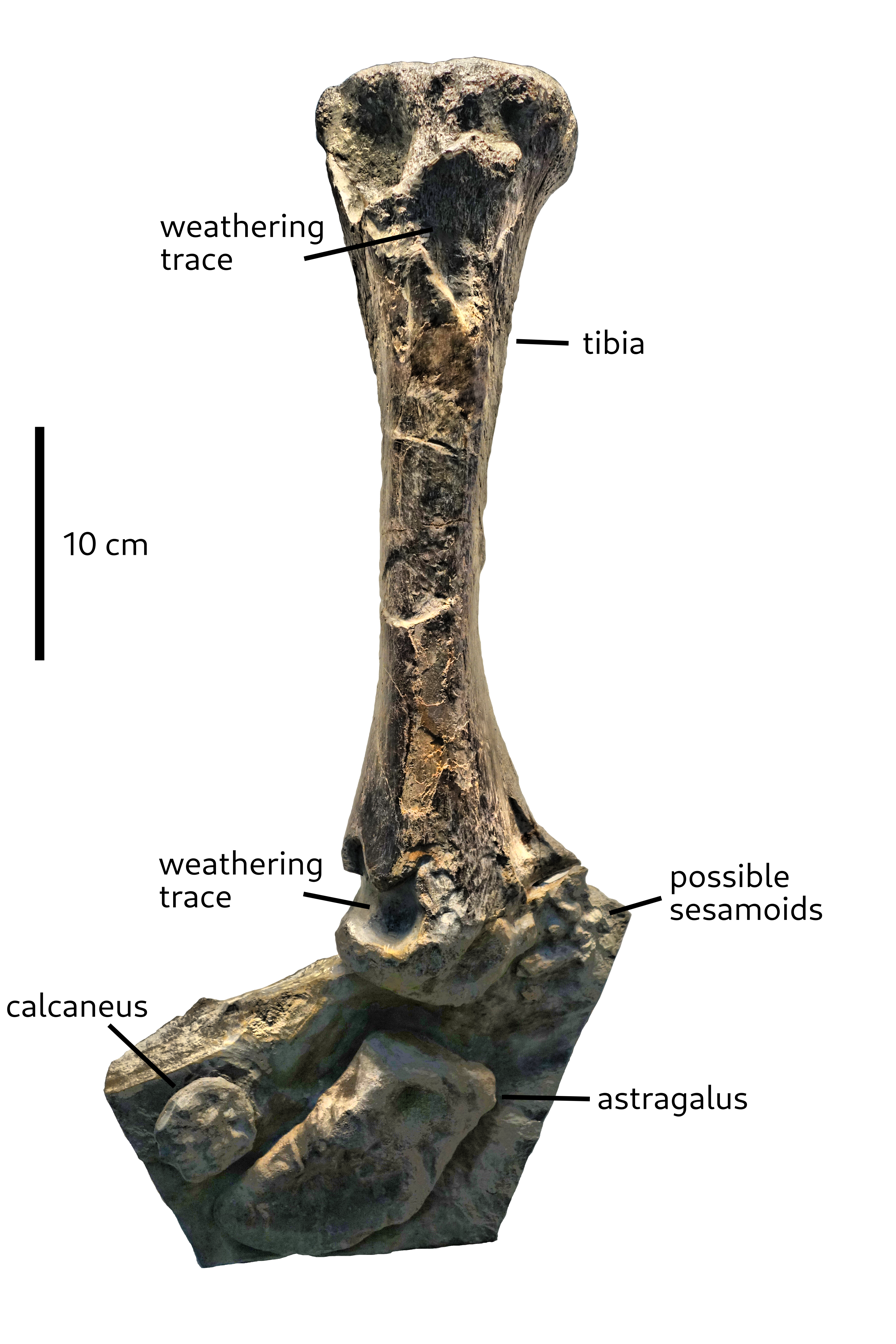
- The only known specimen (bones of the lower leg) in posterior (rear) view, on exhibit at the Urweltmuseum Hauff, Germany

Scientific classification
- Kingdom: Animalia
- Phylum: Chordata
- Class: Reptilia
- Clade: Dinosauria
- Clade: Saurischia
- Clade: †Sauropodomorpha
- Clade: †Sauropoda
- Genus: †Ohmdenosaurus; Wild, 1978
- Species: †O. liasicus

Binomial name
- †Ohmdenosaurus liasicus Wild, 1978

= Ohmdenosaurus =

Ohmdenosaurus Temporal range: early Toarcian, 182 Ma

Extinct species of reptile

Ohmdenosaurus ('Ohmden lizard') is a genus of sauropod dinosaur that lived during the Early Jurassic epoch in what is now Germany. The only specimen – a tibia (shinbone) and ankle – was discovered in rocks of the Posidonia Shale near the village of Ohmden. The specimen, which was originally identified as a plesiosaur, is exhibited in a local museum, the Urweltmuseum Hauff. In the 1970s, it caught the attention of German palaeontologist Rupert Wild, who recognised it as the remains of a sauropod. Wild named Ohmdenosaurus in a 1978 publication; the only known species is Ohmdenosaurus liasicus.

One of the earliest known sauropods, Ohmdenosaurus was quadrupedal (four-legged) and already had the columnar limbs typical for the group. It was small for a sauropod, with an estimated length of 3–4 m (10–13 ft). Its relationships to other sauropods remain uncertain due to the incompleteness of its remains, though one study concluded it was a eusauropod. The Posidonia Shale was deposited within a shallow inland sea and contains abundant and well-preserved fossils of marine reptiles, including ichthyosaurs and plesiosaurs. Ohmdenosaurus was a terrestrial animal, and the specimen must have been transported by predators or water currents at least 100 km (60 mi) from the shoreline to its site of burial. It is the only dinosaur fossil known from the shale.

== History of discovery ==
Map showing the location of the municipality of Ohmden, where the fossil was found, within the district of Esslingen and the state of Baden-Württemberg in southwestern Germany

The Posidonia Shale at Holzmaden in southwestern Germany is one of the world's major fossil Lagerstätten (fossil deposit of exceptional importance). Deposited within an inland sea, it contains abundant fossils of marine reptiles such as ichthyosaurs, plesiosaurs, and crocodyliforms, sometimes with soft tissue preservation. This organic-rich shale has been quarried for more than 400 years, first for roofing and paving, and later to also extract oil. Its exceptionally preserved fossils were made famous by Bernhard Hauff, who started to collect and prepare specimens found in a quarry owned by his father. In 1892, Hauff presented an ichthyosaur specimen that preserves the original body outline, revealing that ichthyosaurs possessed dorsal fins. Together with his son, he opened a local museum in Holzmaden in 1936/37, the Urweltmuseum Hauff, to display the finds.

In the 1970s, German palaeontologist Rupert Wild was visiting the Urweltmuseum Hauff when he noticed a fossil in a display labelled as the humerus (upper arm bone) of a plesiosaur. Wild recognised the specimen as a dinosaur fossil, borrowed the specimen for study and carried out further preparation. The fossil, which has no specimen number, consists of a right tibia (shinbone) together with the astragalus and calcaneus (the upper bones of the ankle). It had long been part of the museum's collection, having been collected from one of the early quarries near the village of Ohmden that were later refilled; the exact discovery site is unknown. In a 1978 publication, Wild determined that the dinosaur fossil belonged to a new genus and species, which he named Ohmdenosaurus liasicus. The generic name Ohmdenosaurus is derived from the village of Ohmden and from the Ancient Greek σαῦρος (sauros), meaning lizard or reptile. The specific name liasicus refers to the Lias, an old name for the Lower Jurassic of Europe.

A chunk of rock – a gray-black, finely laminated slate containing small fragments of fish fossils – is still attached to the lower end of the fossil. This rock indicates that the fossil was found in the Unterer Schiefer ('lower slate'), the oldest part of the Posidonia Shale. It is therefore early Toarcian in age (ca. 182 million years ago). When Ohmdenosaurus was described in 1978, it was one of the earliest sauropods known at the time and only the second fossil of a terrestrial saurian to be discovered from the Toarcian. Between the tibia and astragalus, the specimen also preserves a limestone geode that is rich in the mineral pyrite and contains fossils of the snail Coelodiscus.

== Description ==
Like all sauropods, Ohmdenosaurus was a quadrupedal (four-legged) herbivore with a long neck and tail. Wild estimated the total body length at 3–4 m (10–13 ft), which is relatively small for a sauropod.

The tibia is 405 mm (15.9 in) long. The bone preserves projections that served as attachment sites for muscles, including the cnemial crest, which projects by about 4 cm (1.6 in) from the upper front of the bone, and the crista lateralis, which runs for about 13 cm (5.1 in) down the upper half of the shaft but is mostly broken off. The upper end of the tibia is oval in shape when viewed from above, with a width-to-length ratio of 1.4. The lower end of the tibia is rotated by 90° relative to the upper end. The lower end of the tibia is formed by two rounded, well-separated prominences, the medial (inner) and lateral (outer) condyles. The medial condyle is much larger than the (broken) lateral condyle and located c. 2–3 cm (0.8–1.2 in) lower than the latter.

The astragalus is 140 mm (5.5 in) in diameter, sandal-shaped, and rotated by 90° out of its original position, exposing its upper surface. This surface has two concavities, a larger medial and a smaller lateral one; the latter was located about 2 cm (0.8 in) higher than the former. These concavities received the medial and lateral condyles of the tibia, respectively. A furrow between these concavities is thought to have been an attachment site for ligaments of the ankle. The much smaller calcaneus is 43 mm (1.7 in) in diameter and 15 mm (0.6 in) in maximal height, and circular in shape. Its probable lower surface is convex, and its probable upper surface is roughly textured, indicating the presence of a cartilaginous covering. Below the lateral condyle of the tibia, Wild noted several other small elements 5–30 mm (0.2–1.2 in) in size, which he identified as cartilage given their grainy and irregular surfaces. Unlike bone, cartilage is rarely preserved in fossils, and in this case might have been preserved thanks to the absorption of calcium salts. As these elements are located close to the attachment site of the Achilles tendon, the area of the ankle that experienced the highest stresses in life, Wild argued that they may represent sesamoids (small structures embedded within tendons). Alternatively, they could be calcified pieces of the cartilage of the astragalus.

== Classification ==
Saurischian ('reptile hipped') dinosaurs are subdivided into two major groups – the herbivorous sauropodomorphs and the mostly carnivorous theropods. Sauropodomorpha consists of the quadrupedal sauropods, which were characterized by straight, columnar limbs, as well as of several early and basal (early-diverging) forms that were mostly bipedal and had the limb bones angled against each other. Wild, in his 1978 description, argued that the Early Jurassic Ohmdenosaurus must have been a sauropod because its limb was clearly columnar: The tibia is more massive than seen in basal sauropodomorphs, and its upper joint surface is perpendicular to the long axis of the bone, demonstrating that the limb was straight when standing. Furthermore, the astragalus lacks the ascending process (upwards directed bony projection) that is typical for the bipedal forms, but strongly reduced or absent in sauropods due to differences in weight distribution as a consequence of their columnar limbs. On the other hand, Wild noted several basal features typical of basal sauropodomorphs but absent in other sauropods, including the sandal shape of the astragalus and the stepped configuration of the lower articular surface of the tibia. The oval shape of the upper end of the tibia was intermediate between the circular shape seen in the basal sauropodomorph Plateosaurus and the strongly elliptical shape seen in later sauropods such as Cetiosaurus. Wild concluded that Ohmdenosaurus shows a mosaic of primitive and derived features and probably needs to be placed in a new family of sauropods.

Other basal sauropods have been described since, but relationships to these forms remain vague given the incompleteness of the Ohmdenosaurus specimen. In 1990, John Stanton McIntosh tentatively included Ohmdenosaurus in the Vulcanodontidae, noting that the tibia is very similar to that of the name-giving genus of the family, Vulcanodon. Later, the Vulcanodontidae was demonstrated to be polyphyletic (does not form a natural group) and therefore fell out of use. Jay Nair and colleagues, in 2012, compared Ohmdenosaurus to the Australian genus Rhoetosaurus, noting that the tibiae of both genera are relatively slender as seen in later sauropods, unlike the more robust tibiae of other early genera. As Rhoetosaurus is geologically younger than Ohmdenosaurus, the latter would have been the earliest known sauropod with a slender tibia. The astragalus of Rhoetosaurus was found to be more similar to Ohmdenosaurus than to other sauropods. Sebastian Stumpf and colleagues, in 2015, reported fragmentary sauropod remains from the Toarcian of Grimmen in northeastern Germany, including four elements of the pelvic girdle and part of a vertebra. Although roughly contemporaneous with Ohmdenosaurus, they cannot be directly compared to the latter because they do not include elements of the hind limbs. The Grimmen remains do, however, resemble the early sauropod Tazoudasaurus from Morocco, while Ohmdenosaurus appears to be closer to Rhoetosaurus. Stumpf and colleagues therefore suggested that Ohmdenosaurus and the Grimmen sauropod were not closely related to each other.

In 2020, Oliver Rauhut and colleagues included Ohmdenosaurus in a phylogenetic analysis, but found it to be unstable as it was placed in different positions in the tree by different variants of the analysis, both within and outside of Sauropoda. Michael Simms and colleagues, in 2021, suggested that Ohmdenosaurus might be considered a nomen dubium (dubious name) due to the incompleteness of its remains. In 2022, Omar Regalado Fernández and Ingmar Werneburg included Ohmdenosaurus in a phylogenetic analysis that placed it within Eusauropoda – a group that comprises most sauropods except some very basal forms such as Tazoudasaurus. Within Eusauropoda, Ohmdenosaurus forms a clade with Amygdalodon, Spinophorosaurus, and Volkheimeria in this analysis.

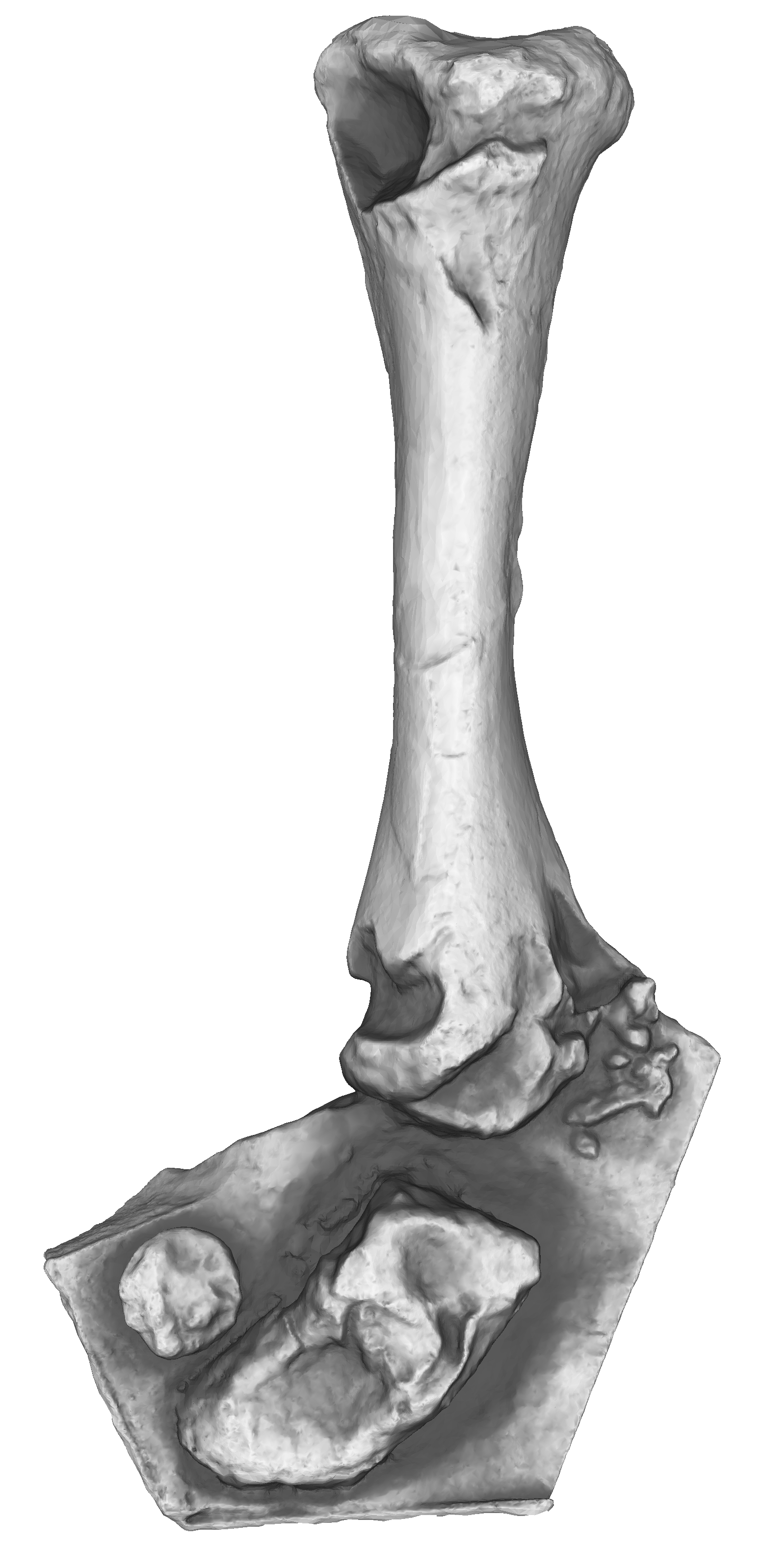
Rendering of a 3D model of the only known specimen

The following cladogram shows the possible relationships of Ohmdenosaurus according to Omar Regalado Fernández and Ingmar Werneburg in 2022:

- - Isanosaurus
  - - Tazoudasaurus
    - - Vulcanodon
      - Eusauropoda
        - Shunosaurus
        - - - - Cetiosaurus
              - - Ohmdenosaurus
                - Amygdalodon
                - Spinophorosaurus
                - Volkheimeria
            - - - - Barapasaurus
                  - Patagosaurus
                - - - Neosauropoda
                    - - Omeisaurus
                      - Mamenchisaurus

== Taphonomy ==
Wild, in his 1978 description, attempted to reconstruct the taphonomy of the specimen – the events between the death and final deposition of the individual. Such reconstructions are important for the understanding of the formation of the Posidonia Shale as a unique fossil deposit. The tibia of Ohmdenosaurus shows two excavations caused by weathering that are 2–5 cm (0.8–2.0 in) deep. These excavations are located on the sidewards projecting upper and lower ends, but only on the medial (inner) side of the bone. This indicates that the bone must have laid on its lateral (outer) side and partly covered by sediment, only exposing the most protruding parts of the other side to the elements. Because similar weathering traces are not seen in other fossils from the Posidonia shale due to the absence of currents near the sea floor, the weathering likely took place while the specimen was still on land or near the shore, perhaps in a river delta.

Based on this evidence, Wild concluded that the specimen must have been transported and deposited twice. First, it was transported from its place of death to the first site of deposition near the coast, where the weathering took place. This transport is indicated by the presumed partial sediment cover, which indicates a site where sedimentation took place. The second transport to its final site of deposition far off the coast could have happened through strong currents near the surface. Wild, however, considered it more likely that scavengers such as crocodiles or plesiosaurs brought the specimen to its final site because of the massiveness of the tibia and the considerable distance to the coast. It was probably only during this second transport that the carcass got separated: the tibia and ankle were still articulated when found, indicating that soft tissue was still in place that held these bones together when the specimen arrived at its final site. The snail Coelodiscus that was found with the specimen could have been a scavenger feeding on the decaying soft tissue.

== Palaeoenvironment ==
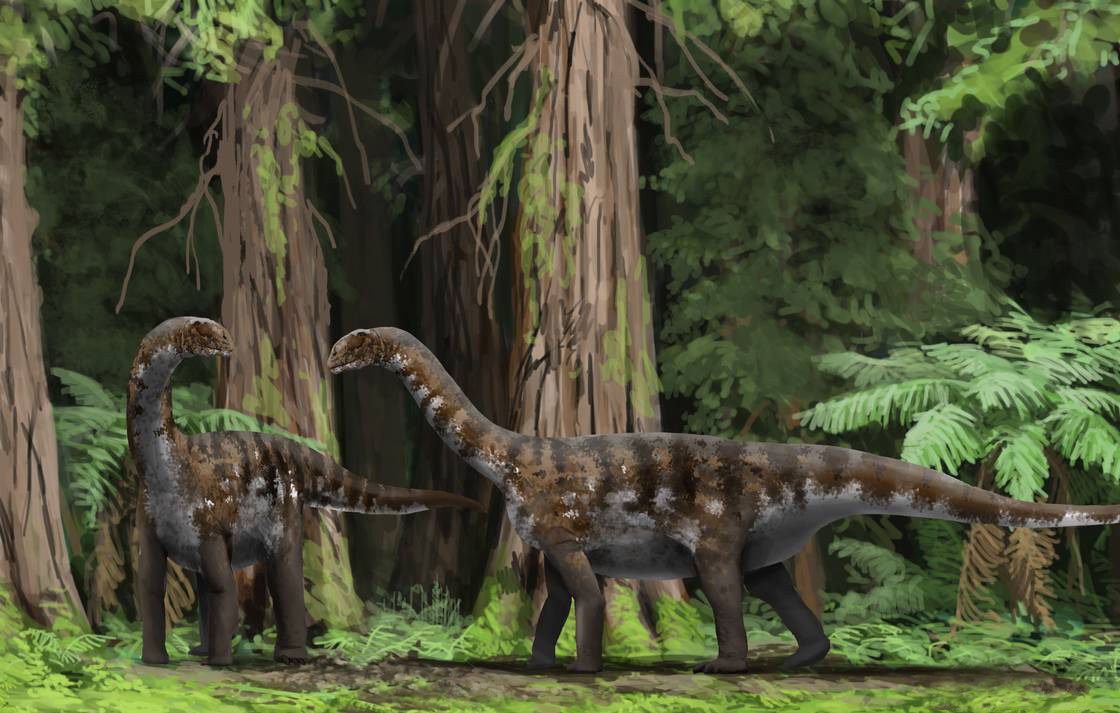
Life restoration of two individuals in their habitat

The Posidonia shale at Holzmaden was deposited in a subtropical inland sea at c. 30°N with a water depth of 100–600 m (300–2,000 ft). The nearest landmass was probably the Black Forest Massif about 100 km (60 mi) to the southwest. Ohmdenosaurus is the only known dinosaur fossil from this formation, and other evidence for terrestrial life in the shale is scarce. Several flying animals are known, including the pterosaurs Dorygnathus and Campylognathoides, and one layer contains abundant remains of dragonflies and net-winged insects. Although driftwood is frequently found, other plant remains are rare and include horsetails, conifers, and the now extinct bennettitales. Since these remains are fragmented and sorted by water action, they provide limited information on the floral composition of their place of origin.
