= Georg Gallus =

German politician (1927–2021)

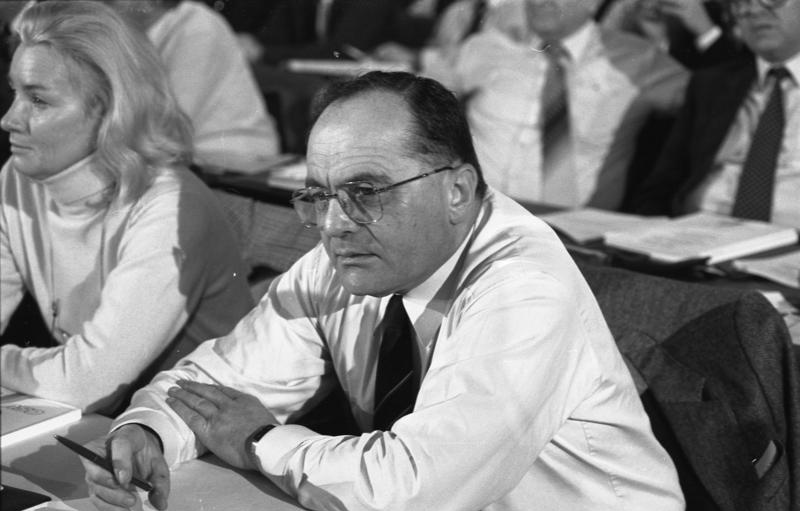
- Gallus in 1987

Member of the Bundestag
- In office 10 December 1970 – 10 November 1994

Personal details
- Born: 6 July 1927 Hattenhofen, Germany
- Died: 13 August 2021 (aged 94) Hattenhofen, Germany
- Party: FDP

Georg Gallus (6 July 1927 – 13 August 2021) was a German politician of the Free Democratic Party (FDP) who served as member of the German Bundestag.

== Life ==
On 10 September 1970, Gallus entered the Bundestag to replace Ralf Dahrendorf, who had resigned. He was then a member of the Bundestag until 1994. He always entered the Bundestag via the Baden-Württemberg state list. On 16 December 1976, Gallus was appointed Parliamentary State Secretary to the Federal Minister of Food, Agriculture and Forestry in the Federal Government headed by Chancellor Helmut Schmidt. Following the break-up of the social-liberal coalition, he initially resigned from office on 17 September 1982.

Following the election of Helmut Kohl as Federal Chancellor, Gallus was reappointed Parliamentary State Secretary to the Federal Minister of Food, Agriculture and Forestry on 4 October 1982. Gallus then left the government on 21 January 1993 at the same time as the previous Federal Minister Ignaz Kiechle.

== Literature ==
Herbst, Ludolf; Jahn, Bruno (2002). Vierhaus, Rudolf (ed.). Biographisches Handbuch der Mitglieder des Deutschen Bundestages. 1949–2002 [Biographical Handbook of the Members of the German Bundestag. 1949–2002] (in German). München: De Gruyter - De Gruyter Saur. p. 1715. ISBN 978-3-11-184511-1.
