= Zell unter Aichelberg =

- Municipality
- Coat of arms

- Location of Zell unter Aichelberg within Göppingen district
- Interactive map of Zell unter Aichelberg
- Location within Germany Location within Baden-Württemberg
- Coordinates: 48°38′59″N 9°34′31″E
- Country: Germany
- State: Baden-Württemberg
- Admin. region: Stuttgart
- District: Göppingen

Government
  - Mayor (2019–27): Christopher Flink

Area
  - Total: 6.39 km^{2} (2.47 sq mi)
- Elevation: 384 m (1,260 ft)

Population (2025-12-31)
  - Total: 3,102
  - Density: 485/km^{2} (1,260/sq mi)
- Time zone: UTC+01:00 (CET)
  - Summer (DST): UTC+02:00 (CEST)
- Postal codes: 73119
- Dialling codes: 07164
- Vehicle registration: GP
- Website: www.zell-u-a.de

Zell unter Aichelberg is a municipality in the district of Göppingen in Baden-Württemberg in southern Germany.

== Geographical location ==
Between Stuttgart and Ulm, on the western edge of the district Göppingen, lies the municipality of Zell unter Aichelberg close to the Swabian Jura surrounded by the still numerous existing orchards.

== Neighboring communities ==
The neighboring municipalities are: Hattenhofen, Göppingen-Bezgenriet, Bad Boll, Aichelberg, Ohmden and Holzmaden. (Number 1-4 district of Göppingen, Holzmaden and Ohmden district of Esslingen)

== Geology ==
Fossils from the Black Jurassic Jura can be seen in the Urweltmuseum in Holzmaden. The community is part of the 1979 excavation formed reserve fossils Holzmaden. North of the partial local Pliensbach flows the eponymous Pliensbach which joins the Butzbach. This flows in Uhingen in the Fils. Other, smaller watercourses, are the Giesbach and the Zellerbach.

The Pliensbachian age of the Early Jurassic is named after the hamlet of Pliensbach in the municipality.

== Municipality arrangement ==
The municipality consists of the village Zell unter Aichelberg, the hamlet Pliensbach and the homestead Erlenwasen.

=== Space division ===
- 639 ha total area
  - 67 ha = 10.5% forest area
  - 397 ha = 62.1% farm land area
  - 6 ha = 1.0% water area
  - 5 ha = 0.8% recreation area
  - 103 ha = 16.1% building area
  - 56 ha = 8.8% transportation area
  - 4 ha = 0.6% other area

According to data from Statistical office Baden-Württemberg, 2014.

== History ==
- 1108: First mention of the place as Castellum Cella (controversial). Other sources mention as first mention the entry map of Cella near Kirchheim in a gift book from 1140 from the Reichenbach Priory (Baden-Württemberg) in the Black Forest.
- 1466 Zell falls to Göppingen and so became temporarily in the possession of the Dukes of Bavaria.
- 1475: Zell belongs to Württemberg again.
- September 1519: In the conflicts between Ulrich, Duke of Württemberg and the Swabian League, the place was heavily affected. Troops of the Swabian League devastated 57 buildings in Zell 57 and 14 in Pliensbach.
- 1628: The plague reaches Zell
- 1810: Reorganization: Zell is allocated to Oberamt Kirchheim.
- July 1878: Separation of Aichelberg
- April 1, 1933: Eckwälden is separated and combined with the municipality Boll.
- 1938: Zell falls to the administrative district Göppingen.
- 2008: Zell celebrates its 900 anniversary.

== Religions ==
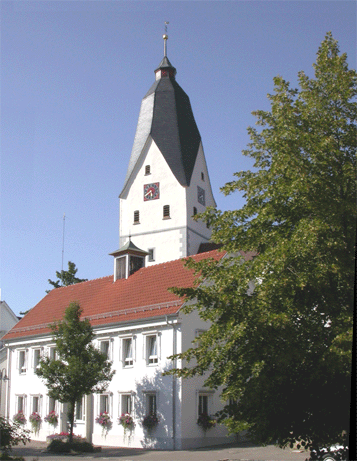
Zell unter Aichelberg Church

Around two-thirds of the population are evangelical, about one third is Catholic.

== Population ==
The population 1837-2010:

- Date Population
- 1837 721
- 1907 970
- May 17, 1939 661
- September 13, 1950 1,007
- May 27, 1970 1,434
- December 31, 1983 2,176
- December 31, 2005 2,973
- December 31, 2010 3,028

== Mayor ==
- 1938–1945: C.E. Hoyler
- 1945–1948: Various Temporary Administrators
- 1948–1955: P. H. Flechtner
- 1955–1987: Gerhard Schwegler
- 1987–2019: Werner Link
- since 2019: Christopher Flink

== Crest ==
The blazon of the municipal coat of arms of Zell unter Aichelberg is: Under golden, with a horizontal black deer rack occupied shield main in red an armored golden left-arm. Emblem and flag were presented on February 19, 1959, by the Stuttgart Ministry of the Interior. The flag colors of the place are yellow-red.

== Partnership ==
Since 1997, there is a partnership with the municipality Friedersdorf from Saxony-Anhalt.

== Economy and infrastructure ==
Facilities such as the community hall, the fire station, the primary and secondary school and the cemetery are centrally located.

=== Transportation ===
To the local road network the municipality is connected by street 1214/1215 and the Kreisstraße 1421. The Autobahn exit Aichelberg at the Bundesautobahn 8 is 3 km from the municipality center.

=== Established businesses ===
The Margarete Ostheimer company manufactures handmade wooden figures and animals that are sold worldwide.

== Education ==
The primary and secondary school Zell unter Aichelberg has around 300 students and 20 teachers.

== Buildings ==
In the center is the Martin church with frescoes dating back to 1400. The namesake of the church is Martin of Tours. The present church is in its original parts from the year 1386. By numerous efforts of the municipality and the population, Zell achieved 1994 the first place in the competition 'Our village is beautiful'. A therefrom arisen Landmark is the Schäferbrunnen located in the town center opposite the town hall.

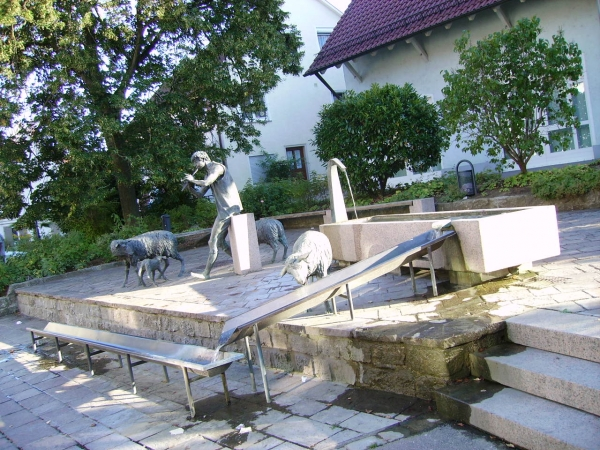
Schäferbrunnen Zell unter Aichelberg (shepherd fountain)

In the town hall there is a permanent exhibition of paintings of the painter Margret Hofheinz-Döring, who lived in Zell from 1974 to 1993.

== Natural monuments ==
Southwest of the municipality is located parallel to the country road L1214 a perry pears trail. The 500 m long path was built in the years 1998 to 2003, and shows various most pear varieties.

== Sports ==
The TSG Zell - founded in 1949 - is the biggest club with about 600 members and includes the departments singing, gymnastics, fistball, chess and football. The table tennis club Zell unter Aichelberg (TTV Zell) has some 180 members.

== Regular events ==
The most important festivals include the Fischerfest held in the Pliensbach district and in July the fountain party. The each November held Remember our Youth Festival, an indoor rock festival with regularly over 600 visitors and performances by international bands and artists.

== People from the town ==
- Leonhard Dürr (died 1538 in Roggenburg), abbot in Adelberg monastery.
- Friedrich Benjamin Osiander (1759-1822), physician, pioneer in the field of surgical obstetrics.

== Personalities who have worked locally ==
- Margret Hofheinz-Döring, (1910-1994), painter and artist, lived from 1974 to 1993 in Zell unter Aichelberg. She was honored in 1990 by planting a lime tree.

== Literature ==
- Theiss, Konrad: Der Kreis Göppingen. Konrad Theiss Verlag, Stuttgart 1978, ISBN 3-8062-0374-1.
- Binder, Adolf: Geschichte und Geschichten aus Zell am Aichelberg. 1985
