= Margret Hofheinz-Döring =

German artist

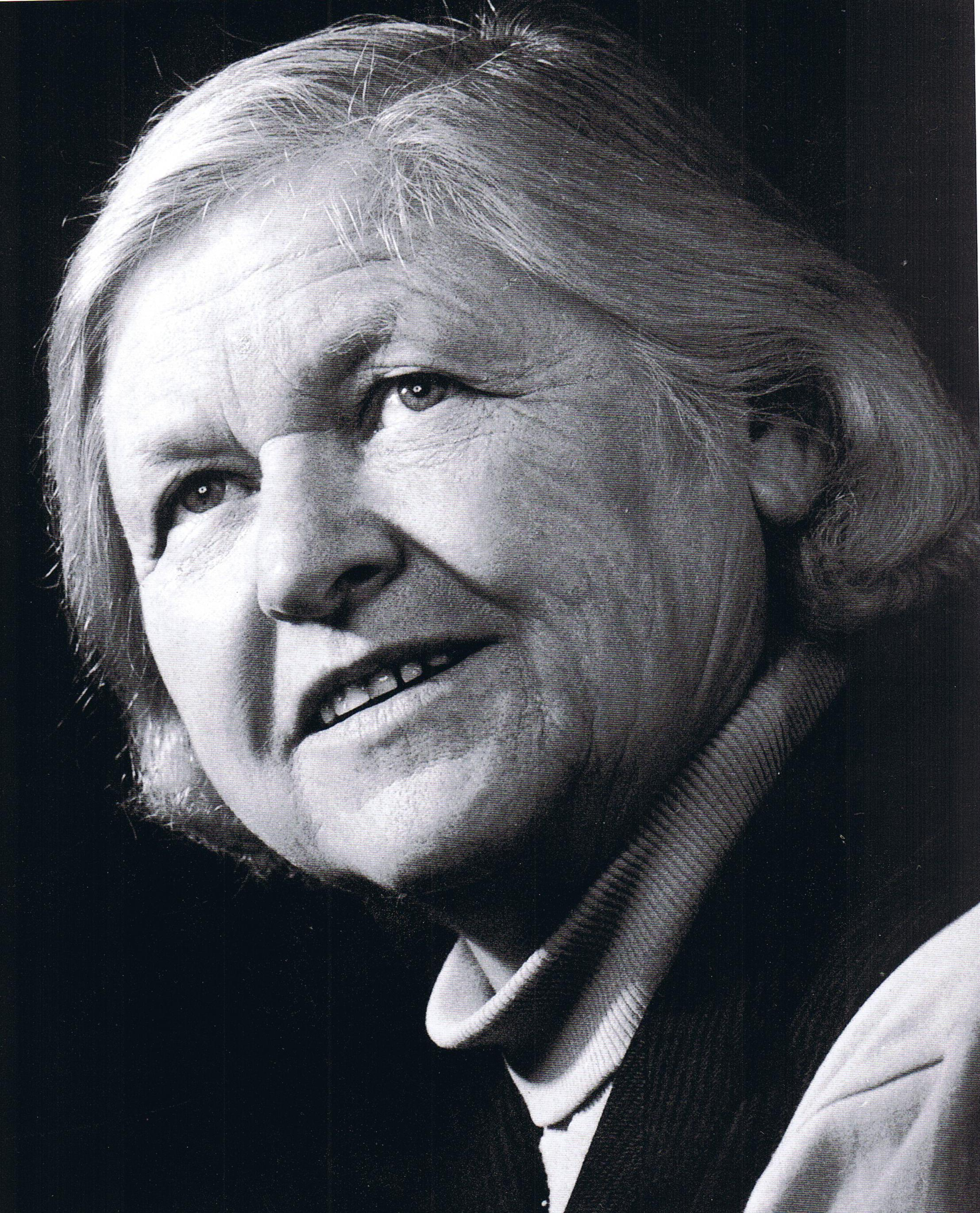
Hofheinz-Döring in 1970

Margret Hofheinz-Döring (20 May 1910 in Mainz – 18 June 1994 in Bad Boll) was a German painter and graphic artist.

She created about 9,000 paintings, images and portraits, presented in more than 100 exhibitions. Her experimental "structure painting", repainting fabric collages and frames, is a notable technique used by Hofheiz-Döring. She earned nationwide renown with different drawing cycles about Goethe's Faust, using various techniques.

== Exhibitions ==
Hofheinz-Dörings first single exhibition was shown 1931 in the Germania-Saal in Göppingen. From 1965 on, her work has been issued at least once a year. The most important exhibitions have taken place in:

Single exhibitions

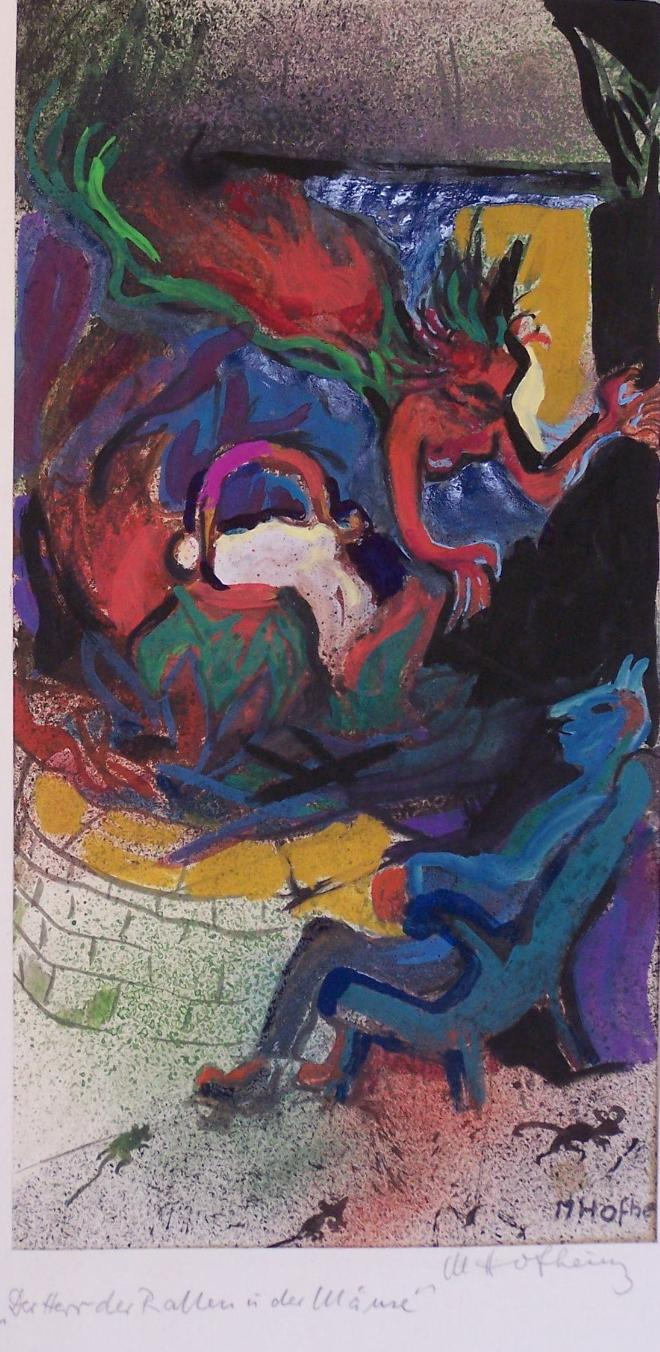
Witch and Mephisto to Faust I (1.Serie), mixed technics, 20x42 cm, 1960 (WV-Nr.1184), by Margret Hofheinz-Döring

- 1969: Ludwigsburg, Galerie Voelter; Zürich, Galerie Kirchgasse; Rothenburg, Rathaus;
- 1970: Göppingen, Stadthalle; Frankfurt, Galerie Goldbach; Erlangen, Siemens-Galerie
- 1972: Sindelfingen, Rathaus; Mainz, Blütenhaus des Stadtparks; Dornach, Goetheanum; Stuttgart, Wilhelmspalais
- 1975: Bad Boll, Evangelische Akademie; Wiesbaden, Galerie Christa Moering; Bückeburg, Galerie Harmening
- 1979: Bonn, Parlamentarische Gesellschaft; Zürich, Bircher-Benner-Klinik
- 1982: Ulm, Künstlergilde
- 1985: Göppingen, Stadthalle; Freudenstadt, Stadthaus
- 1992: Potsdam, Galerie am Neuen Palais
- 1995: Weimar, Galerie Markt 21
- 1997: Bad Berleburg, Museum der Stadt; Zell u. Aichelberg. Gedenk-Raum für Margret Hofheinz-Döring im Rathaus
- 1999: Knittlingen, Faustmuseum / Steinhaus
- 2000: Potsdam, Galerie am Neuen Palais

Participation in larger exhibitions

- 1934: Göppingen
- 1951: Baiersbronn
- ab 1957: Ausstellungen der Freudenstädter Künstlergruppe Quadrat
- 1991: Ehingen, Galerie Schloss Mochental, Künstlerinnen aus Baden-Württemberg
- 1995: Karlsruhe, Städtische Galerie im Prinz-Max-Palais: Frauen im Aufbruch? Künstlerinnen im deutschen Südwesten 1900-1945

Collections

Hofheinz-Dörings work is part of the collections in the Staatsgalerie Stuttgart, the Schiller-Nationalmuseum Marbach, the gallery of Stuttgart, in the city's art museum Spendhaus in Reutlingen, the collection of the Bundesland Baden-Württemberg and the German Bundeskunstsammlung. Some drawings are open to the public, exhibited in the hospital Göppingen, the Werner-Heisenberg-Gymnasium in Göppingen, in the Kurhaus Freudenstadt, the city hall in Zell unter Aichelberg and the retirement home Bad Boll.

== Gallery ==
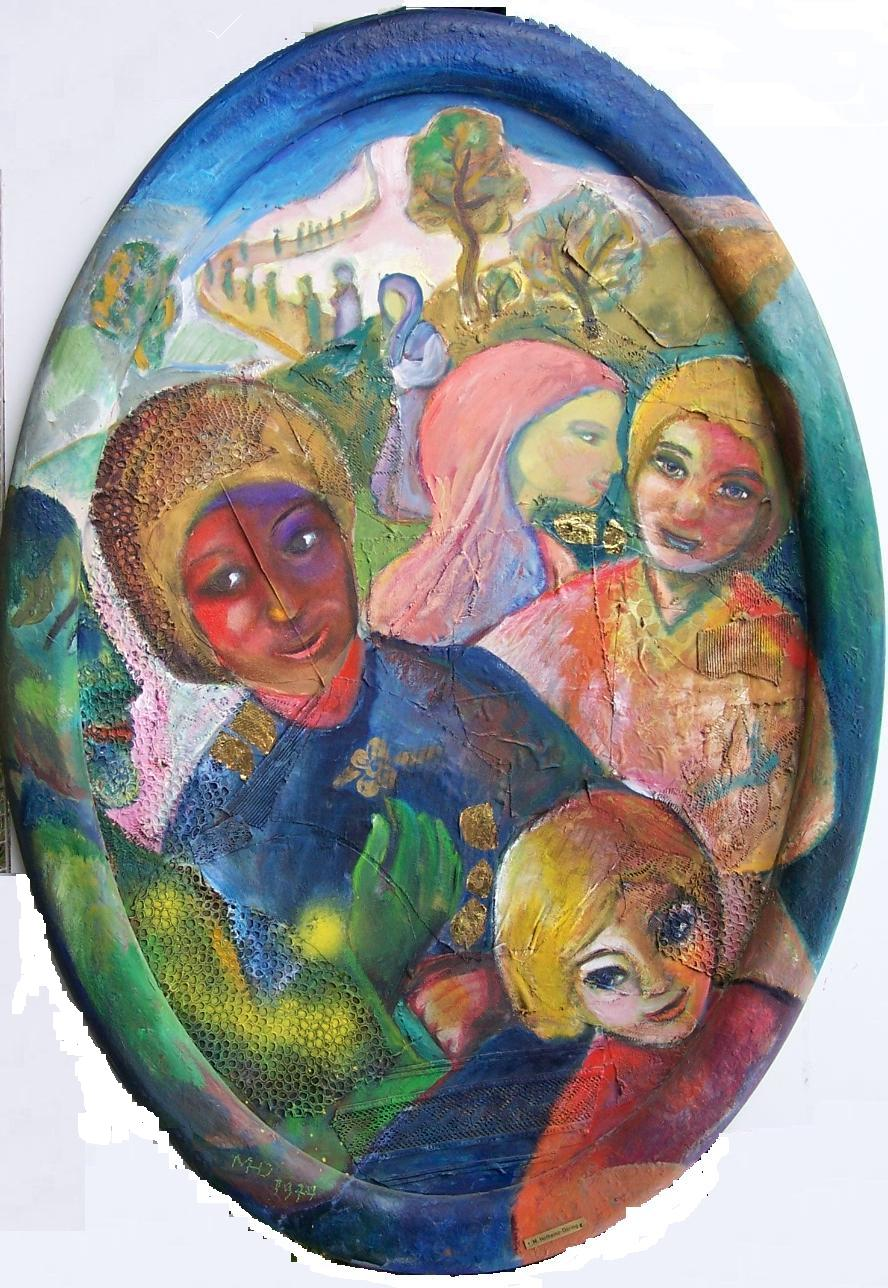
The endless road

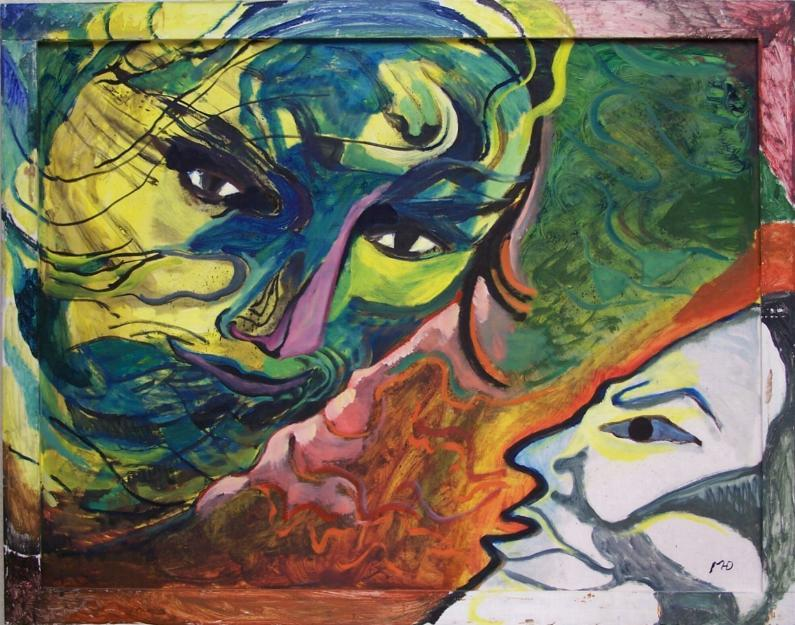
Faust talking with the Erdgeist

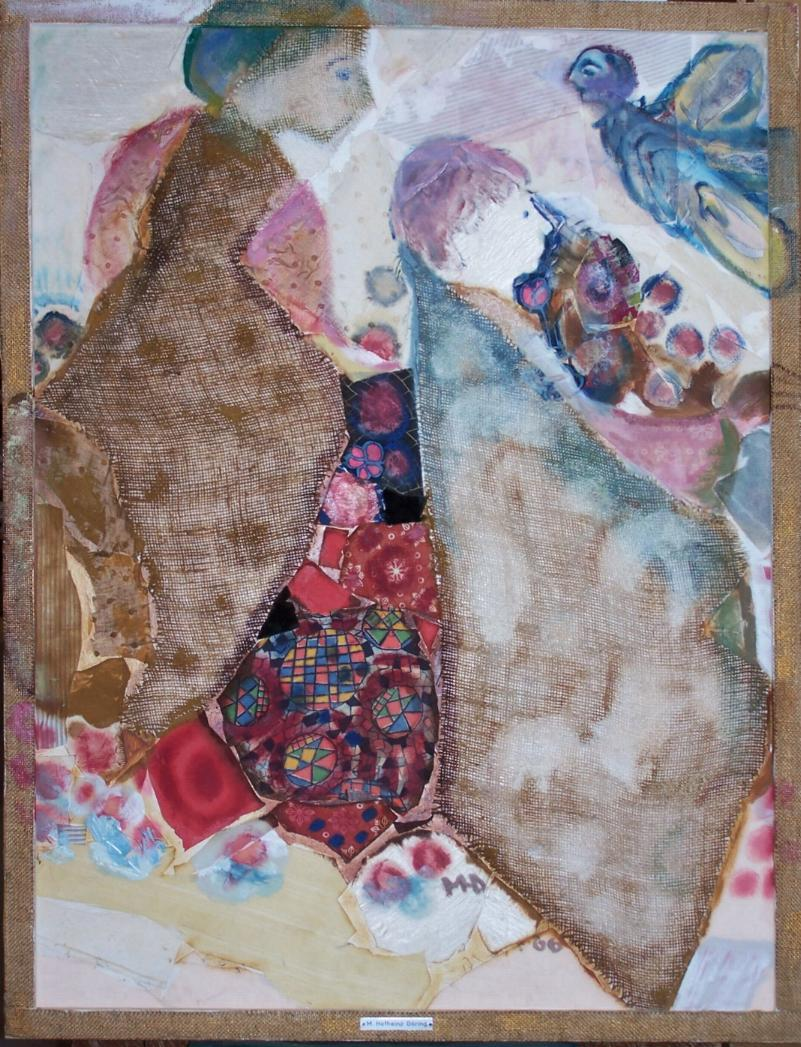
A Midsummer Night's Dream

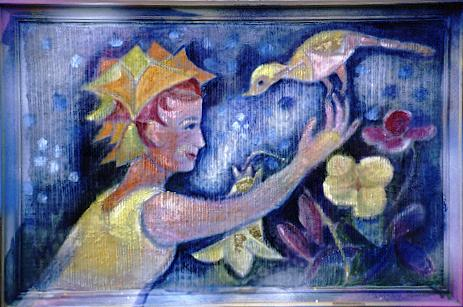
Game in the morning

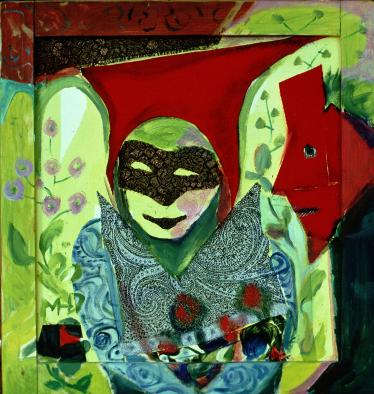
Mask with flowers, 1974

== Sources ==
- Osman Durrani: Faust - Icons of Modern Culture Series, Helm Information Ltd, The Banks, Mountfield, East Sussex, 2004, ISBN 1-903206-15-4
- Sonntagsfahrt ums Filstal, Zeichnungen von Margret Hofheinz-Döring und Texte verschiedener Autoren, Verlag M. Hofheinz-Döring, Zell u. A. 1979
- Margret Hofheinz-Döring, Retrospektive anlässlich einer Ausstellung, Herausgeber: Eislinger Kunstverein 1990, gefördert durch das Ministerium für Wissenschaft und Kunst, Baden-Württemberg.
- Quellen des Friedens, Texte von Buber. Gandhi. Gotthelf - Hesse. Jaspers. King, Bilder von Margret Hofheinz-Döring, Quellen-Verlag Sankt Gallen 1992, Printed in Switzerland. Modèle déposé, BIRPI, Verlag Vaihingen/Enz 1999, ISBN 3-933486-07-6
- Ingrid von der Dollen: Malerinnen im 20. Jahrhundert - Bildkunst der verschollenen Generation, Hirmer Verlag München 2000, ISBN 3-7774-8700-7
- Frauen im Aufbruch - Künstlerinnen im deutschen Südwesten 1800 - 1945, Katalog einer Ausstellung der Städtischen Galerie im Prinz Max Palais Karlsruhe, 1995, ISBN 3-923344-31-7
- Künstlerinnen aus Baden-Württemberg, Katalog zu Ausstellung in der Landesgirokasse, 1992
- Schönes Schwaben, Monatszeitschrift, Dr. Fürst Verlags GmbH, Ausgabe 4/93, S. 6 bis 11
- Künstlerverzeichnis Baden-Württemberg, 1982
