= Gingen an der Fils =

German municipality

- Municipality
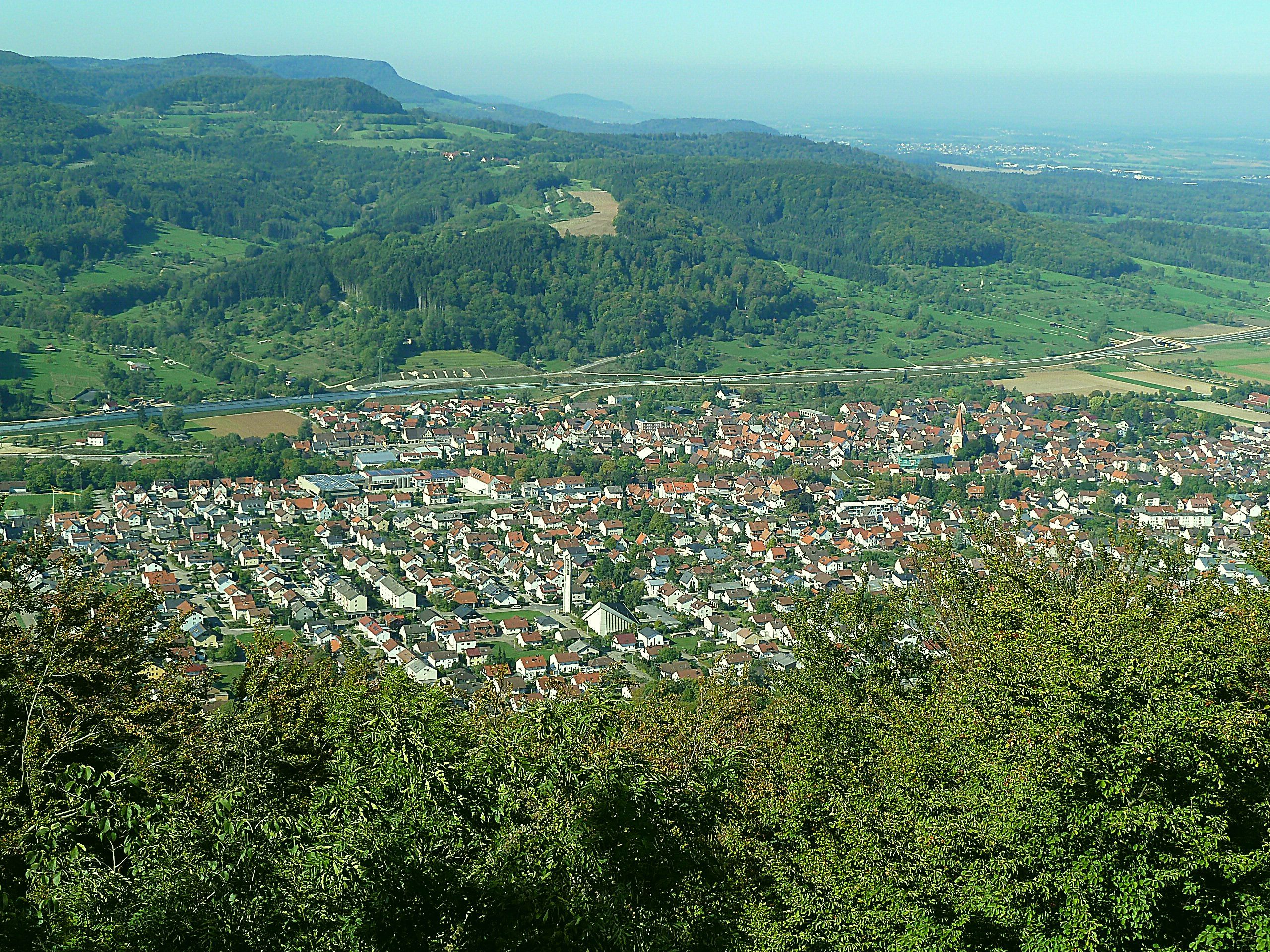
- View of Gingen

- Coat of arms

- Location of Gingen an der Fils within Göppingen district
- Interactive map of Gingen an der Fils
- Location within Germany Location within Baden-Württemberg
- Coordinates: 48°39′29″N 9°46′55″E
- Country: Germany
- State: Baden-Württemberg
- Admin. region: Stuttgart
- District: Göppingen

Area
  - Total: 10.02 km^{2} (3.87 sq mi)
- Elevation: 384 m (1,260 ft)

Population (2025-12-31)
  - Total: 4,436
  - Density: 442.7/km^{2} (1,147/sq mi)
- Time zone: UTC+01:00 (CET)
  - Summer (DST): UTC+02:00 (CEST)
- Postal codes: 73331–73333
- Dialling codes: 07162
- Vehicle registration: GP
- Website: www.gingen.de

Gingen an der Fils (German pronunciation: [ˈɡɪŋən ʔan deːɐ̯ ˈfɪls], lit. 'Gingen on the Fils') is a municipality in the district of Göppingen in Baden-Württemberg, Germany.

== Geography ==
The municipality (Gemeinde) of Gingen an der Fils is found in the district of Göppingen, in Baden-Württemberg, one of the 16 States of the Federal Republic of Germany. Gingen is physically located in the valley of the Fils, up to the hills of the Filsalb, in the central foothills of the Swabian Jura. Elevation above sea level in the municipal area ranges from a high of 701 meters (2,300 ft) Normalnull (NN) to a low of 385 meters (1,263 ft) NN.

Gingen an der Fils includes the hamlet of Grünenberg as well as the ghost town Marrbach.

=== Geological demographics ===
Type	Percentage of land
Agriculture	53.6%
Forest area	28.2%
Buildings	10.3%
Streets, roads	5.6%
Other (Note: Including bodies of water and recreation areas.)	2.3%

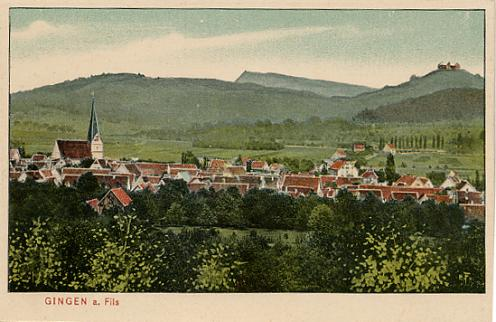
Postcard from Gingen an der Fils created by Eugen Felle in 1900.

== History ==
Some time between 1382 and 1396, Gingen was sold by the County of Helfenstein to the Free Imperial City of Ulm, whose bailiff resided in the town until 1750. Gingen became a possession of the Electorate of Bavaria in 1802, but was ceded in 1810 to the Kingdom of Württemberg. Gingen was assigned to Oberamt Geislingen. In 1845, the town was connected to the growing network of railways in Europe by the construction of the Fils Valley Railway. Gingen was reassigned in 1938 to the district of Göppingen and entered a period of urban growth after World War II, nearly doubling in physical size. Since the turn of the millennium, urban sprawl has primarily been to Gingen's west.

== Politics ==
Gingen has one borough (Ortsteil), Gingen an der Fils, and three villages: Grünenberg, Hämmelplatz, and Marren. The abandoned villages of Ferrenbronn, Liebenweiler, Marchbach, and Weschenbeuren are also found in the municipal area.

=== Council ===
The municipal council in Gingen has 14 members. The municipal elections on May 26, 2019 led to the most recent council members.

=== Mayors ===
- 1945–1948: Kaleb Fetzer
- 1948–1954: Karl Schmid
- 1954–1986: Heinz Nagel
- 1986–2010: Lothar Schober (parteilos)
- since 2010: Marius Hick (CDU)

== Insignia ==
=== Coat of arms ===
Gingen an der Fils's coat of arms displays a field of white crossed by a bend sinister, in blue, with a red in the top left corner of the blazon. This pattern was devised and adopted for use by the municipal council in 1922 and refers to the river Fils and to a local church where, supposedly, the oldest surviving written document in Germany was written. The Federal Ministry of the Interior approved the coat of arms and issued a corresponding municipal flag on 5 December 1958.

== Transportation ==
Gingen is connected to Germany's network of roadways by Bundesstraße 10 and to its system of railways by the Fils Valley Railway. Local public transportation is provided by the Filsland Mobilitätsverbundes.
