= Ohmden =

Municipality in Baden-Württemberg, Germany

- Municipality
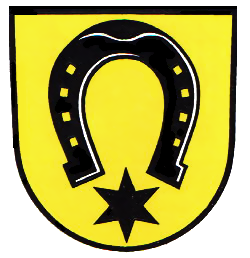
- Coat of arms

- Location of Ohmden within Esslingen district
- Interactive map of Ohmden
- Location within Germany Location within Baden-Württemberg
- Coordinates: 48°38′44″N 9°31′35″E
- Country: Germany
- State: Baden-Württemberg
- Admin. region: Stuttgart
- District: Esslingen

Government
  - Mayor (2018–26): Barbara Born

Area
  - Total: 5.55 km^{2} (2.14 sq mi)
- Elevation: 363 m (1,191 ft)

Population (2025-12-31)
  - Total: 1,712
  - Density: 308/km^{2} (799/sq mi)
- Time zone: UTC+01:00 (CET)
  - Summer (DST): UTC+02:00 (CEST)
- Postal codes: 73275
- Dialling codes: 07023
- Vehicle registration: ES
- Website: www.ohmden.de

Ohmden (German pronunciation: [ˈoːmdn̩]) is a municipality in the district of Esslingen in Baden-Württemberg in Germany.

== Neighboring communities ==
Neighboring municipalities are starting from North clockwise: Schlierbach, Hattenhofen, Zell unter Aichelberg, all district Göppingen and Holzmaden and Kirchheim unter Teck, both in the district of Esslingen.

== Municipality arrangement ==
The municipality includes the village of Ohmden and the courtyards Lindenhof and Talhof.

Ohmden Esslingen district

== History ==
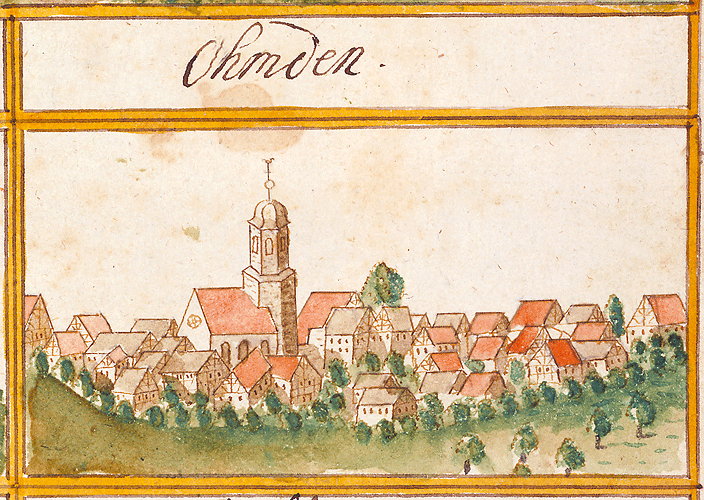
Ohmden 1683/1685 in the Kieser forest stock book

Ohmden is the first time documented under the name "Amindon" in 1125 in San Rotulus Petrinus, a parchment of the monastery of the Abbey of Saint Peter in the Black Forest. It describes a barter transaction in which Conrad I, Duke of Zähringen assigned the place to the monastery. Later, the village fell to the monastery Adelberg. Ecclesiastical it belonged to Kirchheim unter Teck. Since 1938 Ohmden belonged to the district Nürtingen, and since 1973 to the district of Esslingen.

== Religions ==
Since the Reformation Ohmden is Protestant coined. To date, the majority of citizens are Protestant. However, there is since 2002 the Catholic Community Centre St. Markus, where regular Catholic services take place. St. Markus is affiliated with the Church St. Ulrich in Kirchheim unter Teck.

== Mayor ==
- 1952–1986 Walter Kröner
- 1987–2010 Manfred Merkle
- 2010–2018 Martin Funk
- since 2018 Barbara Born

== Crest ==
The coat of arms shows Ohmden in black a six-pointed star with a horseshoe on a yellow shield. What is certain is that the star was a different area to crest with a horseshoe symbol that repeatedly returned to Württemberg, introduced only to distinguish and has no historical significance. The current coat of arms was awarded on 11 December 1973 by the Ministry of the Interior of Baden-Württemberg.

== Education ==
Ohmden has its own primary school. Older students have to go to the neighboring towns to attend secondary schools.

== Buildings ==
Especially worth seeing is the Protestant Church of St. Cosmas and Damian from the 17th century. It contains four altar wings pictures of Thomas Schick, that show scenes from the life of the two Saints Cosmas and Damian and are built around 1500.

== Fossil site ==
Fossils can be found at the Museum of Natural History Hauff in Holzmaden. Ohmdenosaurus is named after the municipality.

== Sons and daughters of the town ==
Karl Scheufelen (1823–1902), entrepreneur, and founder of Scheufelen paper mill in Lenningen.

== Literature ==
- Hans Schwenkel: Heimatbuch des Kreises Nürtingen. Band 2. Würzburg 1953, S. 992–1005.
- Der Landkreis Esslingen. Hrsg. vom Landesarchiv Baden-Württemberg i.V. mit dem Landkreis Esslingen. Band 2, Jan Thorbecke Verlag, Ostfildern 2009, ISBN 978-3-7995-0842-1, S. 325.
- Walter Kröner: Ohmdener Schicksale - 1920 bis 1950. Ohmden 1997,
