= Dürnau, Göppingen =

Dürnau
- Municipality
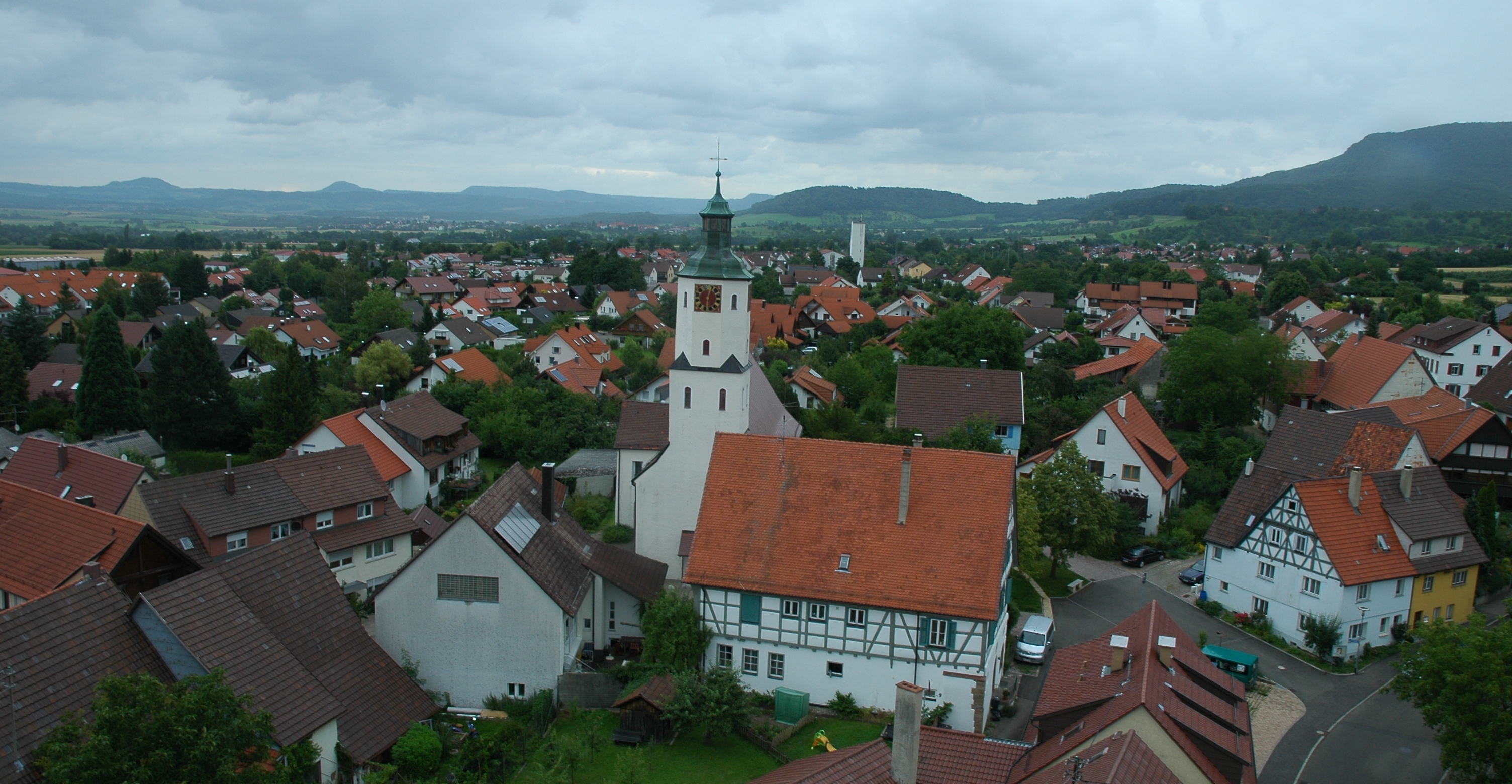
- Panorama of Dürnau

- Coat of arms

- Location of Dürnau within Göppingen district
- Interactive map of Dürnau
- Location within Germany Location within Baden-Württemberg
- Coordinates: 48°38′34″N 9°38′16″E
- Country: Germany
- State: Baden-Württemberg
- Admin. region: Stuttgart
- District: Göppingen

Government
  - Mayor (2016–24): Markus Wagner

Area
  - Total: 5.37 km^{2} (2.07 sq mi)
- Elevation: 543 m (1,781 ft)

Population (2025-12-31)
  - Total: 2,180
  - Density: 406/km^{2} (1,050/sq mi)
- Time zone: UTC+01:00 (CET)
  - Summer (DST): UTC+02:00 (CEST)
- Postal codes: 73105
- Dialling codes: 07164
- Vehicle registration: GP
- Website: www.duernau.de

Dürnau (German pronunciation: [ˈdʏʁnaʊ]) is a municipality in the district of Göppingen in Baden-Württemberg in southern Germany.

== Geographical location ==
Dürnau is on the edge of the Swabian Jura, about ten kilometers south of the county town Göppingen. The highest point is in the south on the border to the municipality of Gruibingen between Köpfle and Kornberg. The lowest point is north of the border to the municipality Heiningen.

== Neighboring communities ==
The municipality borders in the north Göppingen and Heiningen, in the east Gammelshausen, in the south Gruibingen and in the west Bad Boll.

== Municipality arrangement ==
The municipality Dürnau includes the village and the houses Ölmühle and Wilhelmshöhe.

== History ==
The origin of the name is not entirely clear. Presumably, the name derives from a medieval watchtower, which stood on the territory of the present municipality. The place was first time mentioned as "Durnon" in 1275 in the liber decimatonis.

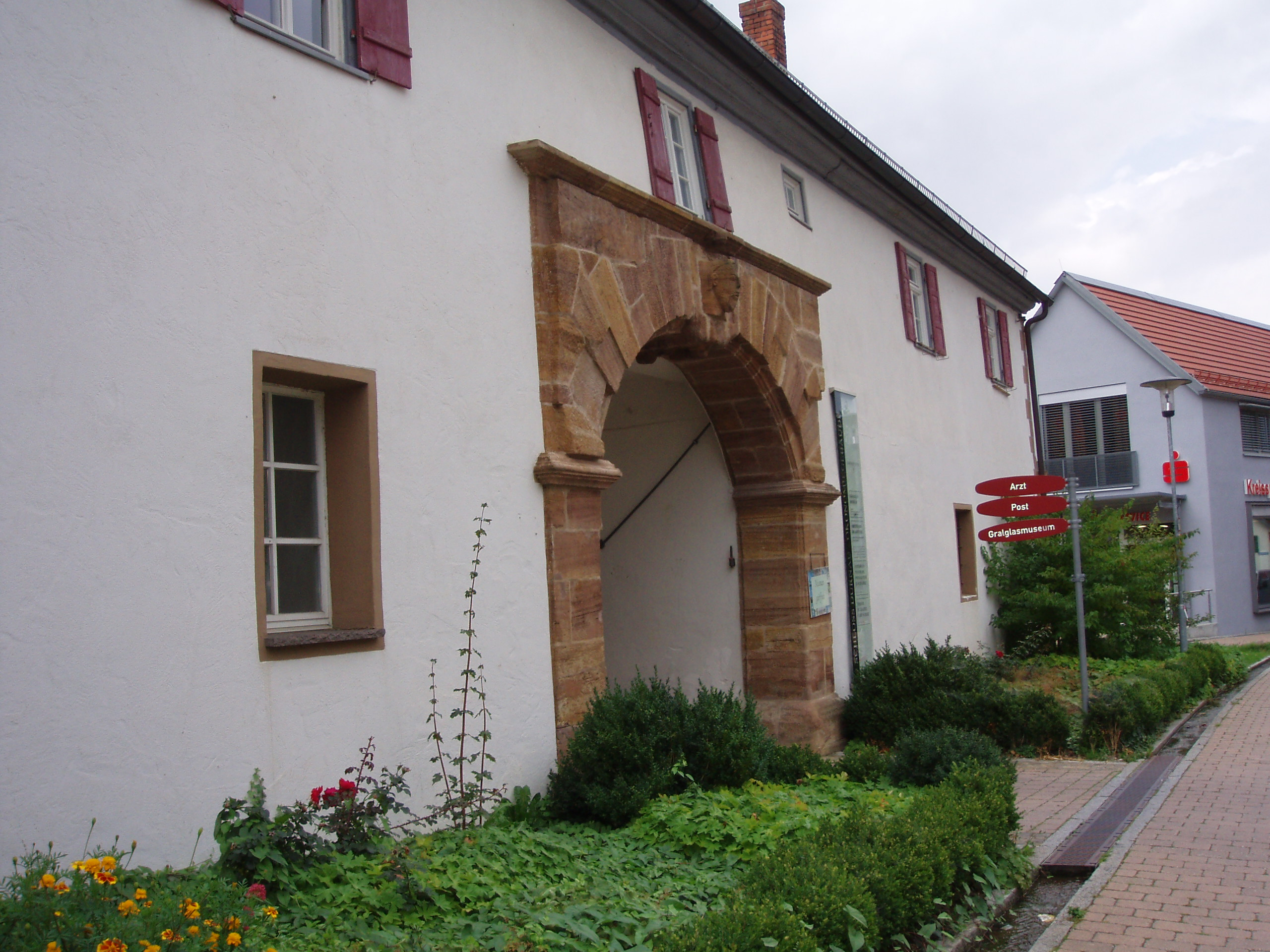
Dürnau former water castle

The low noble family Dürner of Dürnau was from the 13th to the 15th century probably as ministerials in the service of the Earl of Aichelberg. 1339 Dürnau became part of Württemberg. 1479 Ulrich, Duke of Württemberg sold the place to the gentlemen of Zillenhardt. After the extinction of the last Lord of Zillenhrdt in 1623 the village fell to the lords of Degenfeld. 1684 the place was sold to the Electorate of Bavaria.

Because of the German mediatization Dürnau 1806 became again part of Württemberg and came to Oberamt Göppingen. With the municipal reform 1938 the district came part of Göppingen.

== Religion ==
Since the Reformation Dürnau is Protestant. Only since 1963, there is again a Roman Catholic church, which belongs to the parish of Bad Boll.

== Population Development 1837-2013 ==
| Datum | Einwohner |
|---|---|
| 1837 | 668 |
| 1907 | 508 |
| 17. Mai 1939 | 458 |
| 13. September 1950 | 801 |
| 27. Mai 1970 | 1.514 |
| 31. Dezember 1983 | 1.520 |
| 31. Dezember 2000 | 2.033 |
| 31. Dezember 2005 | 2.092 |
| 31. Dezember 2010 | 2.083 |
| 31. Dezember 2013 | 2.082 |

== Politics ==
Since 1970 Dürnau belongs to the administration unit area Bad Boll.

== Mayor ==
The mayor is Markus Wagner, elected in 2016. He succeeded Friedrich Buchmaier, who had been in office since 1986.

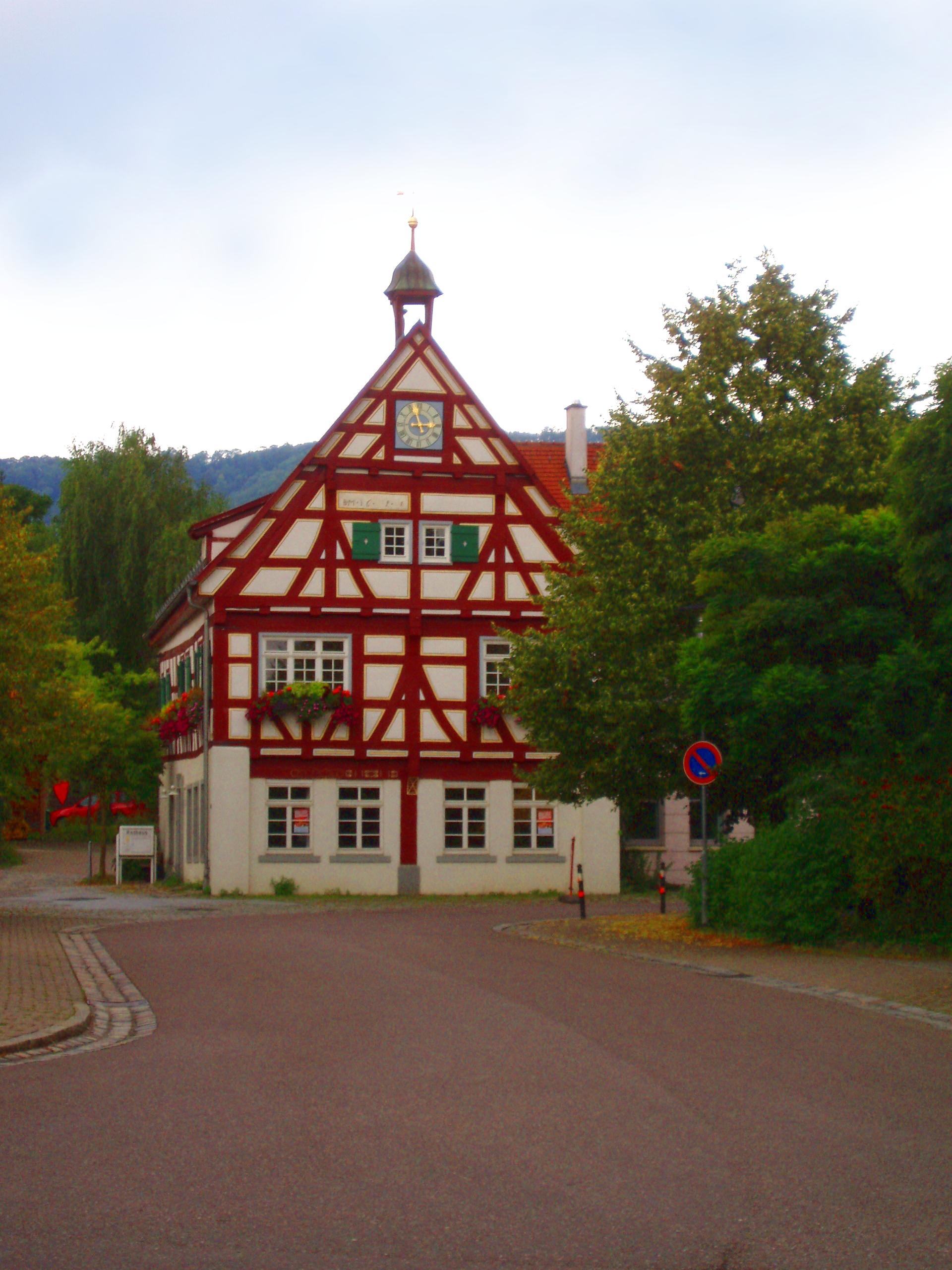
Dürnau Town hall

== Council ==
The Dürnau council has 10 members. The council consists of the elected honorary councilors and the mayor as chairman. The mayor is entitled to vote in the municipal council.

== Crest ==
The blazon of the municipal coat of arms of Dürnau is: Argent, a black hunting horn with golden fetters. The coat of arms can be seen from the former local aristocracy of men of Dürnau, and was adopted in 1923. The derived flag colors black and white were awarded by the Ministry of the Interior on 18 February 1959.

== Educational institutions ==
Dürnau has a common primary school and a common children's house with Gammelshausen.

== Leisure and sports facilities ==
Dürnau has two sports fields, two tennis courts, a basketball court and a hard court. A youth house for young people is in Dürnau. There is also the Kornberg hall, which has a stage and thus can be used for cultural events. In the basement of the Kornberg hall is a gym and a teaching pool, which is also open to individuals. The hall of the Protestant church is also used for smaller events.

== Transport ==
Dürnau is reachable by a road to Gammelshausen and Bad Boll. With the municipality Heiningen Dürnau is connected via a dirt road, which is however not released for public transport for transit. The connection point Aichelberg the Bundesautobahn 8 is located approximately 7 km away. Dürnau was also a halt of the Voralbbahn, which has ceased operation till 1989. Since then Dürnau is connected only through a bus line, for instance with the county town Göppingen.
