= Schlat =

German municipality

- Municipality
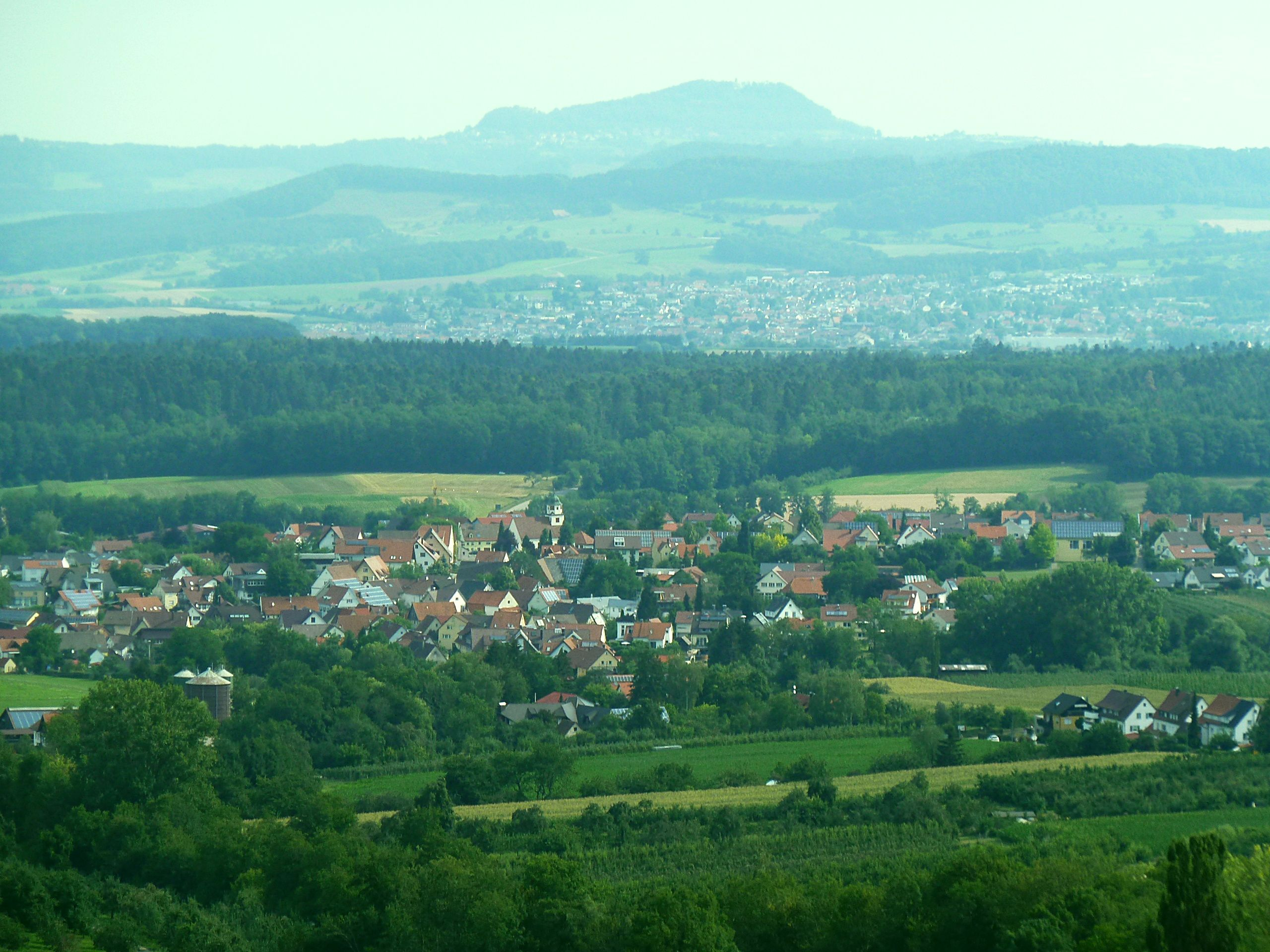
- View of Schlat

- Coat of arms

- Location of Schlat within Göppingen district
- Interactive map of Schlat
- Location within Germany Location within Baden-Württemberg
- Coordinates: 48°39′9″N 9°42′28″E
- Country: Germany
- State: Baden-Württemberg
- Admin. region: Stuttgart
- District: Göppingen

Government
  - Mayor (2023–31): Karin Gansloser

Area
  - Total: 9.68 km^{2} (3.74 sq mi)
- Elevation: 412 m (1,352 ft)

Population (2025-12-31)
  - Total: 1,670
  - Density: 173/km^{2} (447/sq mi)
- Time zone: UTC+01:00 (CET)
  - Summer (DST): UTC+02:00 (CEST)
- Postal codes: 73114
- Dialling codes: 07161
- Vehicle registration: GP
- Website: www.schlat.de

Schlat is a municipality in the district of Göppingen in Baden-Württemberg, Germany.

== History ==
Schlat changed owners several times during the Middle Ages. Barbara von Schlat, a local noblewoman, sold a third of the town in 1410 to Adelberg Abbey, which already controlled nearby properties donated to it by the County of Württemberg. The other two thirds of the town were inherited by the House of Liebenstein. As a result of the Protestant Reformation in the Holy Roman Empire, Adelberg Abbey was secularized and its holdings seized by the Duchy of Württemberg, which purchased the Liebenstein's portion of Schlat in 1789. The portions of Schlat were until 1807 divided between a district based out of the old abbey and Oberamt Göppingen. The Oberamt was reorganized as a Landkreis in 1938 and Schlat remained in its jurisdiction. The town grew after World War II to its east and south.

== Geography ==
The municipality (Gemeinde) of Schlat is located at the center of the district of Göppingen, in the German state of Baden-Württemberg. Schlat is physically located at the foot of the Filsalb, in the central foothills of the Swabian Jura. Elevation above sea level in the municipal area ranges from a high of 751 meters (2,464 ft) Normalnull (NN) at the top of the Wasserberg to a low of 368 meters (1,207 ft) NN.

== Politics ==
Schlat has one borough (Ortsteil) and three villages: Fuchseckhof, Rommental, and Ursenwang. There are also two abandoned villages, Dollenkirchen and Zillenhart, in the municipal area. Schlat is in an mutually-beneficial municipal association with the municipalities of Wangen and Wäschenbeuren.

=== Coat of arms ===
Schlat's coat of arms displays a sheep, in red, grazing below the branch of an apple tree, in green with four leaves and one red apple, upon a field of yellow. The images on the municipal on the blazon refer to Schlat's history of agriculture, especially husbandry. The coat of arms was awarded along with a municipal flag by the Federal Ministry of the Interior on 30 June 1959.

== Transportation ==
Schlat is connected to Germany's network of roadways by Bundesstraße 10. Local public transportation is provided by the Filsland Mobilitätsverbundes.
