= Heiningen =

- Municipality
- Coat of arms

- Location of Heiningen within Göppingen district
- Interactive map of Heiningen
- Location within Germany Location within Baden-Württemberg
- Coordinates: 48°39′43″N 9°38′54″E
- Country: Germany
- State: Baden-Württemberg
- Admin. region: Stuttgart
- District: Göppingen

Government
  - Mayor (2024–32): Matthias Kreuzinger

Area
  - Total: 12.46 km^{2} (4.81 sq mi)
- Elevation: 381 m (1,250 ft)

Population (2025-12-31)
  - Total: 5,060
  - Density: 406/km^{2} (1,050/sq mi)
- Time zone: UTC+01:00 (CET)
  - Summer (DST): UTC+02:00 (CEST)
- Postal codes: 73092
- Dialling codes: 07161
- Vehicle registration: GP
- Website: www.heiningen-online.de

Heiningen (German pronunciation: [ˈhaɪnɪŋən]) is a municipality in the Göppingen district in Baden-Württemberg in southern Germany at the base of the Swabian Alps.

== History ==
The town first emerges in an archive of the Abbey of St. Gall on parchment dated 29 March 1228, in which a "F. Plebanus de Huningen," the priest of Huningen, is mentioned.

The most important document of the history of Heiningen, however, is the 27 Aug 1284 "Freedom Letter", to the King Rudolph von Habsburg at the request of Duke Konrad von Teck, to whose sovereignty Heiningen belonged and who was a solid supporter of the King Rudolph. The letter bestowed to the town of Heiningen the same rights of Freiburg in Briesgau.

In possessing the same city rights as Freiburg, Heiningen had in principle all the privileges of a medieval town: city walls, moat, free citizens, market rights, jurisdiction over its laws, and coat of arms and official seal. Unfortunately, Heiningen's legal status as a city was fleeting, although its city rights were never technically revoked. Duke Konrad Von Teck, as a result of hostilities with his neighbors, was not in the position to expand and complete his young city plans. In 1291 King Rudolf died and in 1292 Duke Konrad died. The Teck sovereignty decayed appreciably, and Heiningen lost its claim. In 1321 the impoverished sons of Konrad sold their holdings "below the Egge" (Fuchseck Mountain), to which Heiningen and Boll belonged, to Count Eberhard I von Württemberg.

The counts of Württemberg understandably gave precedence to their city of Göppingen, which was more geographically and politically convenient. Heiningen was absorbed into the Göppingen district and was reduced to the rank of a small marketplace. In a document from Feb 10, 1489, on which appears the oldest exhibit of the Heinginen Coat of Arms, Heiningen is noted as a "market town".

The people of Heiningen have sought from then on to gain strength, to preserve a maximum of freedom, and to let themselves renew and affirm these values. With these values Heiningen continued carrying on within their jurisdiction, and there was no serfdom, only the Heiningen Market became an anchored tradition which reached the present time.

In 1284 a royal document records the establishment of the Heiningen weekly market, which remained for many years, but ended sometime in the 18th century. Since May 24, 1985 it restarted and since then has enjoyed great popularity in the community.

Heiningen's market was quite successful. Probably because of this, under the administration of the Counts of Württemberg, a reconstruction and fortification of gothic Michael's Church began. The counts endeavored to build up and secure towns on the border areas of their territory.

The late gothic Funfachtel choir building with its beautiful vaulted arches the ornamentation of the Michaels Church and also the sacristy originated without a doubt due to the Cloister Adelberg, which was quite well off and in 1393 through exchange with Wurttemberg had acquired authority over the church matters of Heiningen, such as the right to assign priests. Likewise the cloister had the responsibility to provide the church and priests' salary as public services. The priest house had the same builder from 1493. It may also be credited to the Cloister that Heiningen had a school already by 1466.

Like one can imagine, the town had its share of war and calamity. The worst disaster came during the 30 Years War, after the Battle of Nördlingen in 1634, when the emperor's troops swept through the city like a roaring flood. The troops completely plundered the town and perpetrated horrible atrocities on the inhabitants. Due to famine and horrible plague, the population sank from about 1000 before the war to about a fifth of that after. At the end of the war houses stood empty and abandoned.

Since World War II many "Heimatvertriebene" refugees moved to Heiningen. These refugees were ethnic Germans that lived in an area, such as Bohemia, that fell under new government after the war.

In 1975, one of the few known Middle Jurassic ichthyosaur fossils was discovered at Heiningen. Because it was put into storage for lack of researchers at that time, the importance of this find was not realized until 2012.

== Religion ==
Since the Reformation, Heiningen has been mostly Protestant. The immigration of Heimatvertriebene after the war did lead to a founding of a Roman Catholic Parish, which also serves nearby Eschenbach.

== Census ==
The population of the community between 1837 and 2005.

Date	Inhabitants
1837	1130
1907	1185
1939	1309
1950	1980
1970	3422
1983	4877
2005	5480
