= Sielenwang =

Mountain in Baden-Württemberg, Germany

Coordinates: 48°38′N 9°40′E

Highest point
- Elevation: 720 m above sea level (NHN) (2,360 ft)

Geography
- Location: Baden-Württemberg, Germany

Sielenwang is a mountain of Baden-Württemberg, Germany.
