= Eschenbach (Göppingen) =

- Municipality
- Coat of arms

- Location of Eschenbach within Göppingen district
- Interactive map of Eschenbach
- Location within Germany Location within Baden-Württemberg
- Coordinates: 48°39′30″N 9°40′11″E
- Country: Germany
- State: Baden-Württemberg
- Admin. region: Stuttgart
- District: Göppingen

Government
  - Mayor (2018–26): Thomas Schubert

Area
  - Total: 4.80 km^{2} (1.85 sq mi)
- Elevation: 458 m (1,503 ft)

Population (2025-12-31)
  - Total: 2,100
  - Density: 440/km^{2} (1,100/sq mi)
- Time zone: UTC+01:00 (CET)
  - Summer (DST): UTC+02:00 (CEST)
- Postal codes: 73107
- Dialling codes: 07161
- Vehicle registration: GP
- Website: www.gemeinde-eschenbach.de

Eschenbach is a municipality in the district of Göppingen in Baden-Württemberg in Germany.

== Geography ==
=== Geographical location ===
Eschenbach is located in the valley of the river of the same name, at the foot of the Swabian Jura. The district town Göppingen is 6 kilometers away.

=== Overview ===
With an area of 480 ha Eschenbach is one of the smallest villages in the district of Göppingen. Through its location in the area before the Swabian Jura the municipality has however developed from a farming community to a municipality with around 2,200 inhabitants.

=== Neighboring communities ===
Since 1970, the municipality forms together with the neighboring community Heiningen the Gemeindeverwaltungsverband Voralb. (Administration Unit Voralb).

Eschenbach in Göppingen district

=== Municipality arrangement ===
Eschenbach includes the village Eschenbach, the hamlet Lotenberg (also to community Heiningen) and the homestead Iltishof and the dialed villages Hag and Bürstenhof.

== History ==
=== Early history ===
The probable beginning of settlement for the place is between the 9th and 13th centuries. Eschenbach means ash-trees at a river. The eponymous Eschenbach springs beneath the "Weisse Mauer" (white wall) on the Fuchseck mountain. The first written reference does not refer to the place, but to the church on the Lotenberg. In 1228, in a document of the Abbey of St. Gall, a pastor, and thus a church, is mentioned on the Lotenberg. The group of houses on the Lotenberg still conveys the image of a castle building.

=== Middle Ages ===
Especially Eschenbach is first mentioned in 1379 in a deed of sale of the Counts of Helfenstein. It changed hands of several owners and was finally divided from 1476: two thirds from Iltishausen (Iltishof) and Lotenberg belonged to the barons of Liebenstein, the rest was owned by the monastery of Adelberg and after the Reformation since 1534 by the Duchy of Württemberg. Until 1867 Eschenbach was administered by Adelberg, later by the Oberamt Göppingen.

=== 20th century ===
The place was until after the Second World War dominated by agriculture. The place lived mainly from the animals: cattle, horses and sheep, especially because the arable soils were not very productive. An important role played also the fruit growing, particularly encouraged by the pastor Johann Christian Engel, the father of Dr. Theodor Engel.

=== Population development ===
The inhabitants of the community: Development 1837-2010.

- Date Population
- 1837, 508
- 1907, 401
- May 17, 1939 392
- September 13, 1950 643
- May 27, 1970 1,023
- December 31, 1983 1,687
- December 31, 2005 2,232
- March 31, 2010 2,181

=== Space division ===
- 309 ha farmland area
- 71 ha forest area
- 61 ha building area
- 28 ha transportation area
- 11 ha other area

According to data of the State Statistical Office Baden-Württemberg in Stuttgart, as of 2014.

== Politics ==
=== Council ===
The council of Eschenbach has 10 members. The local elections on 25 May 2014 led to the following official results. The council consists of the elected honorary councilors and the mayor as chairman. The mayor is entitled to vote in the municipal council.

- BAE Citizen Action Eschenbach: 53.24% = 5 seats
- FWV Free Voters Association Eschenbach: 46.76% = 5 seats

=== Economy and infrastructure ===
The Gewerbepark Göppingen-Voralb an association of the city Göppingen and the municipalities Eschenbach and Heiningen, has erected the industrial park Göppingen-Voralb with approximately 29 ha.

== Education and culture ==
=== Preschools ===
The kindergarten is located in the Theodor Engel meetinghouse. Since 1992 the civic community has a further kindergarten. Thereby, the municipality is able to offer at any time every three-year-old child a place in a kindergarten in the community.

== Schools ==
The primary school includes the primary classes 1 to 4; currently are visiting over 100 students primary school. The Hauptschule is located in the neighboring municipality Heiningen. Schools of all types are available in Göppingen.

== Regular events ==
The annual herb festival recalls the earlier significant herb cultivation.

== Personality ==
Sons and daughters of the town

- Theodor Engel, (1842-1933), theologian and geologist
- Rudolf Bilfinger, (1903-1996), the lawyer was sentenced to eight years' imprisonment for involvement in war crimes after the Second World War. After that he was an official, he was suspended in 1965 because of his involvements in war crimes
