= Wasserberg (Swabian Jura) =

Mountain in Baden-Württemberg, Germany

- Location within Baden-Württemberg

Highest point
- Elevation: 750.6 m above sea level (NHN) (2,464 ft)
- Coordinates: 48°38′11″N 9°42′46″E

Geography
- Location: Baden-Württemberg, Germany
- Parent range: Swabian Jura

Geology
- Rock type: White Jurassic

Wasserberg is a mountain in the Swabian Jura in the German state of Baden-Württemberg. Elevation of the summit is often listed as 751 m above sea level (NHN) (2,464 ft) however the official height stated by the State Office for Geoinformation and Land Development (LGL) is 750.6 m above sea level (NHN) (2,463 ft).
