= Albershausen =

- Municipality
- Coat of arms

- Location of Albershausen within Göppingen district
- Interactive map of Albershausen
- Location within Germany Location within Baden-Württemberg
- Coordinates: 48°41′29″N 9°33′54″E
- Country: Germany
- State: Baden-Württemberg
- Admin. region: Stuttgart
- District: Göppingen

Government
  - Mayor (2018–26): Jochen Bidlingmaier

Area
  - Total: 6.5 km^{2} (2.5 sq mi)
- Elevation: 328 m (1,076 ft)

Population (2025-12-31)
  - Total: 4,408
  - Density: 680/km^{2} (1,800/sq mi)
- Time zone: UTC+01:00 (CET)
  - Summer (DST): UTC+02:00 (CEST)
- Postal codes: 73095
- Dialling codes: 07161
- Vehicle registration: GP
- Website: www.albershausen.de

Albershausen in Göppingen district

Albershausen (German pronunciation: [albɐsˈhaʊzn̩]) is a municipality in the district of Göppingen in Baden-Württemberg in southern Germany.

== Location ==
Albershausen is located between the lower Filstal and the Swabian Jura at the Butzbach, a small left tributary of the Fils. The village stretches along the national road B 297 between Uhingen and Kirchheim unter Teck.

== Municipality arrangement ==
Albershausen includes the village Albershausen, the Weiler Schafhof and the homestead Öschlenshof and the risen in Albershausen or dialed villages Schlichingen, Büheln, Haßlach, Negelli, Bettenweiler and Schenkenmühle.

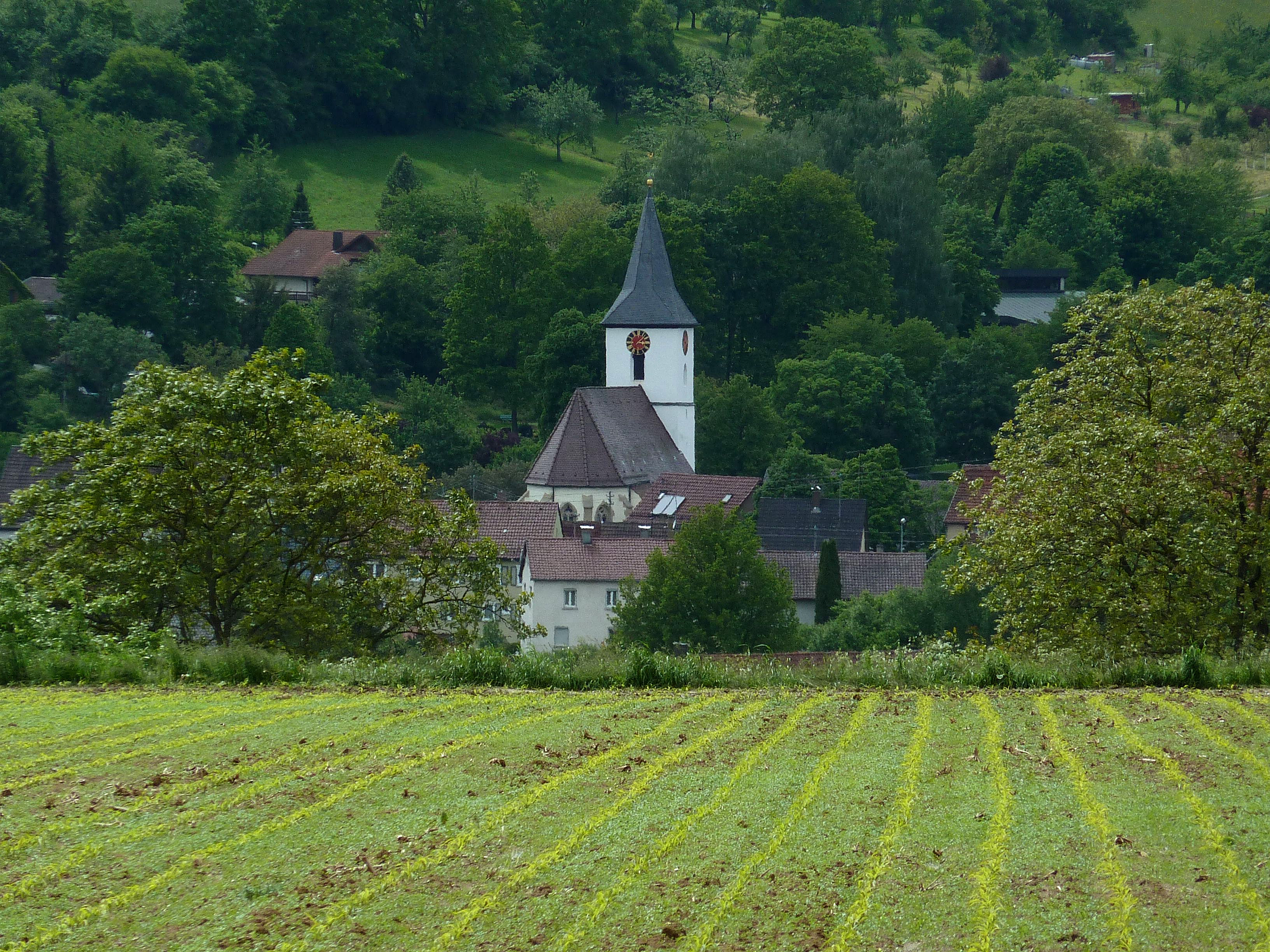
Albershausen church

== Mayor ==
The mayor is elected for a term of eight years. Since 21 April 2010, Jochen Bidlingmaier is the mayor of Albershausen. He received when choosing 7 February 2010 83.3% of the vote.

== Crest ==
The blazon of the municipal coat of arms of Albershausen is: In silver the green capital letter A, including a linkshin lying green tulip. The arms of Albershausen is the only letter of Arms in the district of Göppingen. On 3 February 1959, the Ministry of Internal Affairs of the municipality gave the flag colors green and white.

== Teams ==
A total of around 20 clubs in Albershausen are active. The TSGV Albershausen 1896 eV (gymnastics, sports and singing club). It is the biggest club with 16 departments and offers from American football to table tennis a wide range of sports.

== Literature ==
- Municipality Albershausen: 700 Jahre Albershausen 1275–1975, Albershausen 1975
- Haas, Erwin: Albershausen im Wandel der Zeit, Albershausen 1989
- Haas, Erwin: Geschichten aus Albershausen, Albershausen 1989
