= Aichelberg =

- Municipality
- Coat of arms

- Location of Aichelberg within Göppingen district
- Interactive map of Aichelberg
- Location within Germany Location within Baden-Württemberg
- Coordinates: 48°38′16″N 9°33′51″E
- Country: Germany
- State: Baden-Württemberg
- Admin. region: Stuttgart
- District: Göppingen

Government
  - Mayor (2021–29): Heike Schwarz

Area
  - Total: 4.01 km^{2} (1.55 sq mi)
- Elevation: 482 m (1,581 ft)

Population (2025-12-31)
  - Total: 1,285
  - Density: 320/km^{2} (830/sq mi)
- Time zone: UTC+01:00 (CET)
  - Summer (DST): UTC+02:00 (CEST)
- Postal codes: 73101
- Dialling codes: 07164
- Vehicle registration: GP
- Website: www.aichelberg.de

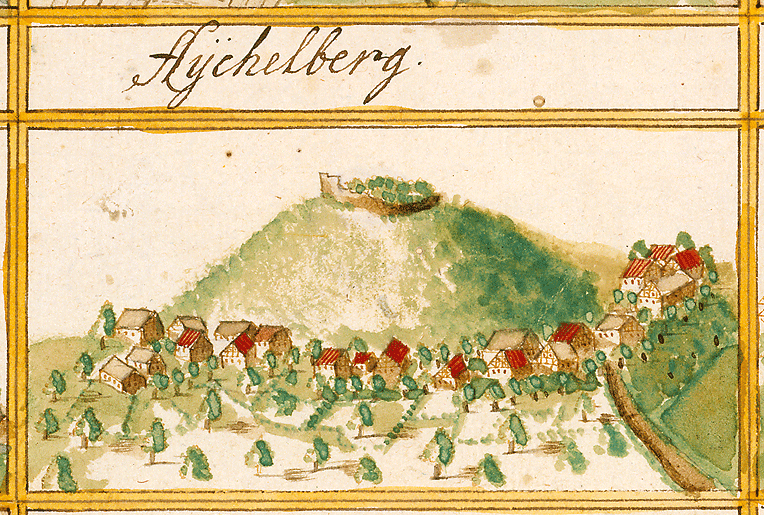
Aichelberg, 1683

Aichelberg (German pronunciation: [ˈaɪçl̩bɛʁk]) is a municipality in the district of Göppingen in Baden-Württemberg in southern Germany.

Aichelberg is between Stuttgart and Ulm at the Albaufstieg, the slope of the Swabian Jura in 357–615 meters altitude. Characteristic of the location are the Aichelberg (564 m above sea level) and the Turmberg (609 m above sea level).

== Geology ==
The northern and western part of the district lies on Black Jurassic, the other part on Brown Jurassic. Numerous fossils have been found mainly in the construction of the motorway. They can be seen at the Museum of Natural History Hauff in the neighboring community Holzmaden. The community is part of the in 1979 formed excavation reserve.

== Neighboring communities ==
Neighboring municipalities are: Bad Boll, Zell unter Aichelberg and Gruibingen, all in the district of Göppingen, as well as Ohmden, Holzmaden and Weilheim an der Teck in the district of Esslingen.

== History ==
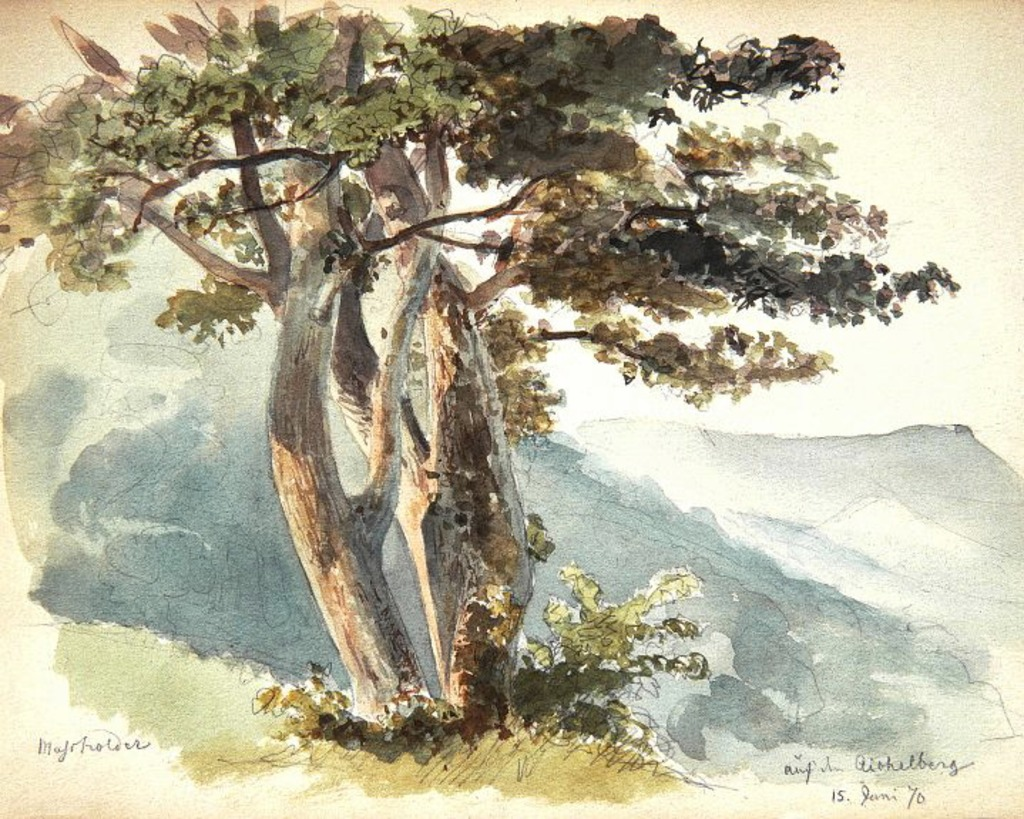
A field maple on the Aichelberg, watercolor painting of General Eduard von Kallee, 15 June 1870

Aichelberg was already in ancient times a settlement site. Thus, a Roman brick distillery and tableware shards from the 3rd century were found in November 2012 in excavations prior to the construction of the Wendlingen–Ulm high-speed railway near the A 8.

Around 1220 a castle was built by the Counts of Aichelberg. 1330 the castle and village of Aichelberg went to the Counts of Kirchheim. The Counts of Aichelberg sold Aichelberg in 1334 to the House of Württemberg under Ulrich III. 1519 Aichelberg was almost completely destroyed by soldiers of the Swabian League. 13 houses were burned. In 1525 during the German Peasants' War, the castle was burned down.

In 1810 Aichelberg came to Oberamt Kirchheim unter Teck. On 19 May 1876 Aichelberg became an independent municipality. In the course of the administration reform 1938 Aichelberg came to the Göppingen district.

=== Number of inhabitants ===
| Date | Number of inhabitants |
|---|---|
| 1837 | 303 |
| 1907 | 330 |
| 17 May 1939 | 289 |
| 13 September 1950 | 460 |
| 27 May 1970 | 688 |
| 31 December 1983 | 867 |
| 31 December 1990 | 884 |
| 31 December 2000 | 1.194 |
| 31 December 2005 | 1.231 |
| 31 December 2010 | 1.294 |

== Council ==
The council of Aichelberg has eight members. It was elected at the municipal elections on 7 June 2009. The turnout was 54.7%, which was 4.1 percentage points lower than in the local elections in 2004.

== Mayor ==
The mayor of Aichelberg is Heike Schwarz, elected in October 2021.

== Crest ==
Coat of arms

The blazon of the municipal coat of arms of Aichelberg is as follows: In red above a silver (white) trimount three (2:1) rising silver acorns.

White-red are the colors of the Counts of Aichelberg. A green acorn on a silver background represented the community in 1949. The current coat of arms was introduced on 25 January 1958, to distinguish Aichelberg from the then existing homonymous municipality in the district of Esslingen, which is now part of Aichwald.

== Transportation ==
See also Drackensteiner Hang

The Bundesautobahn 8 passes the municipality Aichelberg with the exit Aichelberg. The slope of the Aichelberg has been used for the construction of the motorway in the Third Reich for the Albaufstieg, overcoming the about 380 meters of altitude in the northern edge of the Alb. The valley floor is about half the height between foothills and plateau. The rise could be divided into two parts, the Aichelberg and the Drackensteiner Hang.

The climb beside the Aichelberg was mastered originally by a long, curved bridge, the Aichelberg-Viaduct. In expanding the range 1985-1990 this bridge was completely removed and replaced by a three-lane ascent. The noise and dust of the expansion, which was at the time the largest highway construction project in Europe, affected the inhabitants of Aichelberg for several years.

== Education ==
In Aichelberg there is a kindergarten but no school. Aichelberg's pupils go to the primary school in the neighboring municipality Zell unter Aichelberg.

== Literature ==
- Gemeinde Aichelberg, Sportverein Aichelberg: 100 Jahre selbstständige Gemeinde Aichelberg. Aichelberg 1976.
- Jens Glasser, Thomas Buchtzik: Bau und Geschichte der Reichsautobahn am Albaufstieg. Arnstadt 2008.
- Heinz-Günther Grüneklee. "Zeitgenössische Berichte aus der Parochie Aichelberg (Schurward) von 1804 bis 1921". Hennecke 1995, ISBN 978-3-927981-45-4
