= Bad Boll =

German municipality

- Municipality
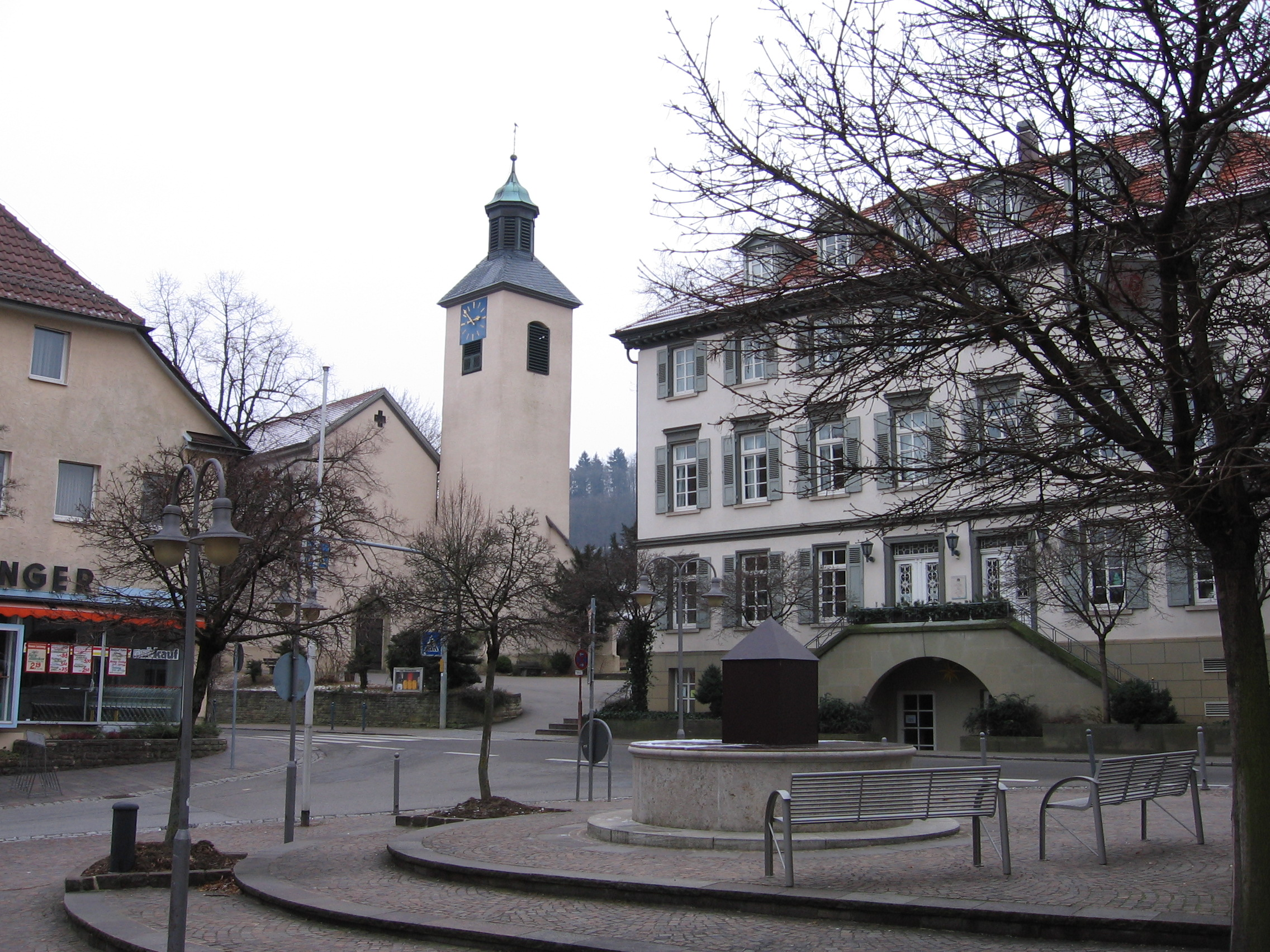
- Town center with the Church of Saint Cyriacus

- Coat of arms

- Location of Bad Boll within Göppingen district
- Interactive map of Bad Boll
- Location within Germany Location within Baden-Württemberg
- Coordinates: 48°38′22″N 9°36′56″E
- Country: Germany
- State: Baden-Württemberg
- Admin. region: Stuttgart
- District: Göppingen

Government
  - Mayor (2020–28): Hans-Rudi Bührle

Area
  - Total: 10.95 km^{2} (4.23 sq mi)
- Elevation: 427 m (1,401 ft)

Population (2025-12-31)
  - Total: 5,048
  - Density: 461.0/km^{2} (1,194/sq mi)
- Time zone: UTC+01:00 (CET)
  - Summer (DST): UTC+02:00 (CEST)
- Postal codes: 73085–73087
- Dialling codes: 07164
- Vehicle registration: GP
- Website: www.bad-boll.de

Bad Boll (German pronunciation: [baːt ˈbɔl]) is a municipality in the district of Göppingen in Baden-Württemberg, Germany.

== History ==
In 1321, the County of Württemberg purchased title over Bad Boll and came to possess it de jure, but it was de facto still controlled by a local priory. That changed with the conversion of the then Duchy of Württemberg to Lutheranism and the seizure of church property. Since 1321, Bad Boll has been placed under the jurisdiction of Göppingen. The hot springs around Bad Boll were discovered in 1595. A year later, the first spa in the municipality was constructed by Heinrich Schickhardt. That spa was rebuilt and expanded from 1823 to 1825. Eckwälden was incorporated into Bad Boll in 1933. The first Evangelical Academy in Germany was established in Bad Boll in 1945. Bad Boll changed its name from Boll to Bad Boll in 2007.

== Geography ==
The municipality (Gemeinde) of Bad Boll is found towards the western periphery of the district of Göppingen in Baden-Württemberg, one of the 16 States of the Federal Republic of Germany. Bad Boll is physically located in the foothills of the central Swabian Jura, though a portion of its municipal area lies in the Middle Kuppenalb to the southeast. Elevation above sea level in the municipal area ranges from a high 734 meters (2,408 ft) Normalnull (NN) to a low of 367 meters (1,204 ft).

A portion of the Federally-protected Teufelsloch-Kaltenwang nature reserve is located in Bad Boll's municipal area.

== Politics ==
Bad Boll has one borough (Ortsteile), Boll, and two villages: Bad Boll and Eckwälden. Bad Boll is part of a municipal association with the municipalities of Aichelberg, Dürnau, Gammelshausen, Hattenhofen, and Zell unter Aichelberg.

=== Coat of arms ===
The municipal coat of arms of Bad Boll displays a white fountain with white waters and a stag antler, in black, upon a field of green. The fountain is a reference to the local hot springs and the stag antler to Württemberg. The Federal Ministry of the Interior awarded this coat of arms and a municipal flag to Bad Boll on 25 January 1961.

== Transportation ==
Bad Boll is connected to Germany's network of roadways by its local Landesstraßen and Kreisstraßen, which join the Bundesautobahn 8 at Aichelberg. From 1926 to 1989, Bad Boll was also connected to Germany's railroads by the Voralbahn, which was formally closed in 1997 but not dismantled. Local public transportation is provided by the Filsland Mobilitätsverbundes.
