= Gammelshausen =

German municipality

- Municipality
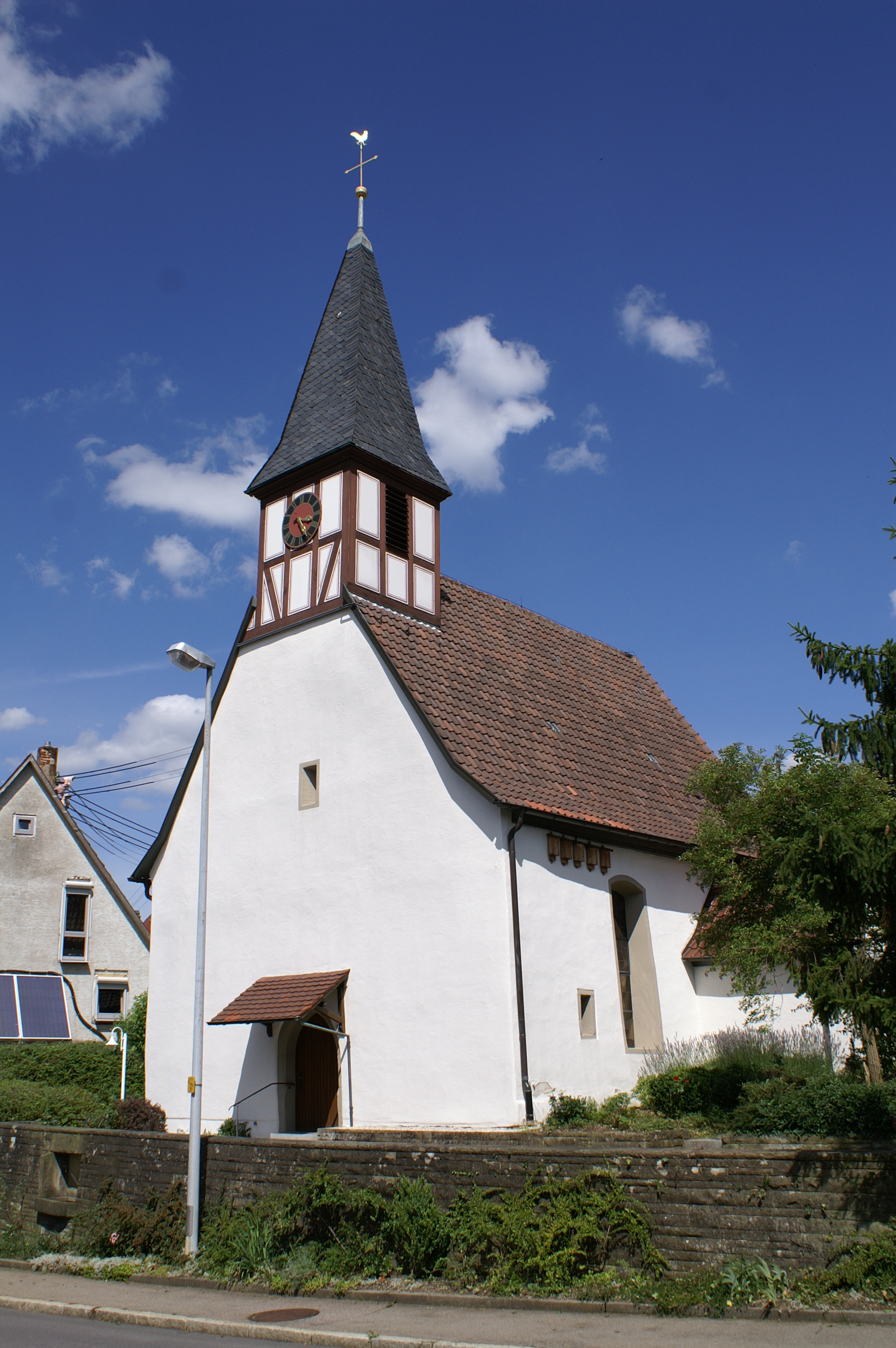
- Evengelist Church, Gammelshausen

- Coat of arms

- Location of Gammelshausen within Göppingen district
- Interactive map of Gammelshausen
- Location within Germany Location within Baden-Württemberg
- Coordinates: 48°38′30″N 9°39′1″E
- Country: Germany
- State: Baden-Württemberg
- Admin. region: Stuttgart
- District: Göppingen

Area
  - Total: 3.31 km^{2} (1.28 sq mi)
- Elevation: 442 m (1,450 ft)

Population (2025-12-31)
  - Total: 1,530
  - Density: 462/km^{2} (1,200/sq mi)
- Time zone: UTC+01:00 (CET)
  - Summer (DST): UTC+02:00 (CEST)
- Postal codes: 73108
- Dialling codes: 07164
- Vehicle registration: GP
- Website: www.gammelshausen.de

Gammelshausen is a town in the district of Göppingen in Baden-Württemberg, Germany.

== History ==
Gammelshausen was purchased by the County of Württemberg in 1321 but then in 1479 passed out of Württemberg's control and into that of the House of Zyllnhardt with Dürnau. Gammelshausen returned to Württemberg in 1806, when it was mediatized to the Kingdom of Württemberg and assigned to the district of Göppingen. After World War II, Gammelshausen began a period of urban growth that has since the turn of the millennium two areas to the town's southeast established in the 1970s. A redevelopment of the town center began in 2009 and was scheduled to conclude in 2017.

== Geography ==
The municipality (Gemeinde) of Gammelshausen is located in the district of Göppingen, in Baden-Württemberg, one of the 16 States of the Federal Republic of Germany. Gammelshausen is physically located in the central foothills of the Swabian Jura. Elevation above sea level in the municipal area ranges from a high of 545 meters (1,788 ft) Normalnull (NN) to a low of 442 meters (1,450 ft) NNl.

== Politics ==
Gammelshausen has one borough (Ortsteil): Gammelshausen. The municipality is in a municipal association with Bad Boll.

=== Coat of arms ===
Gammelshausen's coat of arms shows a red house with one door and three windows below two cherries upon a field of yellow. The house represents Gammelshausen itself, and the cherries its history of local cherry cultivation. This coat of arms was awarded by the Federal Ministry of the Interior on 9 October 1959, along with a corresponding municipal flag.

== Transportation ==
Gammelshausen is connected to Germany's network of roadways by the Bundesautobahn 8, which join the municipality's local Landesstraßen und Kreisstraßen at a junction 9 kilometers (5.6 mi) outside of its municipal area. Local public transportation is provided by the Filsland Mobilitätsverbundes.
