= Lauter =

Lauter may refer to:

== People ==
- Lauter (surname)

== Places ==
- Lauter, Saxony, town in the district of Aue-Schwarzenberg, Saxony, Germany
- Lauter, Bavaria, village in the district of Bamberg, Bavaria, Germany

== Rivers ==
- Lauter (Baunach), tributary to the Baunach in Bavaria, Germany
- Lauter (Blau), tributary to the Blau in Baden-Württemberg, Germany
- Lauter (Danube), or "Große Lauter", tributary to the Danube in Baden-Württemberg, Germany
- Lauter (Fils), tributary to the Fils in Baden-Württemberg, Germany
- Lauter (Glan), or "Waldlauter", tributary to the Glan in Rhineland-Palatinate, Germany
- Lauter (Hasel), tributary to the Hasel in Thuringia, Germany
- Lauter (Itz), tributary to the Itz in Bavaria, Germany
- Lauter (Murr), tributary to the Murr in Baden-Württemberg, Germany
- Lauter (Neckar), tributary to the Neckar in Baden-Württemberg, Germany
- Lauter (Rhine), or "Wieslauter", tributary to the Rhine in Rhineland-Palatinate, Germany, and in Alsace, France
- Lauter (Odenwald), tributary of the Rhine in Hesse, Germany, springs in the Odenwald
- Lauter (Schlitz), tributary to the Schlitz in Hesse, Germany

== See also ==
- Lauder (disambiguation)
- Lautering, process in brewing beer
