= Winterlauter =

River in Germany

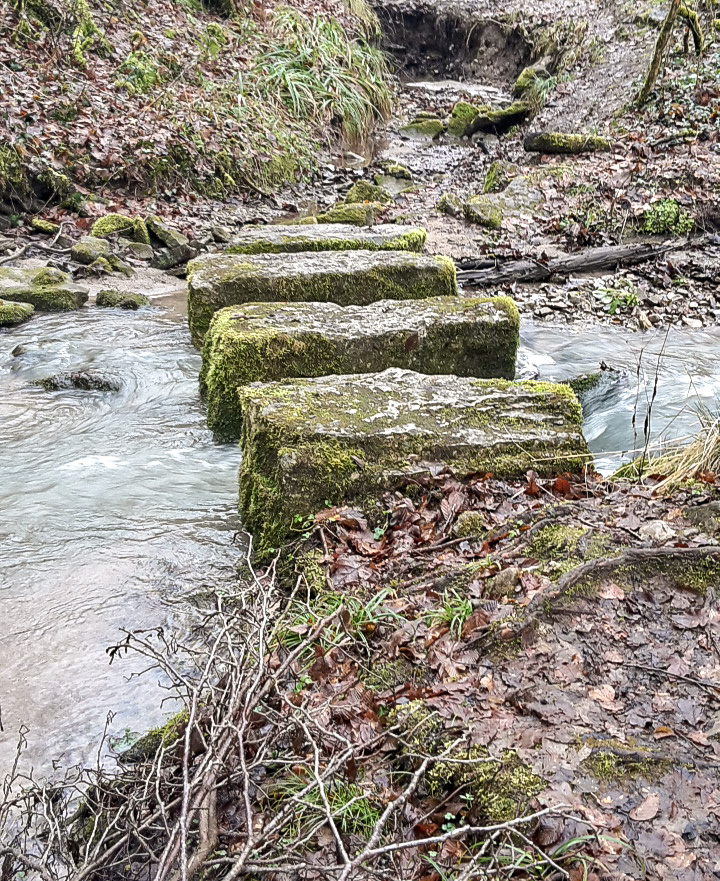

Location
- Country: Germany
- State: Baden-Württemberg

Physical characteristics
- Mouth
  - location: Lauter
  - coordinates: 49.0216°N 9.4577°E

Basin features
- Progression: Lauter→ Murr→ Neckar→ Rhine→ North Sea

Winterlauter is a small river of Baden-Württemberg, Germany. It flows into the Lauter near Spiegelberg.

== See also ==
- List of rivers of Baden-Württemberg
