= Eichelbach =

Eichelbach may refer to:

- Eichelbach (Baunach), a river of Bavaria, Germany, tributary of the Baunach
- Eichelbach (Nidda), a river of Hesse, Germany, tributary of the Nidda
- Eichelbach (Weil), a river of Hesse, Germany, tributary of the Weil
