= Nassach =

Nassach may refer to:

- Nassach (Fils), a river of Baden-Württemberg, Germany, tributary of the Fils
- Nassach (Main), a river of Bavaria, Germany, tributary of the Main
- Nassach, a village belonging to Spiegelberg, a town in Baden-Württemberg in Germany
- Nassach, a village belonging to Aidhausen, a municipality in Bavaria in Germany
