= Rohrach (Eyb) =

River of Baden-Württemberg, Germany

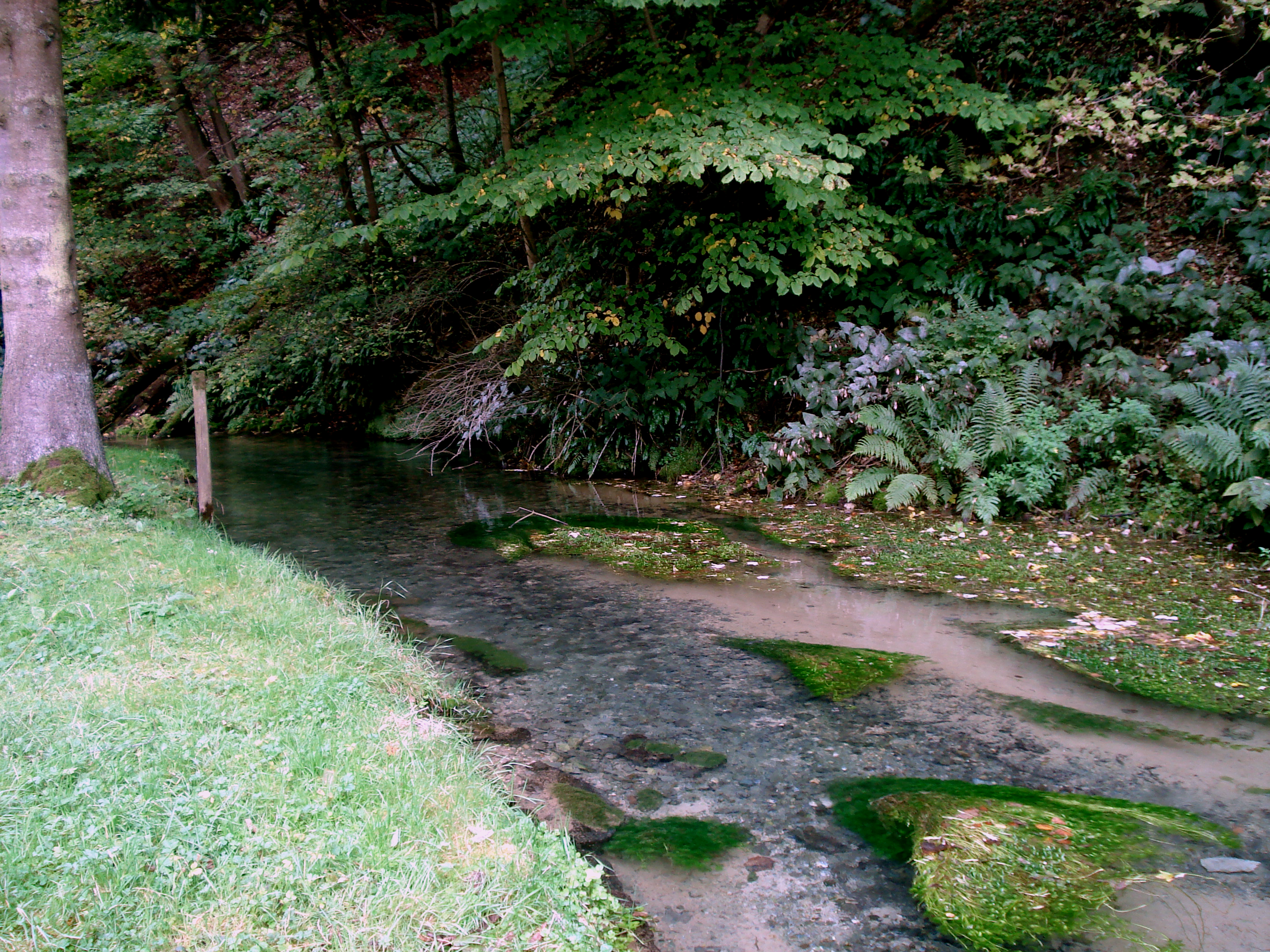
- The source of the Rohrach

Location
- Country: Germany
- State: Baden-Württemberg

Physical characteristics
- Mouth
  - location: Eyb
  - coordinates: 48.6256°N 9.8361°E

Basin features
- Progression: Eyb→ Fils→ Neckar→ Rhine→ North Sea

Rohrach is a river of Baden-Württemberg, Germany. It is a left tributary of the Eyb at Geislingen an der Steige.

== See also ==
- List of rivers of Baden-Württemberg
