= Buchenbach (disambiguation) =

Buchenbach is a municipality in the south west of the Black Forest in Germany.

Buchenbach or Büchenbach may also refer to:

- Büchenbach, a municipality in the district of Roth, in Bavaria, Germany
- Büchenbach (Pegnitz), a district of Pegnitz, in Upper Franconia, Bavaria, Germany
- Büchenbach (Erlangen), a district of Erlangen, in Middle Franconian, Bavaria, Germany
- Buchenbach (Lauter), a river in Baden-Württemberg, Germany, tributary of the Lauter
- Buchenbach (Murr), a river in Baden-Württemberg, Germany, tributary of the Murr
