= Lauda =

Lauda may refer to:

- "Lauda" (song), a type of medieval and Renaissance Italian song

== Airlines ==
- Lauda (airline), a former low-cost airline formerly known as Laudamotion
- Lauda Air, a defunct airline that became part of Austrian Airlines
- Lauda Europe, a Maltese low-cost airline

== Places ==
- Lauda, Warmian-Masurian Voivodeship, a village in northern Poland
- Lauda, a borough of the city of Lauda-Königshofen, Baden-Württemberg, Germany

== People with the name ==
- Brittany Lauda (born 1993), U.S. voice actress
- Ernst Lauda (1859 - 1932), Austrian engineer and father of Hans Lauda
- Hans Lauda (1896 - 1974), Austrian industrialist and grandfather of Niki Lauda
- Jan Lauda, Czech sculptor instructor of Arpád Račko
- Mathias Lauda (born 1981), Austrian race car driver, son of Niki Lauda
- Niki Lauda (1949–2019), Austrian Formula 1 racing driver, father of Mathias Lauda
- Vladislav Lauda (born 1955), Czech footballer
