= Lauder (disambiguation) =

Lauder is a town in the Scottish Borders 27 miles south east of Edinburgh.

Lauder may also refer to:

- Lauder (Parliament of Scotland constituency), pre-1707
- Lauder (surname)
- Lauder, Manitoba, a small community in Cameron Rural Municipality, Manitoba, Canada
- Lauder, New Zealand, a small community in Central Otago, New Zealand
- Lauder Baronets
- Lauder College or Carnegie College
- Lauder Institute
- Lauder Schools of Prague

== See also ==
- Lauter (disambiguation)
- Lauda (disambiguation)
