= Gos (Fils) =

River in Germany

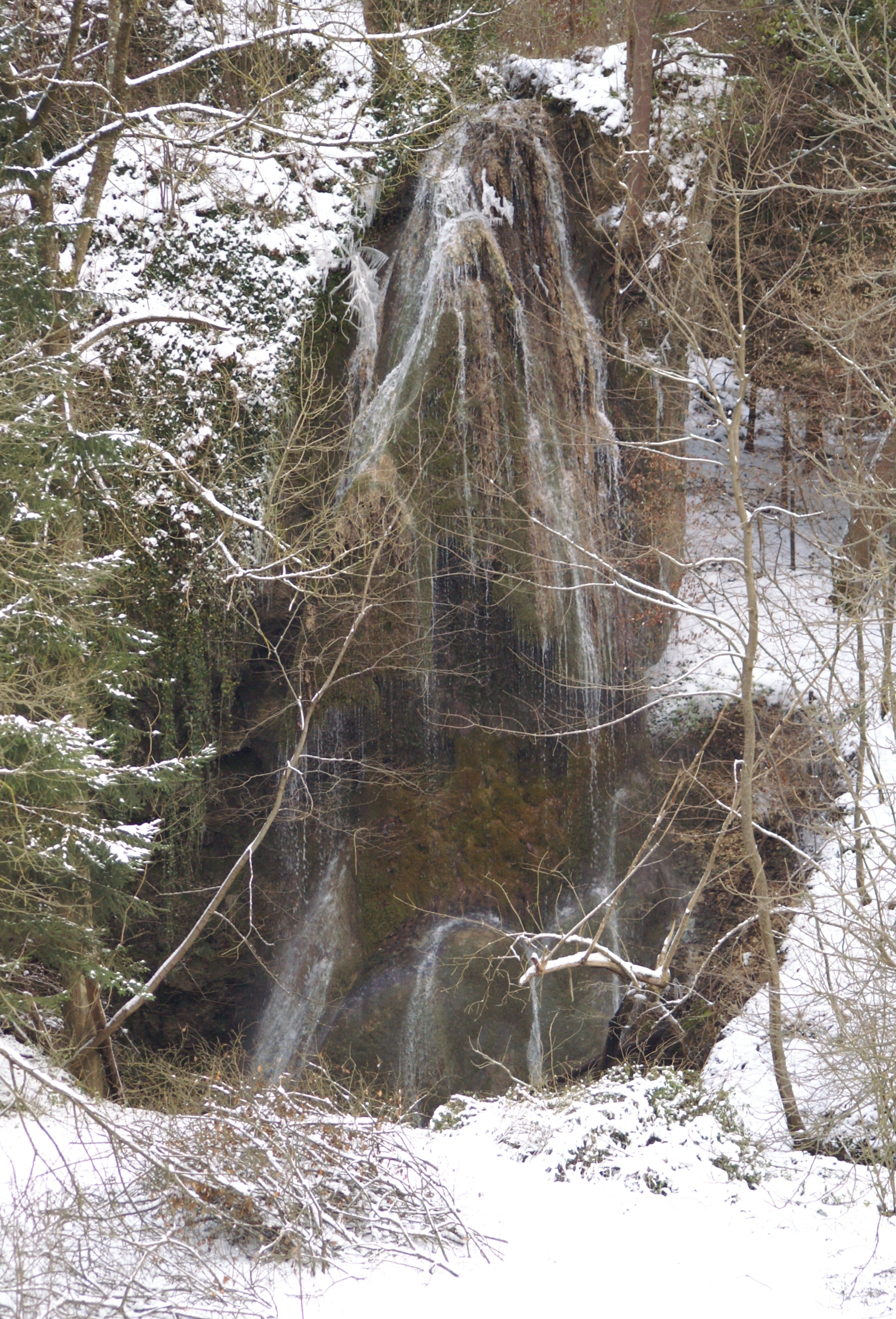
- The waterfall of the Gos river

Location
- Country: Germany
- State: Baden-Württemberg

Physical characteristics
- Mouth
  - location: Fils
  - coordinates: 48.5808°N 9.6810°E
- Length: 3.8 km (2.4 mi)

Basin features
- Progression: Fils→ Neckar→ Rhine→ North Sea

The Gos is a 3.8-kilometre (2.4 mi)-long river of Baden-Württemberg, Germany. It is a tributary of the Fils near Bad Ditzenbach.

== See also ==
- List of rivers of Baden-Württemberg
