= Li Bonan =

Chinese director (born 1978)

Li Bonan (Chinese: 李伯男; pinyin: Lǐ Bónán; born November 1978) is a Chinese director.

Li has produced over forty full-length plays, including How Much Love can be Borrowed (2006), Single Lady (2008), Married to a Budget Husband (2009) and Fake Single (2010). His plays have won numerous awards, including the 2nd National Drama Culture Award of China, the Golden Lion Award (the highest award in the performing arts in China), and Best Director Award at the 9th International Theatre Festival Donzdorf, Germany.

== Early life and career ==
Li was born in 1978 in Beijing. He holds a Bachelor of Arts and an MFA in directing from the Central Academy of Drama. Li was also educated at Beijing Film Academy and Shanghai Theatre Academy.

Upon his graduation from the academy,, Li directed his first full-length play, How Much Love can be Borrowed (2006). It earned critical acclaim and remains one of the highest-grossing theatrical productions in China.

Li then created the Love Trilogy, which consists of three full-length plays focusing on the relationship issues of China's new generation. The plays in the sequence are Single Lady (2008), Married to a Budget Husband (2009) and Fake Single (2010). The Love Trilogy was adapted to books, and TV series. Li' is known for adapting contemporary stories on stage, and also for conveying traditional context with a modern twist.

Li is the artistic director of Li Bonan Theatre Studio, a member of the Tenth National Committee of the China Federation of Literary and Art Circles, and acknowledged by the China Ministry of Culture. He also serves as the artistic director at several regional theatres and performing art organizations across China.

== Honours and awards ==
- 2009: Shandong International Experimental Theatre Festival, Best Play, Best Director, for Camouflaging
- 2010: Most Popular Director of the Year, Sina China

Young Theatrical Director of the Year, The Global Times

- 2011: National Drama Culture Award, Best Original Play, Best Director, for Fake Single

BeSeTo Theatre Festival, Best Director

Shandong International Experimental Theatre Festival, Best Director

- 2012: the Golden Lion Award, Best Director
- 2013: Top 10 in the Theatrical Director category of the 2012 China Performing Arts Industry Ranking
- 2014: International Theatre Academy Award of the Central Academy of Drama, Best Play, for Fake Single
- 2015: International Theatre Festival Donzdorf, Germany, Best Play, Best Director, for Confucius

International Theatre Academy Award of the Central Academy of Drama, Best Play, for Single Lady

- 2016: Shanghai Critics’ Choice Awards, Best Play, for Dwelling in the Fuchun Mountains Legend

== Works ==
=== Full-length plays ===
| Play number | Title | Series | Premiere |
|---|---|---|---|
| 1 | How Much Love Can Be Borrowed | | 2006 |
| 2 | I Want To Be Famous | | 2007 |
| 3 | I Am Not My Girlfriend's Boyfriend | | 2008 |
| 4 | Single Lady | | 2008 |
| 5 | Camouflaging | | 2009 |
| 6 | Prison Break | | 2009 |
| 7 | Married To A Budget Husband | | 2009 |
| 8 | Fake Single | | 2010 |
| 9 | Do Not Bother | | 2010 |
| 10 | Happiness.Com | | 2010 |
| 11 | Glance Of A Witch | | 2011 |
| 12 | Half Sugar | | 2011 |
| 13 | Can't Afford To Flirt | | 2011 |
| 14 | Love A Little | | 2011 |
| 15 | The Withering Palace | | 2012 |
| 16 | Talking Nonsense | | 2012 |
| 17 | Murdering The Golden Age | | 2012 |
| 18 | When A Woman Starts To Age | | 2012 |
| 19 | Family Defend | | 2013 |
| 20 | Where Did The Time Go | | 2014 |
| 21 | Jump Ahead | | 2014 |
| 22 | Why So Panicked | | 2014 |
| 23 | Little Me | | 2014 |
| 24 | Confucius | | 2014 |
| 25 | Sports Game In The Forest | | 2014 |
| 26 | Story Of The Giant Stone | | 2015 |
| 27 | The Secrecy of Daily Life | | 2015 |
| 28 | Lao Zhang's Philosophy | | 2015 |
| 29 | The Crimson Gown | | 2015 |
| 30 | Pity Peony | | 2015 |
| 31 | The Chongqing Trilogy | Big Small Sausages | 2015 |
| 32 | The Chongqing Trilogy | My Toxic Bestie | 2015 |
| 33 | The Chongqing Trilogy | A Room With Two Beds | 2015 |
| 34 | Dwelling In The Fuchun Mountain's Legend | | 2016 |
| 35 | Hello Huiyin | | 2016 |
| 36 | Flowing East The Great River | | 2016 |
| 37 | Door No.21 | | 2016 |
| 38 | The Qiushui Mansion | | 2017 |
| 39 | Every Beautiful Thing | | 2017 |
| 40 | Tears Of Laughter | | 2018 |
| 41 | Guarding My Belief | | 2018 |
| 42 | The Strokes Of Innocence | | 2018 |
| 43 | In The Field Of Hope | | 2018 |
| 44 | The Amnesty | | 2018 |

=== One-act plays ===
| Play number | Title | Premiere |
|---|---|---|
| 1 | Came Bearing Gifts | 2014 |
| 2 | Found You | 2015 |
| 3 | Who Could It Be | 2016 |
| 4 | The Elementary Of Psychology | 2016 |
| 5 | City Statues | 2017 |
