= Donzdorf =

- Town
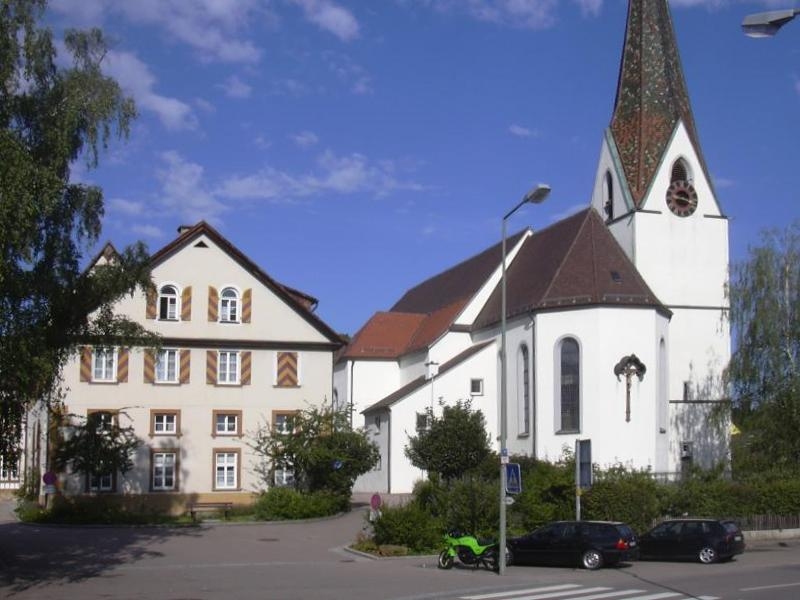
- Castle and church in Donzdorf.

- Coat of arms

- Location of Donzdorf within Göppingen district
- Interactive map of Donzdorf
- Location within Germany Location within Baden-Württemberg
- Coordinates: 48°41′N 9°49′E
- Country: Germany
- State: Baden-Württemberg
- Admin. region: Stuttgart
- District: Göppingen

Government
  - Mayor (2018–26): Marcel Davis

Area
  - Total: 39.82 km^{2} (15.37 sq mi)
- Elevation: 407 m (1,335 ft)

Population (2025-12-31)
  - Total: 10,550
  - Density: 264.9/km^{2} (686.2/sq mi)
- Time zone: UTC+01:00 (CET)
  - Summer (DST): UTC+02:00 (CEST)
- Postal codes: 73072
- Dialling codes: 07162
- Vehicle registration: GP
- Website: www.donzdorf.de

Donzdorf (German pronunciation: [ˈdɔntsˌdɔʁf]) is a town in the district of Göppingen in Baden-Württemberg in southern Germany.

It is located 12 km east of Göppingen, and 13 km south of Schwäbisch Gmünd. The town is home to Nuclear Blast Records, one of the biggest heavy metal music record companies in Germany.

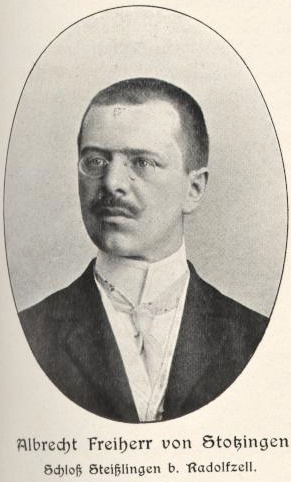
Albrecht von Stotzingen 1903

== Geography ==
Donzdorf is located in the valley of the river Lauter, a tributary of the Fils river, 12 km east of Göppingen, on an elevation between 334 and 749 metres.

=== Subdivisions ===
Donzdorf includes the former independent communities of Reichenbach unter Rechberg and Winzingen. According to the borders that were decided on 31 December 1973 the municipality of Donzdorf consists of the city Donzdorf, the hamlets Berghof, Grünbach, Hagenbuch, Hochberg, Kuchalb and Unterweckerstell, the farms Messelhof, Oberweckerstell, Rindersteig, Scharfenhof, Schmelzofen and Vogelhof and the houses Hagenbucher Mühle, Hürbelsbach, Immenreute, Lautergarten and Steinernes Kreuz, as well as the abandoned village Klingenhof. The former municipality of Reichenbach unter Reichberg consists of the village Reichenbach unter Rechberg, the hamlets Aichhöfle and Birkhof, the farms Bäuerleshof, Böppeleshof, Bühlhof, Dangelhof, Feldhöfle, Haldenhof, Hasenhof, Ilgenhof, Kratzerhof, Lauxenhof, Schattenhof, Schillingshof, Stappenhof, Staudenhof, Striethof, Strietmühle, Täscherhof, Weberhäusle and Zirschberg, the castle Ramsberg and house Messenhalden as well as the abandoned village Zimmerhöfle. The former municipality Winzingen consists of the village Winzingen.

== History ==
=== Up to the 18th century ===
The area around Donzdorf was already settled during Alemannic times which is proven by an old Alemanni cemetery discovered in 1964. There were over 100 graves from a time period between 600 and 700 AD.

In 1275 Donzdorf is first mentioned in the tax list of the diocese Konstanz. In that document the community is still called Tunesdorf. After the Staufer family went extinct a power struggle for Donzdorf erupted between the Counts of Helfenstein and the Lords of Rechberg which was eventually won by the Rechberg family. They ruled Donzdorf from the Scharfenschloss.

Donzdorf grew economically in the 15th century especially because of the high demand for Donzdorfer Sandstein (sandstone from Donzdorf). A lot of buildings in the area surrounding Donzdorf were built using this sandstone which had a particular high amount of iron and was therefore very resilient. It was also used to build parts of the Ulm Minster.

In 1478 the Lords of Rechberg built an administration building in the town and shortly afterwards began construction on the Gothic St. Martin's church. For this an altar was made by the famous Ulm artist Bartholomäus Zeitblom, the panels of which can be seen in the Würth collection in the Johanniterkirche Schwäbisch Hall.

In 1568 the Donzdorf castle was built in renaissance style. From this point on Donzdorf was only a side residence and was sold to the Duchy of Württemberg in 1735. In 1745 a Lady of Rechberg bought Donzdorf back and moved into the castle. Her son expanded the castle to make it his main residence and created the garden following the French design.

Around this time the people had fallen into poverty in the aftermath of the Spanish War of Succession. This was changed by Johann Benedikt Jehlin who built a smelting furnace that employed 80 people. However, the smelting furnace was soon shut down because it only had very small success and Jehlin went bankrupt. Nevertheless, the smelter has a historic value because it was one of the earliest industrial establishments in the Göppingen district.

=== 19th and 20th century ===
Because of the mediatization of all imperial knightly goods in 1803 Donzdorf went to the Electorate of Bavaria. Through a contract from 1810 it went back to Württemberg, where it would stay.

Through new administrative divisions of Württemberg it was assigned to Geislingen. In the administrative reform during Nazi times on April 25, 1938, Donzdorf was put into the district of Göppingen. 1945 it became a part of the American Occupation Zone and thus a part of the newly-formed Württemberg-Baden which in 1952 became the present state of Baden-Württemberg.

On 1 January 1974 Reichenbach unter Rechberg was incorporated into Donzdorf, as was Winzingen on 1 January 1975.

On 1 May 1976 Donzdorf was awarded city rights after reaching the population limit of ten thousand because of the incorporation.

=== Change of population ===
Historical population
Year	Pop.	±%
1837	2,589	—
1907	3,297	+27.3%
17 May 1939	4,320	+31.0%
13 September 1950	6,550	+51.6%
6 June 1961	7,683	+17.3%
27 May 1970	9,605	+25.0%
31 December 1983	11,039	+14.9%
25 May 1987	10,963	−0.7%
31 Dezember 1991	11,498	+4.9%
31 December 1995	11,317	−1.6%
31 December 2000	11,085	−2.1%
31 December 2005	11,073	−0.1%
31 December 2010	10,816	−2.3%
31 December 2015	10,769	−0.4%
Source: Statistisches Landesamt Baden-Württemberg for data after 1961

== Politics ==
=== Town council ===
The town council consists of a certain number of elected members with the mayor as chairman of the council. The town council of Donzdorf was last elected in the communal elections on 26 May 2019. It currently consists of 22 members. The results of the last election were as follows:

Parties and Voters Unions		% 2019	Seats; 2019	% 2014	Seats; 2014
CDU	Christian Democratic Union of Germany	40,09	9	50,64	12
FW	Free Voters	29,39	6	34,91	8
SPD	Social Democratic Party of Germany	9,27	2	14,44	3
GREENS	Alliance 90/The Greens	17,72	4	--	--
FDP	Free Democratic Party	3,54	1	--	--
In Total		100,0	22	100,0	23
Voters Turnout		63,32 %		49,55 %	

=== Town twinning ===
Donzdorf has a town partnership with the French Riorges and Neusalza-Spremberg in Saxony. In 2011 the establishment of a partnership with the Spanish city of Calasparra.

== Economy and Infrastructure ==
=== Traffic ===
Donzdorf is connected to the national road network by the B466 and has a bypass since 2010.

In 1901 the Lautertalbahn gave Donzdorf a connection to the regional rail network. The rail network eventually shut down with public transport ending in 1980 and transportation of goods in 1995. Nowadays the former station is used as a café and ice cream shop.

On the nearby Messelberg the Donzdorf airport is located which is used for gliders, small motorized aircraft and paragliding.

=== Resident companies ===
The most important employers in Donzdorf are the Michael Hörauf Machine factory and Stahlbau Wendeler. Donzdorf is also the origin of Nuclear Blast, one of the biggest Heavy Metal record labels in the world.

=== Education ===
Donzdorf has primary schools in both Donzdorf and the former municipalities. Donzdorf also has a Gemeinschaftsschule and a Gymnasium.

In addition to that Donzdorf has a small observatory.

== Sights ==
=== Buildings ===
- Donzdorf Castle, the old residential seat of the Lords of Rechberg which today acts as town hall. The house that stands where the first building of the castle used to stand nowadays houses a kindergarten and the volunteer fire brigade. Because the castle has been expanded and renovated several times there are parts built both in the Renaissance and the rococo style.
- Ramsberg Castle, another former residence of the Rechberg family
- Scharfenberg Castle, the original seat of the Lords of Rechberg, nowadays a ruin
- Winzingen Castle, castle in Winzingen that a lot of local myths are about

=== The Park ===
Originally planned as a French garden for Donzdorf Castle by Maximilian von Rechberg, the park features a fountain and many bronze statues. It was redesigned at the beginning of the 19th century into an English garden, but this was never completely finished.

=== Natural sights ===
- Simonsbachstausee, a dammed lake
- Lauter waterfall, 7 metres high
- Messelstein, a notable rock formation on the side of the Messelberg

== Notable residents ==
- Anton von Rechberg (1776–1837), Bavarian general and hofmeister
- Franz Anton Staudenmaier (1800–1856), a Catholic theologian
- Otto von Rechberg (1833–1918), nobleman of the kingdoms of Bavaria and Wurttemberg, 1899-1910 President of the Württemberg Chamber of lords
- Albrecht von Stotzingen (1864–1938), Baron and the deputy of the First Chamber of the State Baden
- Theodor Zeller (1900–1986), painter and graphic artist
- Gabriele Miller (1923–2010), born in the district Winzingen, Roman Catholic theologian
- Andreas Geiger (born 1969), film director
- Carolin Villforth (born 1981), PhD Astrophysicist. Expert in active galactic nuclei (AGN).

=== Honorary citizens ===
- Otto Maier
- Hermann Seimetz (born 1938), CDU politician and former member of the Landtag of Baden-Württemberg
