= Ditz (Fils) =

River in Germany

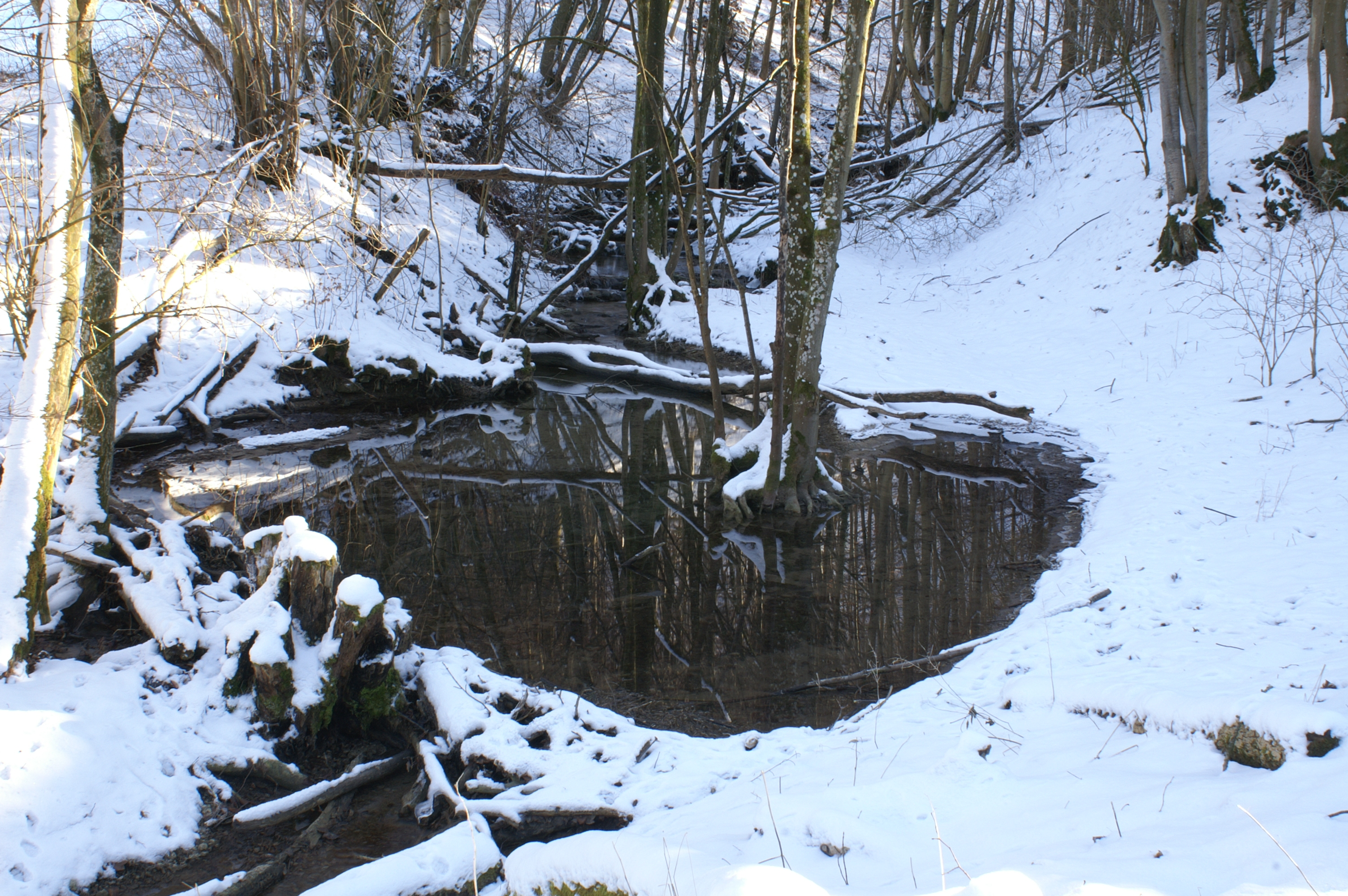

Location
- Country: Germany
- State: Baden-Württemberg
- Regierungsbezirk: Stuttgart
- District: Göppingen
- Municipality: Bad Ditzenbach

Physical characteristics
- Source
  - coordinates: 48.57261°N 9.70759°E
- Mouth: Fils
  - coordinates: 48.58791°N 9.70316°E

Basin features
- Progression: Fils→ Neckar→ Rhine→ North Sea

The Ditz is a small river in Baden-Württemberg, Germany. It flows into the Fils in Bad Ditzenbach.

== Geography ==
=== Course ===
The Ditz has its source at about 675 m above sea level in the slope debris below the Schläfhalde in a side valley between the Schloßberg with the Hiltenburg and the Oberbergfels. On the upper reaches the stream bed has numerous tufa terraces over which the water flows in small waterfalls. the tufa terraces have been designated as natural monuments. Just before it reaches Bad Ditzenbach, the Badwiesenbach flows towards it on its right side. In Bad Ditzenbach it finally flows into the upper Fils from the right at a height of about 504 m.

=== Tributaries ===
- Badwiesenbach ("right"), 1.2 km

== See also ==
- List of rivers of Baden-Württemberg
