= Rohrach =

Rohrach may refer to:

- Rohrach (Eyb), a river of Baden-Württemberg, Germany, tributary of the Eyb
- Rohrach (Iller), a river of Bavaria, Germany, tributary of the Iller
- Rohrach (Wörnitz), a river of Bavaria, Germany, tributary of the Wörnitz
