= Krumm (river) =

River in Germany

Location
- Country: Germany
- State: Baden-Württemberg

Physical characteristics
- Source
  - location: near the Fuchshof, Rechberg
  - elevation: 482 m (1,581 ft)
- Mouth
  - location: near Eislingen into the Fils
  - coordinates: 48°41′53″N 9°41′29″E
  - elevation: 330 m (1,080 ft)
- Length: 12.6 km (7.8 mi)
- Basin size: 30.0 km^{2}

Basin features
- Progression: Fils→ Neckar→ Rhine→ North Sea

Krumm is a short river on the edge of the Swabian Jura of about thirteen kilometers in length. It originates at the base of the Rechberg near the Fuchshof in Rechberg, south of Schwäbisch Gmünd. From there the river makes its way through Ottenbach and Krummwälden up to its confluence with the Fils near Eislingen. The hamlet Krummwälden, which was called in former times as "Welden," carried for some time the name of this river. It was changed to avoid ambiguity.

== Catchment area ==
The Krumm drains 30.0 km² at the middle Albtrauf southwest of the Fils. Its catchment area has roughly the shape of a parallelogram with a longer diagonal from northeast to southwest of about 10 km, perpendicular to it the maximum width reaches a little over 5 km. Its northwest corner lies on the 684.1 m tall Hohenstaufen, the northeastern one on Rechberg at an elevation of 707.9 m above sea level, the southeastern one at an unnamed, 564.6 m tall peak east of the Salacher Kapfhöfe, the southwestern one at the mouth (below 330 m ). The highest point is at the top of the Rechberg.

Beyond the well developed northern watershed between Hohenstaufen and Rechberg the left Rems tributaries Beutenbach, Tannbach and Tiefenbach compete with the Krumm. On the eastern, Rehgebirge, it is briefly the Waldstetter Bach at Rechberg, which also reaches the Rems via the Josefsbach, and then to the south-east corner of the Reichenbach, which, like all subsequent competitors, drains to the Fils. At this corner the Reichenbach receiving water Lauter itself is a short neighbour, in the whole remaining south and the southwest the Fils itself. In the northwest the border runs against the catchment area of the Marbach.

== See also ==
- List of rivers of Baden-Württemberg
