= Eichelbach (Baunach) =

River in Germany

Location
- Country: Germany
- State: Bavaria

Physical characteristics
- Mouth
  - location: Baunach
  - coordinates: 50.0841°N 10.7955°E

Eichelbach is a small river of Bavaria, Germany. It is a right tributary of the Baunach in the village Heubach of Ebern.

== See also ==
- List of rivers of Bavaria
