= Eislingen =

German city

- Town
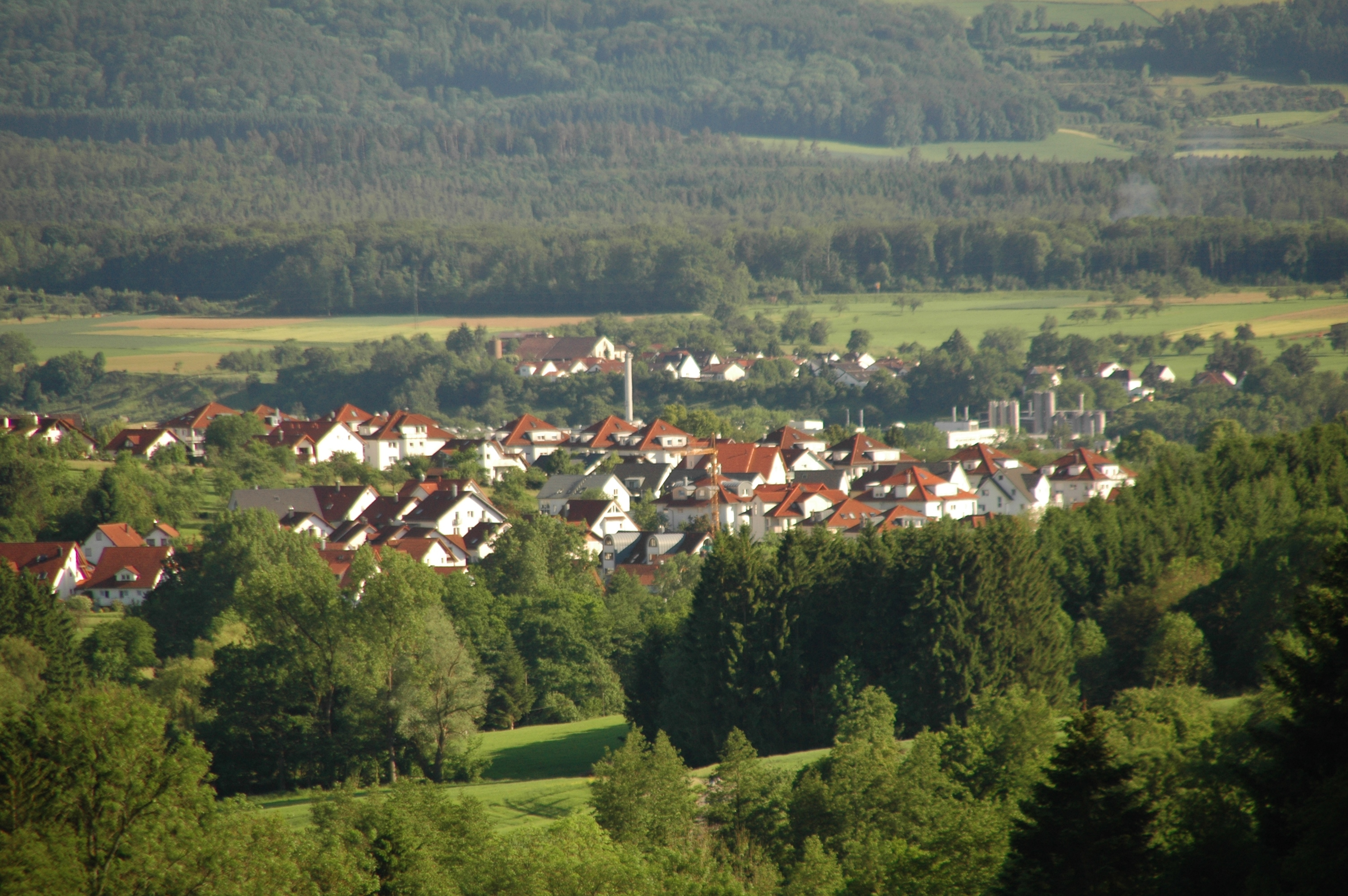
- View of Eislingen from the north

- Coat of arms

- Location of Eislingen within Göppingen district
- Interactive map of Eislingen
- Location within Germany Location within Baden-Württemberg
- Coordinates: 48°41′36″N 9°42′24″E
- Country: Germany
- State: Baden-Württemberg
- Admin. region: Stuttgart
- District: Göppingen

Government
  - Mayor (2018–26): Klaus Heininger (Ind.)

Area
  - Total: 16.41 km^{2} (6.34 sq mi)
- Elevation: 336 m (1,102 ft)

Population (2025-12-31)
  - Total: 22,168
  - Density: 1,351/km^{2} (3,499/sq mi)
- Time zone: UTC+01:00 (CET)
  - Summer (DST): UTC+02:00 (CEST)
- Postal codes: 73054
- Dialling codes: 07161
- Vehicle registration: GP
- Website: www.eislingen.de

Eislingen (German pronunciation: [ˈaɪslɪŋən]) is a town in the district of Göppingen in Baden-Württemberg, Germany.

== History ==
Southern Eislingen (Kleineislingen) became a possession Württemberg in 1492 while Northern Eislingen (Großeislingen) was annexed by the Prince-Bishopric of Würzburg. The period of municipal division brought about strife between local Imperial Knights (Reichsritter) until the dissolution of the Holy Roman Empire in 1803. The events of Protestant Reformation in Germany brought another third of Eislingen under the sovereignty of the Duchy of Württemberg and joint control with Würzburg with the rest of the city. In 1802, Würzburg was annexed by the Electorate of Bavaria. This, by extension, made Northern Eislingen a Bavarian possession until it was ceded in 1806 to the now Kingdom of Württemberg. Stuttgart assigned Eislingen to Oberamt Göppingen, a district was reorganized in 1938 as Landkreis Göppingen. Northern and Southern Eislingen united into a single city, named Eislingen-Fils, in 1933. The town of Krummwälden was incorporated into Eislingen in 1935. The construction of the Fils Valley Railway through Eislingen in 1845 began a period of industrialization and population expansion that continued after World War II and would make Eislingen the most densely populated municipality in Göppingen's jurisdiction. Eislingen was declared a major town, or Große Kreisstadt, in 2012.

== Geography ==
The city (Stadt) of Eislingen is located in the north of the district of Göppingen, in the German state of Baden-Württemberg. Eislingen is physically located in the Fils river valley, at the mouth of the Krumm, in the central and eastern foothills of the Swabian Jura. Elevation above sea level in the municipal area ranges from a high of 479 meters (1,572 ft) Normalnull (NN), in the northeast, to a low of 324 meters (1,063 ft) NN on the Fils.

== Politics ==
Eislingen has one borough (Stadtteile), Eislingen-Fils, and five villages: Eschenbäche, Etzberg, Krummwälden, Stumpenhof, and Täleshof. There are three abandoned villages in the municipal area: Brunnenweiler, Ehrenstetten, and Hammertweil.

=== Coat of arms ===
Eislingen's coat of arms is divided party per cross into four sections, two white and two blue. In the upper half of the blazon is a stag antler that alternates between white and blue as it crosses into different fields. This pattern was the coat of arms of Northern Eislingen and it was re-adopted by the city of Eislingen when it merged with Southern Eislingen in 1933. The blue-white tincture is a reference to the Prince-Bishopric of Würzburg, and the stag antler to Württemberg. The stag antler was black until 1955.

=== Partner cities ===
- Villány, Hungary, since April 1989
- Oyonnax, France, since 17 December 2001

== Transportation ==
Eislingen is connected to Germany's network of roadways by Bundesstraße 10, specifically a four-lane extension of the highway that was completed in 2006. The city is also connected to Germany's system of railroads by the Fils Valley Railway. Local public transportation is provided by the Verkehrsgemeinschaft Stauferkreis and Regional Bus Stuttgart.
