= Lauter (Baunach) =

River in Bavaria, Germany

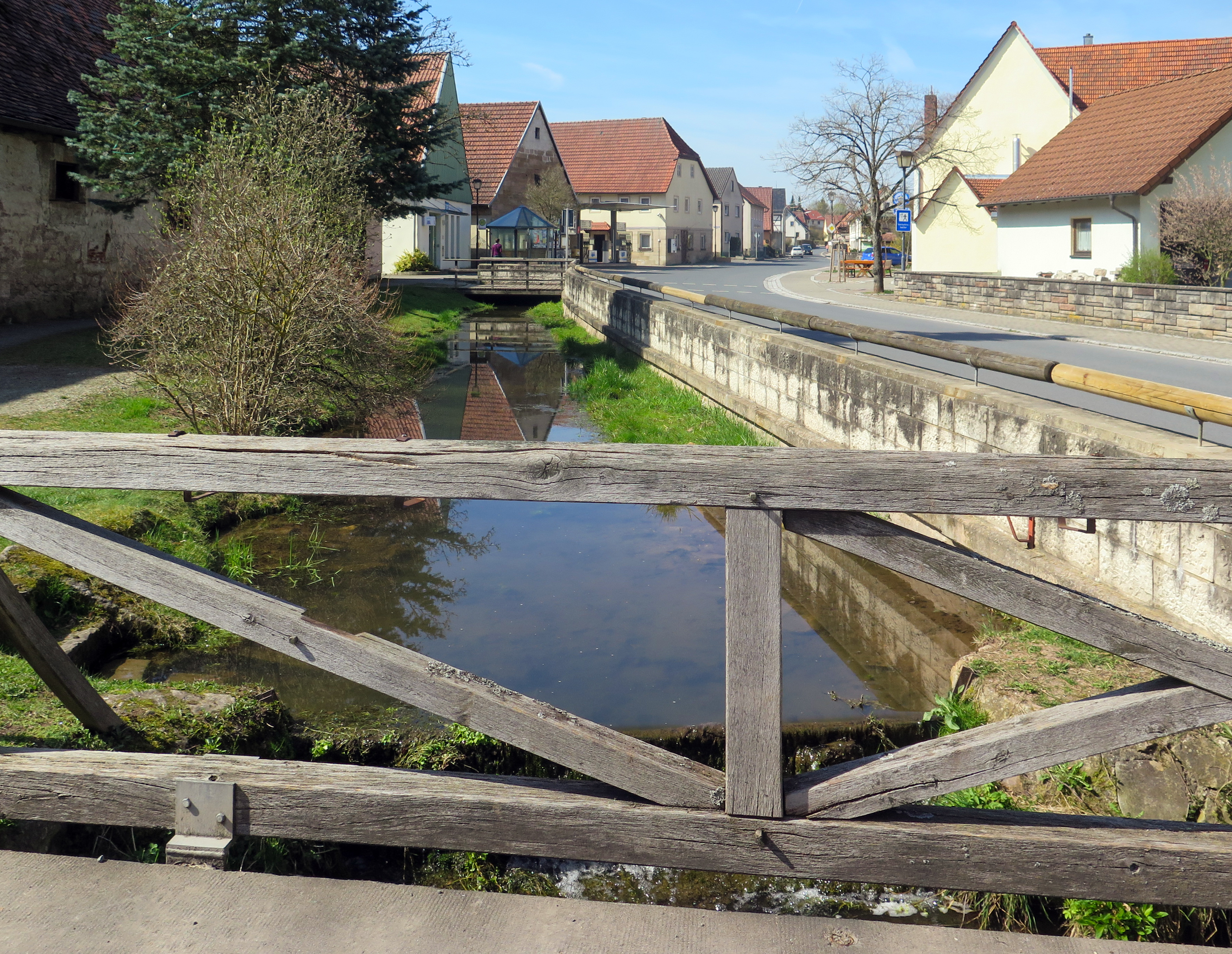
- The Lauter in Kirchlauter

Location
- Country: Germany
- State: Bavaria

Physical characteristics
- Mouth
  - location: Baunach
  - coordinates: 49°59′05″N 10°51′13″E
- Length: 21.3 km (13.2 mi)

Basin features
- Progression: Baunach→ Main→ Rhine→ North Sea

Lauter (German pronunciation: [ˈlaʊtɐ]) is a river of Bavaria, Germany. It is a right tributary of the Baunach in the town Baunach.

== See also ==
- List of rivers of Bavaria
