= Buchenbach (Lauter) =

River in Baden-Württemberg, Germany

Location
- Country: Germany
- State: Baden-Württemberg

Physical characteristics
- Mouth
  - location: Lauter
  - coordinates: 49.0603°N 9.4336°E

Basin features
- Progression: Lauter→ Murr→ Neckar→ Rhine→ North Sea

The Buchenbach is a small river in Baden-Württemberg, Germany. It flows into the Lauter in Neulautern (a part of Wüstenrot).

== See also ==
- List of rivers of Baden-Württemberg
