= Federation of Austrian Industries =

The Federation of Austrian Industries (de: Industriellenvereinigung, or IV for short) is the voluntary and independent body representing the interests of Austrian industry and its related sectors. The IV maintains a wide network of contacts and relations and has an office in Brussels. As a lobbying organisation, it pursues its goals and represents the interests of its members in Austria as well as on a European level. It currently has more than 4,400 members. Georg Knill, the managing shareholder of the Knill Group and president and chairman of Rosendahl Nextrom, is its president.

The IV was co-founded in 1946 by Hans Lauda, who served as the organisation's president from 1946-1960.
