= Nassach (Fils) =

River in Germany

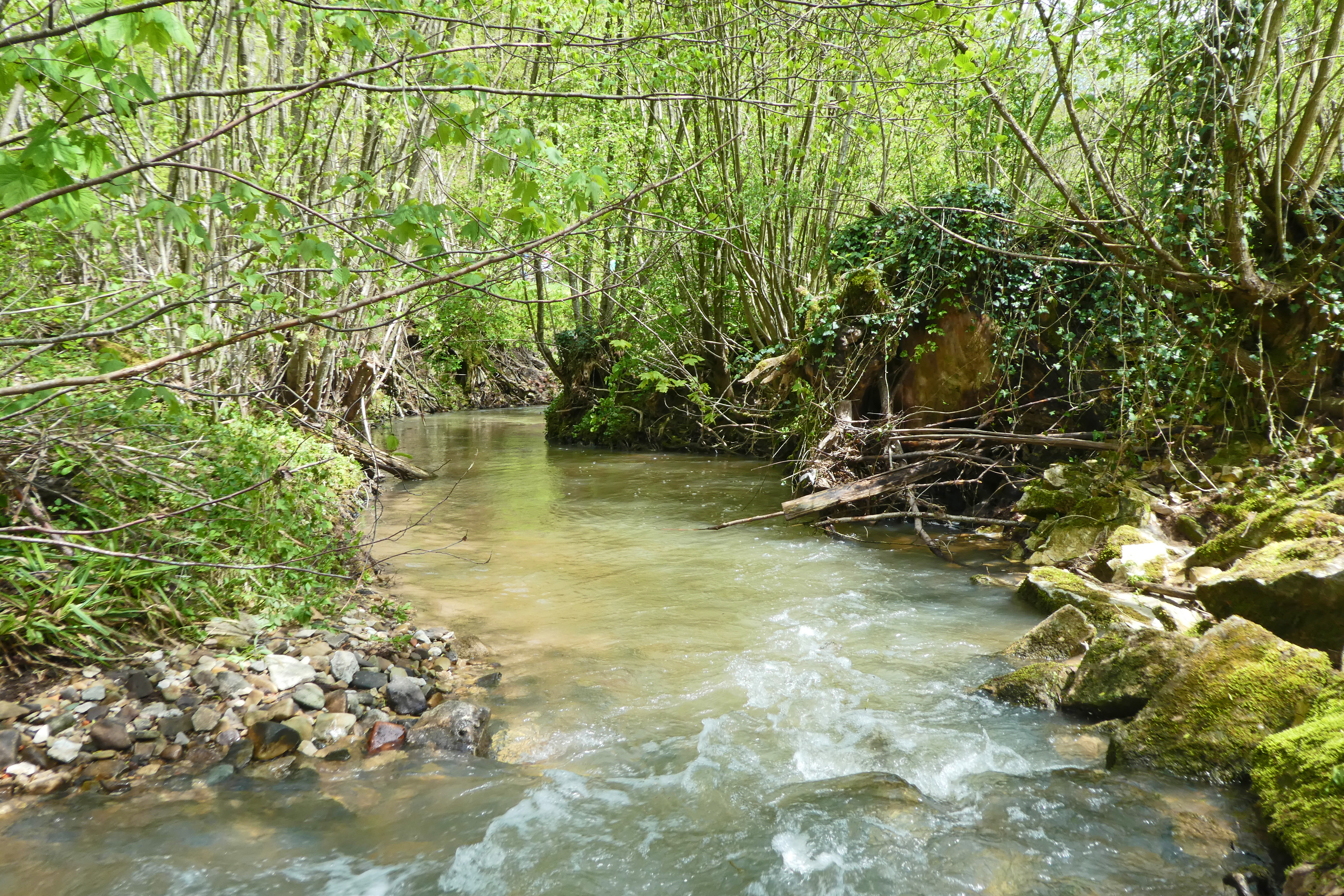

Location
- Country: Germany
- State: Baden-Württemberg

Physical characteristics
- Mouth
  - location: Fils
  - coordinates: 48.7155°N 9.5569°E

Basin features
- Progression: Fils→ Neckar→ Rhine→ North Sea

Nassach is a river of Baden-Württemberg, Germany.

Its upstream is called Lochbach. It is a right tributary of the Fils near Uhingen.

== See also ==
- List of rivers of Baden-Württemberg
