= Hans Lauda =

Austrian industrialist (1896–1974)

- Lauda in 1954
- Born: 25 March 1896; Vienna, Austria-Hungary
- Died: 21 January 1974 (aged 77); Vienna, Austria
- Education: Theresianum; University of Vienna
- Occupation: Industrialist
- Years active: 1923–1960
- Known for: President of Federation of Austrian Industries
- Father: Ernst Lauda

Hans Lauda (25 March 1896 – 21 January 1974) was an Austrian industrialist who co-founded the Federation of Austrian Industries and served as president from 1946 to 1960. He was the paternal grandfather of Formula One World Champion Niki Lauda.

== Early life ==
Hans Lauda was born on 25 March 1896 in Vienna. His father Ernst Lauda worked in hydraulic engineering and bridge construction. Lauda studied at the Theresianum, and the University of Vienna, where he earned a doctorate in law. He was known as "Old Lauda". He was interested in Formula One, and drove to the Nürburgring and to Monaco to watch Formula One races.

== Career ==
During the First World War, Lauda served in the Austrian artillery. After the war, he worked for Veitscher as a commercial secretary, between 1923 and 1925. He then worked for Österreichisch-Amerikanischen Magnesit AG. In 1937, he became the general manager of Veitscher. After the Anschluss, Lauda was removed from his position in the company. After the Second World War, Lauda was reinstated as general manager of Veitscher, and Lauda built a papermaking empire there.

In 1946, Lauda co-founded the Federation of Austrian Industries (IV), and was president of the organisation until 1960. In 1949, he was cited in a New York Times report on the progress of the Marshall Plan. He reported that Austria would employ 20,000 former government officials. He served as chairman of the Association of Industrialists, and in 1951, he proposed a successful bill to freeze wages, to try and counteract inflation in the country. In this role, Lauda was sceptical of the European Free Trade Association, of which Austria was one of the seven founding members. Lauda saw EFTA as an interim measure. Lauda was also a president of the Austrian Red Cross, from 1956 to 1974.

== Relationship with Niki Lauda ==
Hans Lauda was the paternal grandfather of Formula One World Champion Niki Lauda. Aged 10, Niki accused Hans of "double standards" after he accepted a medal of honour from socialist mayor of Vienna Felix Slavik, someone that Hans was not fond of. Hans was critical of Niki's Formula One ambitions, saying that "A Lauda should be on the economic pages of the newspaper, not the sports pages."

In 1971, Hans and Niki Lauda had an argument, after Hans vetoed funding for Niki to pay for a drive in the 1972 Formula One season with March Engineering. The pair never spoke again. Hans Lauda died in 1974, roughly three months before Niki's first Formula One victory at the 1974 Spanish Grand Prix.

In the 2013 biographical sports film Rush, Hans Lauda is portrayed by German actor Hans-Eckart Eckhardt in a supporting role as "Grandfather Lauda", rejecting Niki's Formula One ambitions in dialogue. His first name is not mentioned.
