= Eyb =

River in Germany

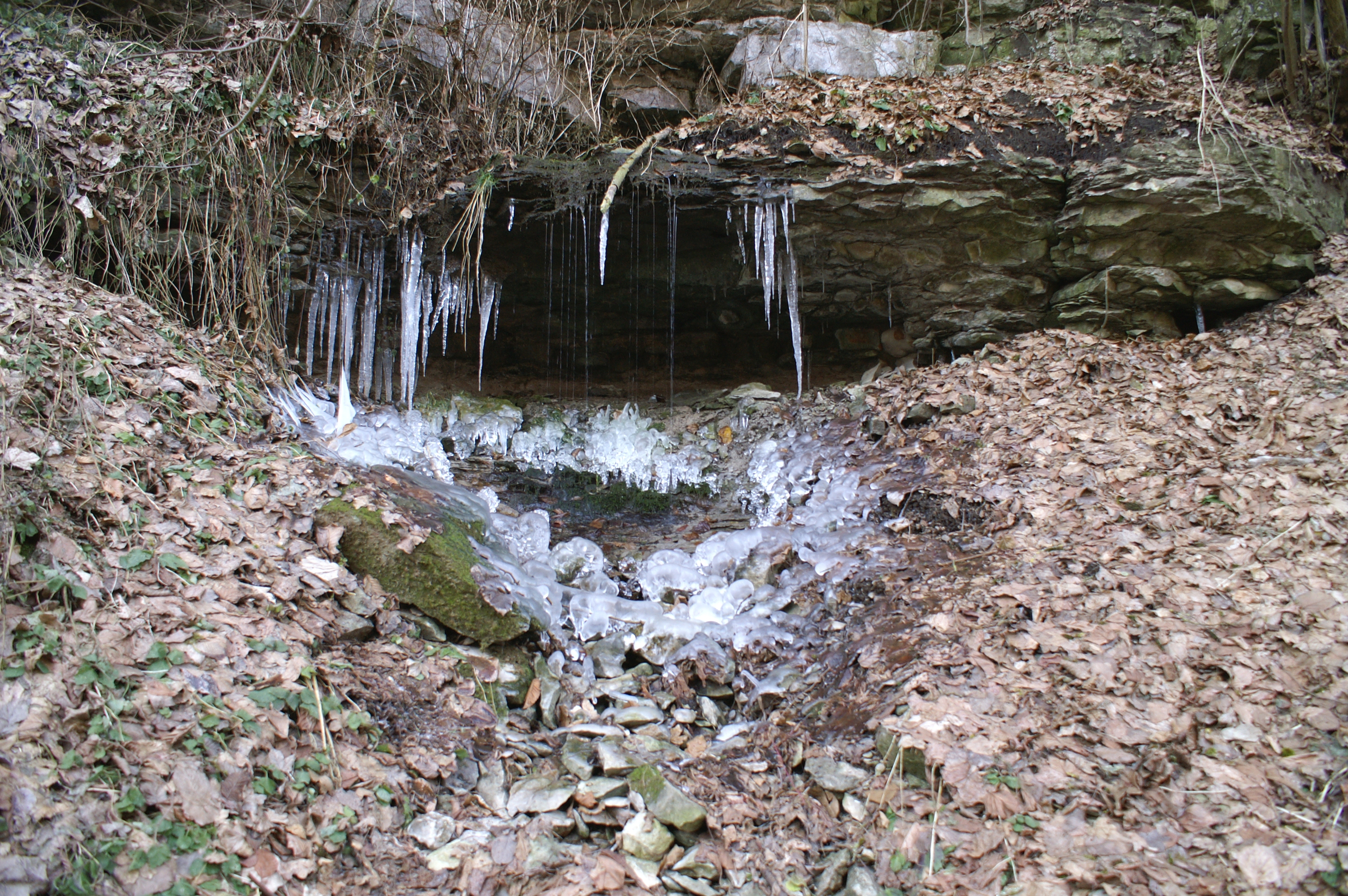

Location
- Country: Germany
- State: Baden-Württemberg

Physical characteristics
- Mouth
  - location: Fils
  - coordinates: 48.6296°N 9.8136°E
- Length: 12.8 km (8.0 mi)

Basin features
- Progression: Fils→ Neckar→ Rhine→ North Sea

Eyb is a river of Baden-Württemberg, Germany. It flows into the Fils in Geislingen an der Steige.

== See also ==
- List of rivers of Baden-Württemberg
