= Eichelbach (Weil) =

River in Germany

Location
- Country: Germany
- State: Hesse

Physical characteristics
- Mouth: Weil
  - coordinates: 50.3380°N 8.3826°E

Basin features
- Progression: Weil→ Lahn→ Rhine→ North Sea

Eichelbach is a small river of Hesse, Germany. It is a right tributary of the Weil in the village Rod an der Weil of Weilrod.

== See also ==
- List of rivers of Hesse
