= Ernst Lauda =

Austrian engineer (1859–1932)

- Ernst Lauda
- Born: Ernst Philipp Johann Lauda; 15 August 1859; Linz, Austrian Empire
- Died: 3 July 1932 (aged 72); Vienna, Austria
- Other name: Ernst Ritter von Lauda
- Education: Vienna University of Technology
- Children: Ernst Lauda; Hans Lauda
- Engineering career
- Discipline: Hydraulic; Bridge construction

Ernst Ritter von Lauda (born Ernst Philipp Johann Lauda, 15 August 1859 – 3 July 1932) was an Austrian hydraulic and bridge engineer who was an adviser to Emperor Franz Joseph I of Austria. He was awarded the Order of Franz Joseph and the second class of the Order of the Iron Crown and was given his own coat of arms.

== Personal life ==
Lauda was born on 15 August 1859 in Linz, Austria. His father, Adolf Lauda, was a director of the Empress Elisabeth Railway. From 1876 to 1882, Lauda studied engineering at the Vienna University of Technology. He was the father of physician Ernst Lauda and industrialist Hans Lauda, and the great-grandfather of Formula One world champion Niki Lauda. Lauda died in 1932 in Vienna, Austria.

== Career ==
Ernst Lauda's coat of arms from 1916 onwards

Lauda worked as a civil servant. From 1881 to 1884, he worked on civil engineering and bridge construction. He started out repairing the Stein-Mautern bridge that crosses the Danube river, as well as bridges across the Vltava river.

In 1895, Lauda was appointed to the Board of Directors of the Hydrographic Central Office in Vienna. In 1909, Lauda became head of the hydraulic engineering department at the Ministry of Public Works. In his role, he helped regulate the Danube river, which was prone to flooding. Lauda blamed the flooding on increased deforestation around the Danube river, and the issue of deforestation around the Danube and the Seine were discussed at the 1909 International Congress of Navigation. Ernst's great-grandson Niki Lauda said that Ernst's work on the Danube was the main reason why he was given heraldic honours.

From 1915 to 1916, Lauda was President of the Austrian Association of Engineers and Architects, and from 1917 to 1918, he focused on repairing buildings damaged during the First World War. Lauda retired as an engineer in 1918, although he still gave occasional lectures at the Vienna University of Technology in the 1920s.

== Honours ==
In 1892, Lauda became a knight of the Order of Franz Joseph. In 1914, he was awarded the second class of the Order of the Iron Crown. In May 1916, Emperor Franz Joseph I of Austria promised Lauda his own coat of arms. Franz Joseph I died a few months later, so the coat of arms was signed off by his successor, Charles I of Austria. In 1917, Lauda also received a knighthood, and an honorary doctorate from the Vienna University of Technology.
