= Baunach (river) =

River in Germany

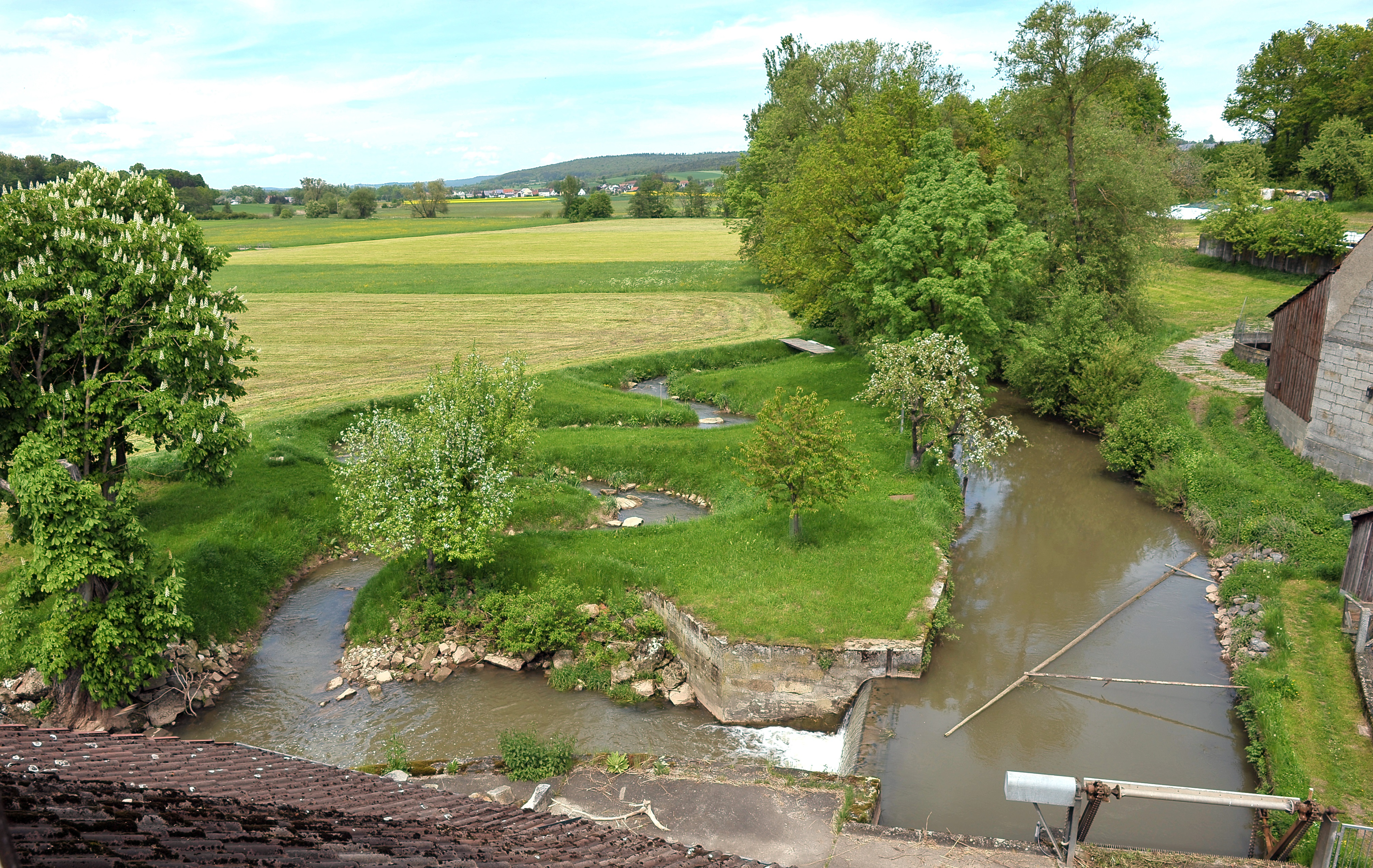
- The Baunach with weir and fish ladder near Gräfenholz (a part of Rentweinsdorf)

Location
- Country: Germany
- State: Bavaria

Physical characteristics
- Mouth
  - location: Main
  - coordinates: 49.9776°N 10.8571°E
- Length: 65.5 km (40.7 mi)
- Basin size: 426 km^{2} (164 sq mi)

Basin features
- Progression: Main→ Rhine→ North Sea

Baunach (German pronunciation: [ˈbaʊnax]) is a river of Bavaria, Germany. It flows into the Main in the town Baunach.

== See also ==
- List of rivers of Bavaria
