= Spiegelberg =

German municipality

- Municipality
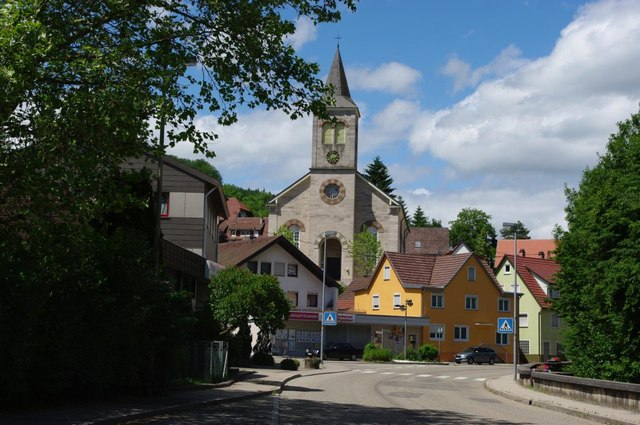
- Spiegelberg, June 2013

- Coat of arms

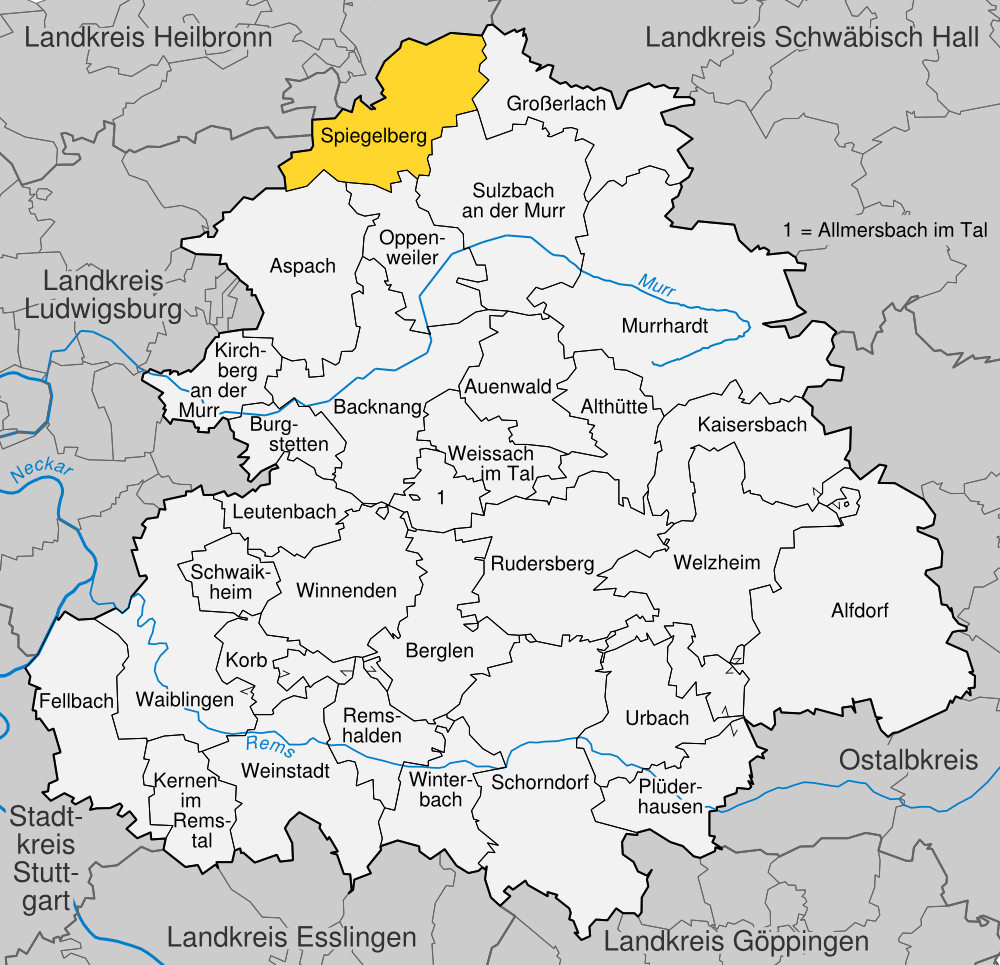
- Location of Spiegelberg within Rems-Murr-Kreis district
- Interactive map of Spiegelberg
- Location within Germany Location within Baden-Württemberg
- Coordinates: 49°02′15″N 09°26′45″E
- Country: Germany
- State: Baden-Württemberg
- Admin. region: Stuttgart
- District: Rems-Murr-Kreis

Government
  - Mayor (2023–31)

Area
  - Total: 28.22 km^{2} (10.90 sq mi)
- Elevation: 383 m (1,257 ft)

Population (2025-12-31)
  - Total: 2,126
  - Density: 75.34/km^{2} (195.1/sq mi)
- Time zone: UTC+01:00 (CET)
  - Summer (DST): UTC+02:00 (CEST)
- Postal codes: 71579
- Dialling codes: 07194
- Vehicle registration: WN
- Website: www.gemeinde-spiegelberg.de

Spiegelberg is a municipality in the Rems-Murr district of Baden-Württemberg, Germany.

== History ==
Spiegelberg's name originates from a glassworking manufactory built in 1699-1700 that produced mirrors from 1705 to 1794. The municipality started with the borough Jux, but was renamed by Eberhard Louis to Spiegelberg. The history of Jux is believed to date back to Roman times, though historical evidence is lacking to prove this claim. The name reappeared in 1700 and Jux continues to be one of 3 boroughs today. Other surrounding villages and communities date back to the 11th century.

Until 1797, Spiegelberg fell under the district of Oberamt Marbach, alongside Jux and Roßstaig. In 1807, the municipality was integrated into the district of Oberamt Backnang, and starting in 1938, following a district reform, it fell under Landkreis Backnang. Another reform in 1973 led to the integration into Rems-Murr district.

=== Coat of arms ===
Spiegelberg's municipal coat of arms is divided party per pale into a left, yellow half and a right, green half. Alternating between these two colors is a three-leaved oak shrub rooted to a three-pointed mountain. The current version of the coat of arms was officially assigned to the municipality in 1981, but the design originated in 1958.

== Geography ==
=== Location ===
The municipality (Gemeinde) of Spiegelberg is located at the northern edge of the Rems-Murr district of Baden-Württemberg, along its border with the district of Heilbronn. Spiegelberg is situated in the valley of the Lauter and within the Swabian-Franconian Forest. Elevation above sea level in the municipal area ranges from a high of 566 meters (1,857 ft) Normalnull (NN) to a low of 291 meters (955 ft) NN.

A portion of the Federally protected Bodenbach gorge nature reserve is located in Spiegelberg's municipal area.

=== Municipality breakdown ===
Spiegelberg has three boroughs (Ortsteile) – Jux, Nassach, and Spiegelberg – and ten villages: Dauernberg, Eisenlautern, Gieshof, Großhöchberg, Hüttlen, Kurzach, Neuhöchberg, Obere Roßstaig, Roßsteig, and Vorderbüchelberg. The industrial district of Roßstaig and the abandoned villages of Glashausen and Lassweiler are also located in the municipal area.

== Transportation ==
Spiegelberg is connected to Germany's network of roadways by its local Landesstraßen and Kreisstraßen. Local public transportation is provided by the Verkehrs- und Tarifverbund Stuttgart.

== Tourism and Culture ==
Spielberg is located on a scenic route. Tourist attractions include hiking and mountain biking trails, as well as some local venues for performances in the village of Großhöchberg.
