= Fils (river) =

River in Germany

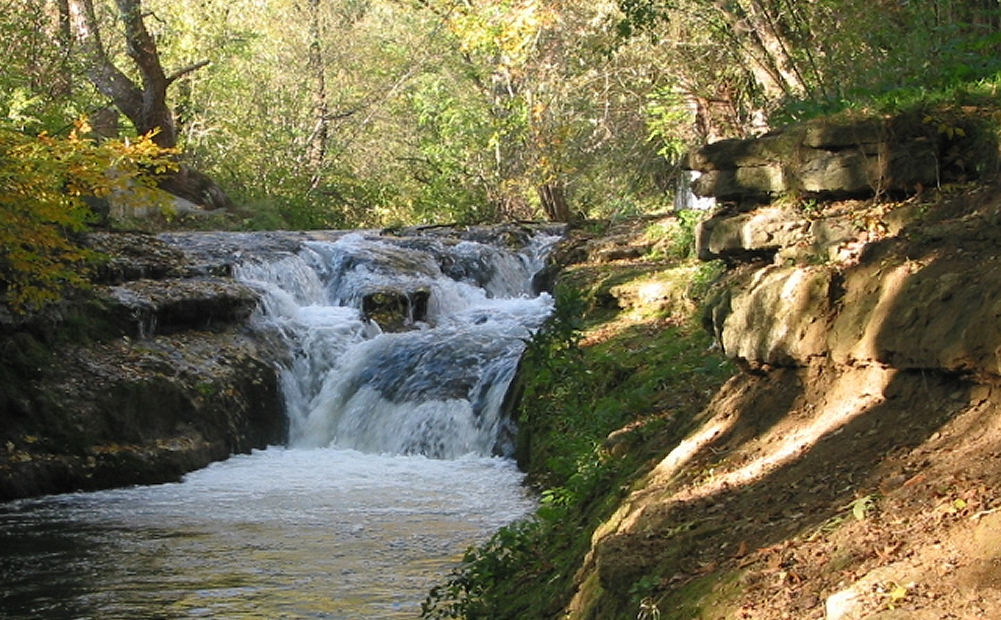

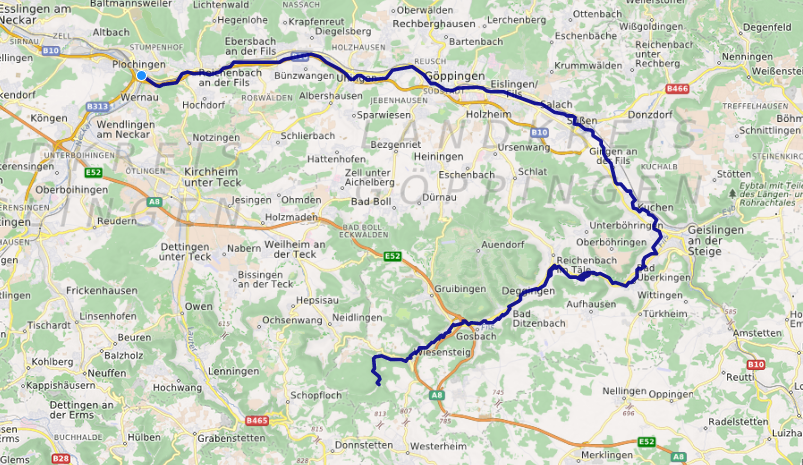

Location
- Country: Germany

Physical characteristics
- Source
  - location: Swabian Alb
- Mouth
  - location: Neckar
  - coordinates: 48°42′23″N 9°25′13″E
- Length: 62.9 km (39.1 mi)
- Basin size: 699 km^{2} (270 sq mi)

Basin features
- Progression: Neckar→ Rhine→ North Sea
- Tributaries
  - right: Eyb, Lauter

The Fils (German pronunciation: [fɪls]) is a 63-kilometre-long (39 mi) river in Baden-Württemberg, Germany, a right tributary of the Neckar.

Its source is in the Swabian Alb hills near Wiesensteig. It flows through Geislingen (Steige) and Göppingen to join the Neckar east of Stuttgart, in Plochingen. Due to the contribution of the Fils, the Neckar is navigable from there.

== Geography ==
=== Course ===
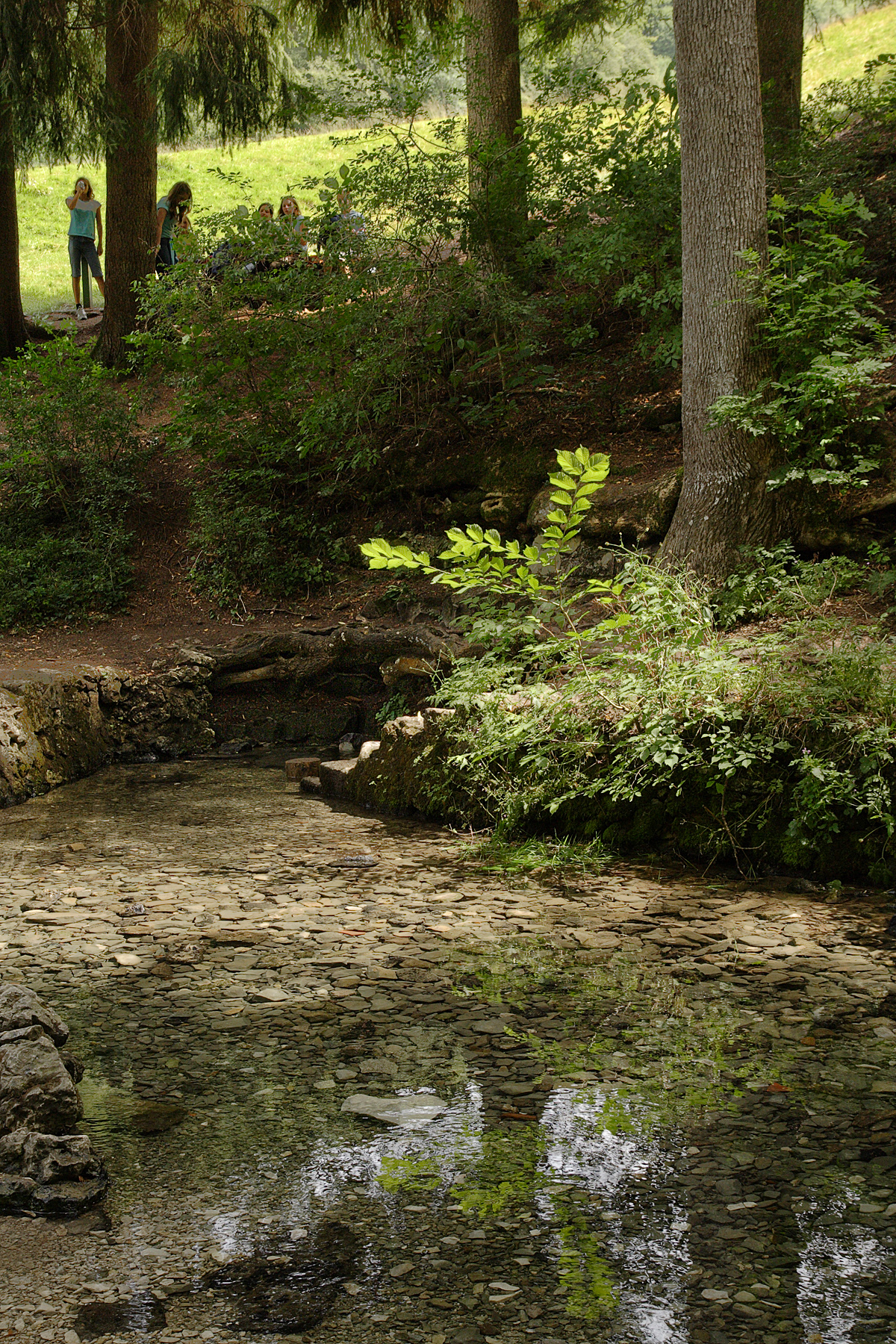
The origin of the Fils in the Hasental valley

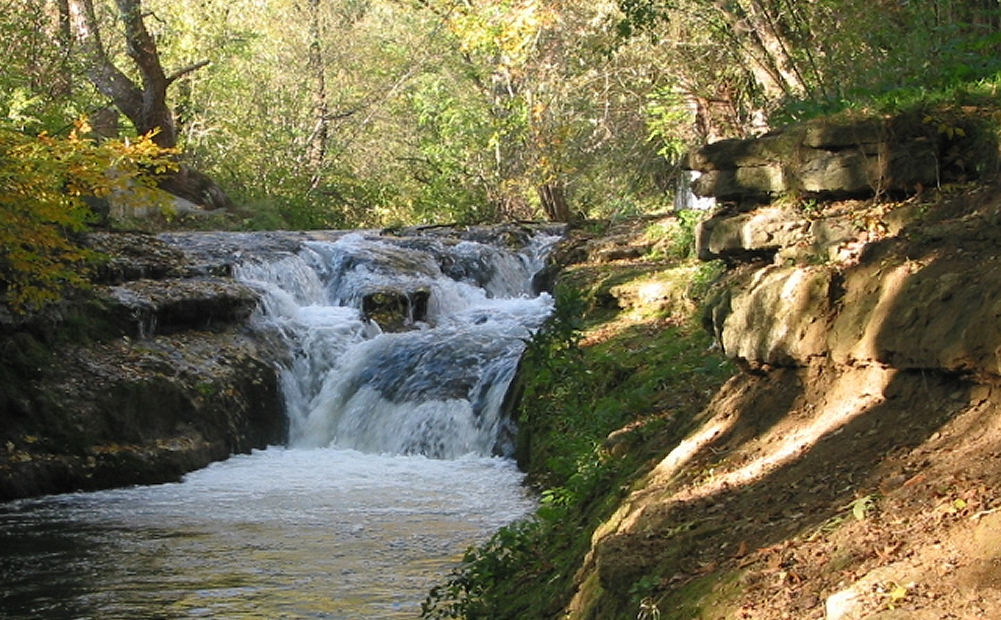
The Filswasserfall in Geislingen on the Steige

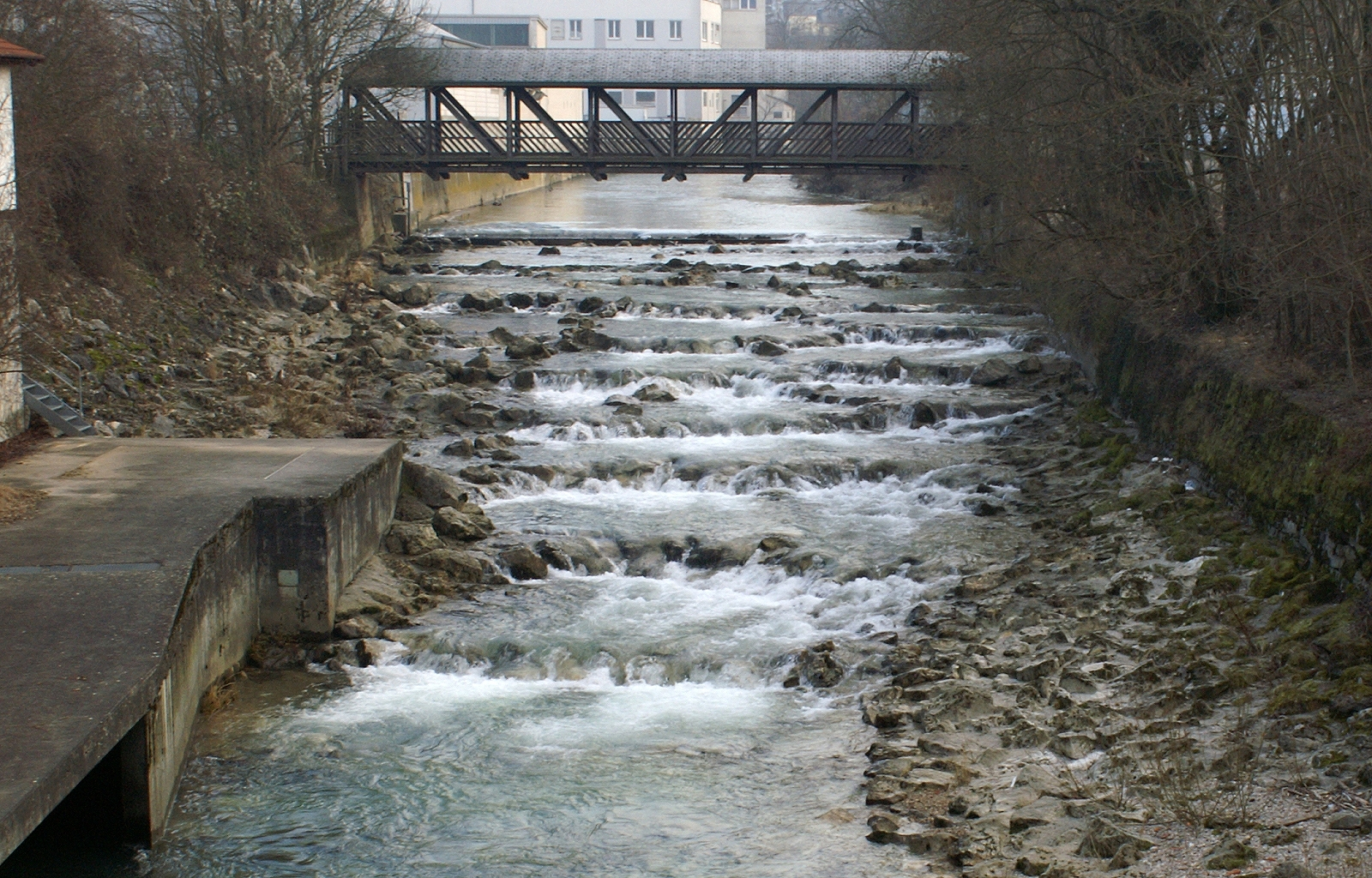
Hydropower plant on the Fils in Göppingen

The Fils has its source on the Swabian Alb about two kilometers southwest of the town Wiesensteig. Its karst spring, the Filsursprung, lies at 624.9 m in the Hasental valley, which has remained close to nature. There are two more springs a little further down, the Kleiner Filsursprung on the right and the Hasenquelle on the left at the foot of the slope.

The young river - initially running in a north-easterly direction - crosses the community Mühlhausen im Täle after Wiesensteig, where the Hollbach flows on the left side and the Bundesautobahn 8 crosses the valley. Then follows Gosbach with the mouth of the Gos on the right side. In Bad Ditzenbach the Hartel flows into the river from the left and the Ditz from the right. In Deggingen the longer Schinderbach flows into the Fils from the left and the short waters Sennenbach and Schüttebach from the right. At Reichenbach im Täle in its lowest valley the Fischbach and in Hausen an der Fils the Rohrbach flows into the Fils. In Bad Überkingen the Rötelbach coming from the right lets the Fils grow further. Through Geislingen an der Steige, the Filstal describes a 90 degree left turn, where the Eyb (river), which flows in from the northeast, joins in.

The Eyb is the first longer and on the surface also more catchment area-rich tributary from the right side, after the streams running in from the left from the crumbling inner side of the Alb Eaves have so far regularly exceeded their counterparts on the edge of the flat Alb plateau in both characteristics. The Eyb river absorbs a northwestern tributary from Amstetten before its mouth, which is why Geislingen lies in a wide valley spider. From now on, the Fils also runs in a northwesterly direction through its outlet bay from the Alb into the Swabian Keuper-Lias Plains, where Kuchen and then at the tributary of the Marrbach Gingen lie. In the meantime, before the Alb, the right Lauter, the largest tributary of the Fils at all, flows into Süßen on its last west-southwestern course. From here on the Fils runs approximately westward in a constantly increasing distance from the step edge of the Alb to its left, which is why from now on the left and right tributaries become more similar in length and catchment area.

In the now wide valley follow Salach, Eislingen with the Krumm from the right, the second largest tributary of the Fils, and the left Weilerbach, then Göppingen, Faurndau with the Marbach. (right), Uhingen with the Blaubach (right), the Butzbach (left) and the Nassach (right). The third last village at the river is Ebersbach an der Fils, where the name-giving Ebersbach flows in from the right as well as the following Kirnbach shortly before the community and district border to Reichenbach an der Fils. In this place Reichenbach and Lützelbach flow in from the right and finally the Talbach from the opposite side.

Thereupon the Fils reaches Plochingen, where it flows at 248.3 m after about 63 kilometres and almost 377 metres of altitude below its source from the right into the left curve of the Neckar there; it thus has a mean bottom gradient of about 6°. ‰. Its catchment area covers about 707 km^{2}. It is the fifth largest Neckar tributary by length and the fourth largest by catchment area.

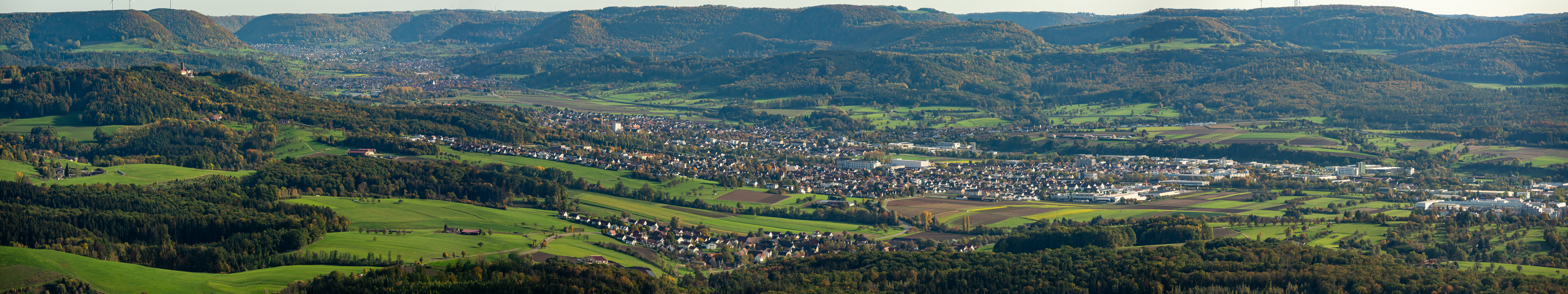
Filstal as seen from Hohenstaufen

=== Catchment area ===
The 707 km^{2} catchment area of the Fils is divided into a somewhat smaller southern part in the Swabian Alb and a somewhat larger northern part in the Alb foothills. At first, the river runs approximately east-northeast until its turning point from Geislingen through the Mittlere Kuppenalb and towards the end also has an inflow from the Albuch and Härtsfeld in the east. From Geislingen it turns slowly westwards and flows through the three subspaces Filsalbvorberge, Notzinger Platte and Schlierbacher Platte of the Middle Alb foothills, whereby then the right tributaries first drain the Rehgebirge of the Eastern Alb foothills and then the southern part of the Schurwaldes in the Swabian Keuper-Lias Land. A tiny gusset near the mouth near Plochingen lies in the Nürtinger-Esslinger Neckar Valley, a part of the Filder.

=== Tributaries ===
From Sourcce to Mussle, Tributaries longer than 5 km:

- Hohlbach, (left), 7,41 km
- Hartel, (left), 5,86 km
- Fischbach, (left), 5,177 km
- Rohrbach, (left), 5,228 km
- Eyb, (right), 12,786 km
- Lauter, (right), 16,36 km
- Schweinbach, (left), 6,423 km
- Krumm, (right), 12,619 km
- Weilerbach, (left), 9,473 km
- Heubach, (left), 10,946 km
- Marbach, (right), 13,171 km
- Pfuhlbach, (left), 12,561 km
- Butzbach (Fils), (left), 16,473 km
- Nassach, (right), 9,22 km
- Kirnbach, (right), 5,299 km
- Reichenbach, (right), 7,993 km
- Lützelbach, (right), 5,356 km
- Talbach, (left), 11,626 km
