= Bad Ditzenbach =

German municipality

- Municipality
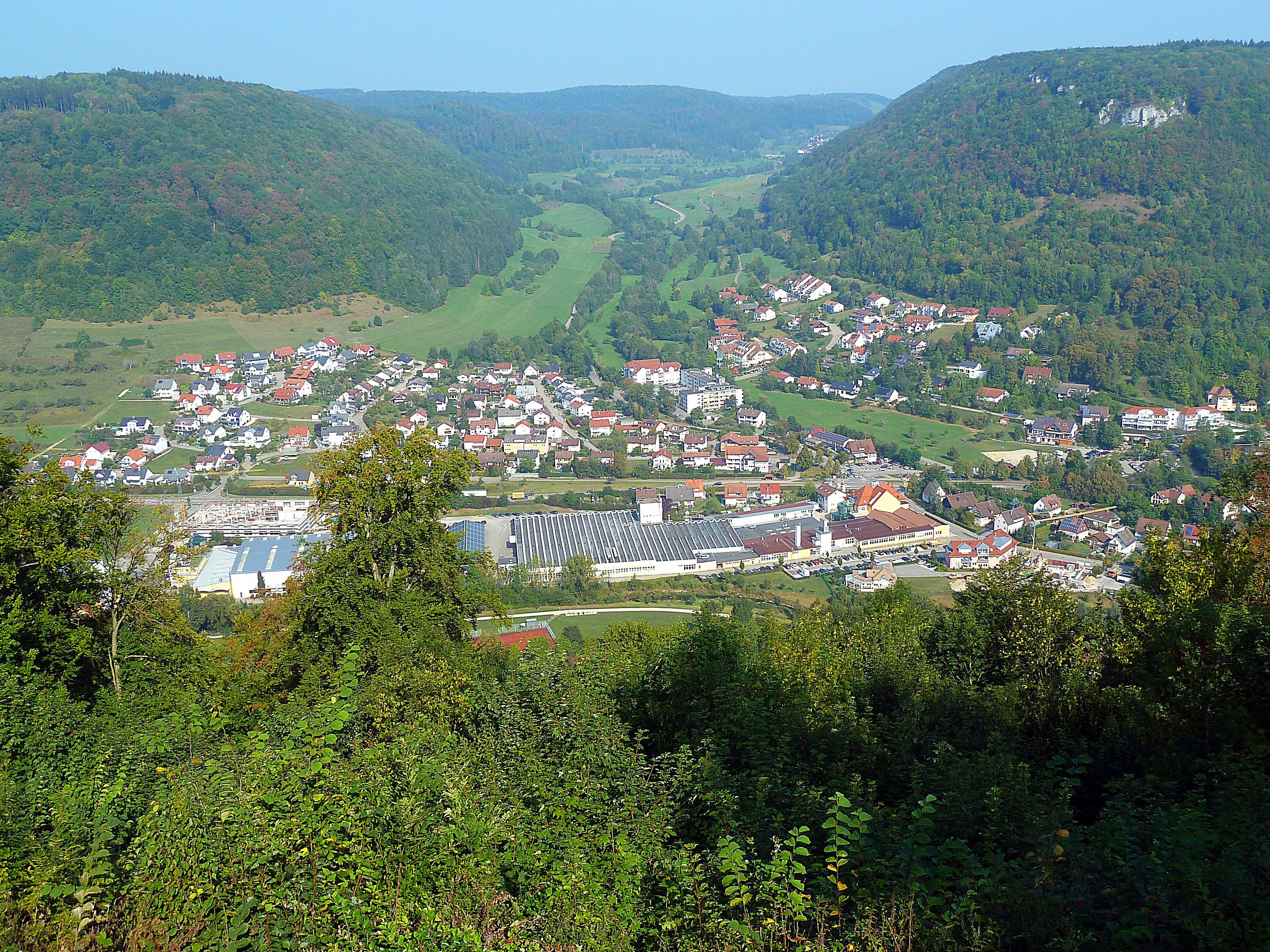
- View of Ditzenbach

- Coat of arms

- Location of Bad Ditzenbach within Göppingen district
- Interactive map of Bad Ditzenbach
- Location within Germany Location within Baden-Württemberg
- Coordinates: 48°35′9″N 9°41′31″E
- Country: Germany
- State: Baden-Württemberg
- Admin. region: Stuttgart
- District: Göppingen

Government
  - Mayor (2023–31): Herbert Juhn

Area
  - Total: 25.46 km^{2} (9.83 sq mi)
- Elevation: 509 m (1,670 ft)

Population (2025-12-31)
  - Total: 3,822
  - Density: 150.1/km^{2} (388.8/sq mi)
- Time zone: UTC+01:00 (CET)
  - Summer (DST): UTC+02:00 (CEST)
- Postal codes: 73342
- Dialling codes: 07334 Gosbach: 07335
- Vehicle registration: GP
- Website: www.bad-ditzenbach.de

Bad Ditzenbach (Swabian: Ditzebach) is a municipality in the district of Göppingen in Baden-Württemberg in southern Germany.

== History ==
The townships of Ditzenbach, Auendorf, and Gosbach were, until German mediatization in 1806, possessions of the House of Helfenstein. They were awarded to the Kingdom of Württemberg, a state that had come to control most of the surrounding territory between 1422 and 1455. The town was placed within Württemberg's administrative structure in Oberamt Wiesensteig until 1810, when it was transferred to Oberamt Geislingen. The nearby village of Auendorf had already mostly been a possession of Württemberg before mediatization. Auendorf and Gosbach were assigned to Oberamt Göppingen until transfer in 1808 to Oberamt Wiesensteig. Auendorf moved to Oberamt Göppingen in 1810 and in the same year Gosbach joined Ditzenbach in Oberamt Geislingen. The three townships were placed in the district of Göppingen in 1938. The three townships were merged into a new municipality, Bad Ditzenbach, on 1 January 1975.

=== Bad Ditzenbach ===
In 1560, a spa was built in the town on its mineral springs. It received the name Bad, "Spa", from the Weimar Republic in 1929.

== Geography ==
The municipality (Gemeinde) of Bad Ditzenbach is situated in the district of Göppingen, of the German state of Baden-Württemberg. Bad Ditzenbach lies along Göppingen's district border with the Alb-Danube district to the south. The municipal area is physically located in the Middle Kuppenalb. Elevation above sea level in the municipality ranges from a high of 777 meters (2,549 ft) Normalnull (NN) to a low of 465 meters (1,526 ft) NN along the Fils.

A portion of the Federally-protected Kaltes Feld mit Hornberg, Galgenberg und Eierberg is located in Bad Ditzenbach's municipal area.

== Politics ==
Bad Ditzenbach has three boroughs (Ortsteile): Auendorf, Bad Ditzenbach, and Gosbach. The municipality is in a municipal association (Verwaltungsgemeinschaft) with the neighboring municipality of Deggingen. Two abandoned villages, Hiltenburg and Leimberg, are found in Bad Ditzenbach's municipal area.

=== Coat of arms ===
The municipal coat of arms for Bad Ditzenbach displays a golden fountain with silver waters in front of a green, three-pointed hill that almost totally covers the field, also gold. The fountain is taken from the coat of arms of the town of Bad Ditzenbach, and the hill is a reference to the local terrain. The municipal coat of arms was approved by the Göppingen district office on 17 August 1977 and a corresponding flag issued.

== Transportation ==
Bad Ditzenbach is connected to Germany's network of roadways by Bundesautobahn 8, specifically its junction at Mühlhausen im Täle. Local public transportation is provided by the Verkehrsgemeinschaft Stauferkreis. From 1903 to 1968, the municipality was connected to Germany's railway to the Tälesbahn railroad.
