= Lauter (Fils) =

River of Baden-Württemberg, Germany

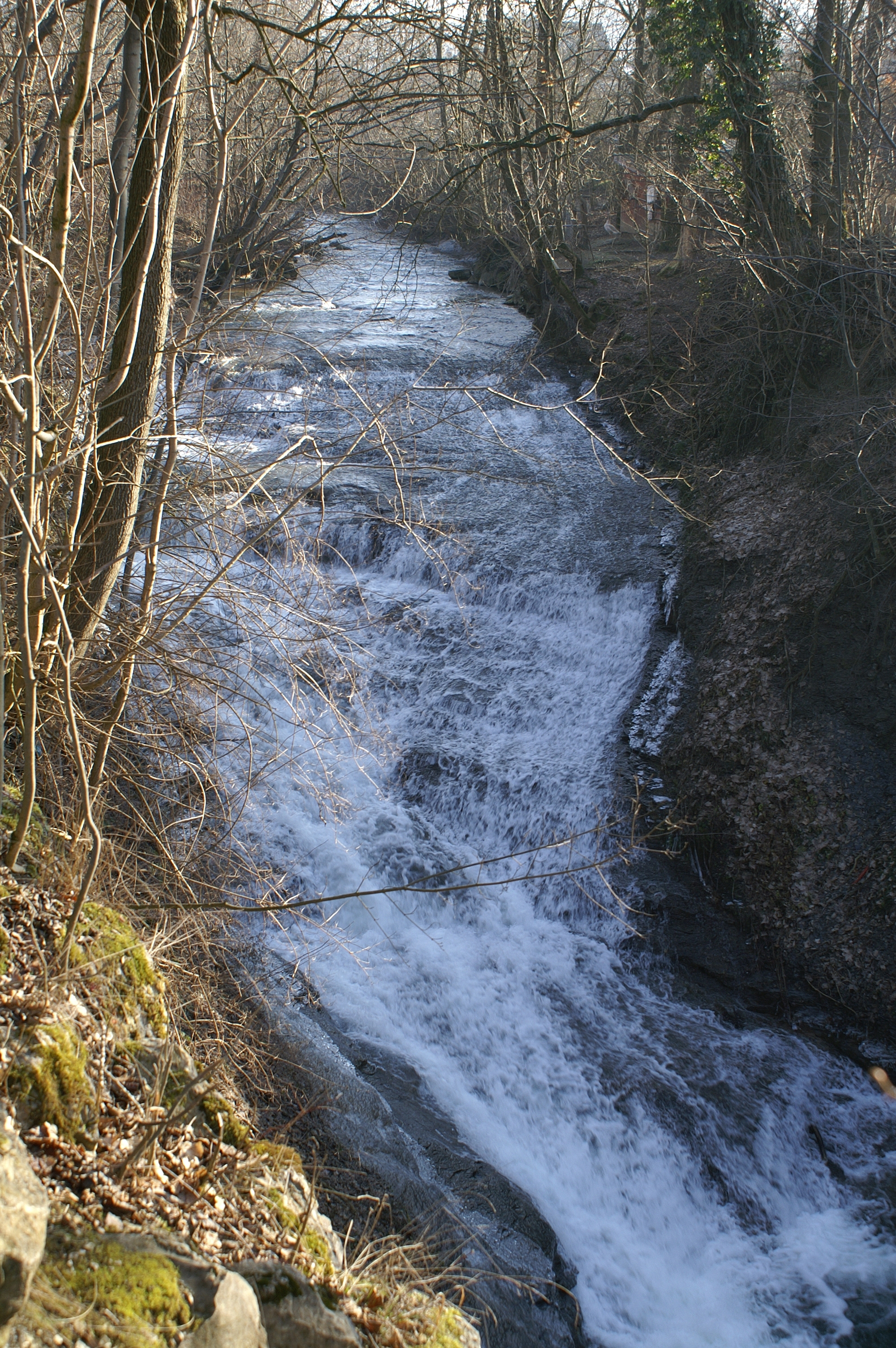
- Cascade in the Lauter

Location
- Country: Germany
- State: Baden-Württemberg

Physical characteristics
- Mouth
  - location: Fils
  - coordinates: 48.6785°N 9.7647°E
- Length: 16.4 km (10.2 mi)

Basin features
- Progression: Fils→ Neckar→ Rhine→ North Sea

Lauter (German pronunciation: [ˈlaʊtɐ]) is a river of Baden-Württemberg, Germany. It originates near Degenfeld. It is a right tributary of the Fils in Süßen.

== See also ==
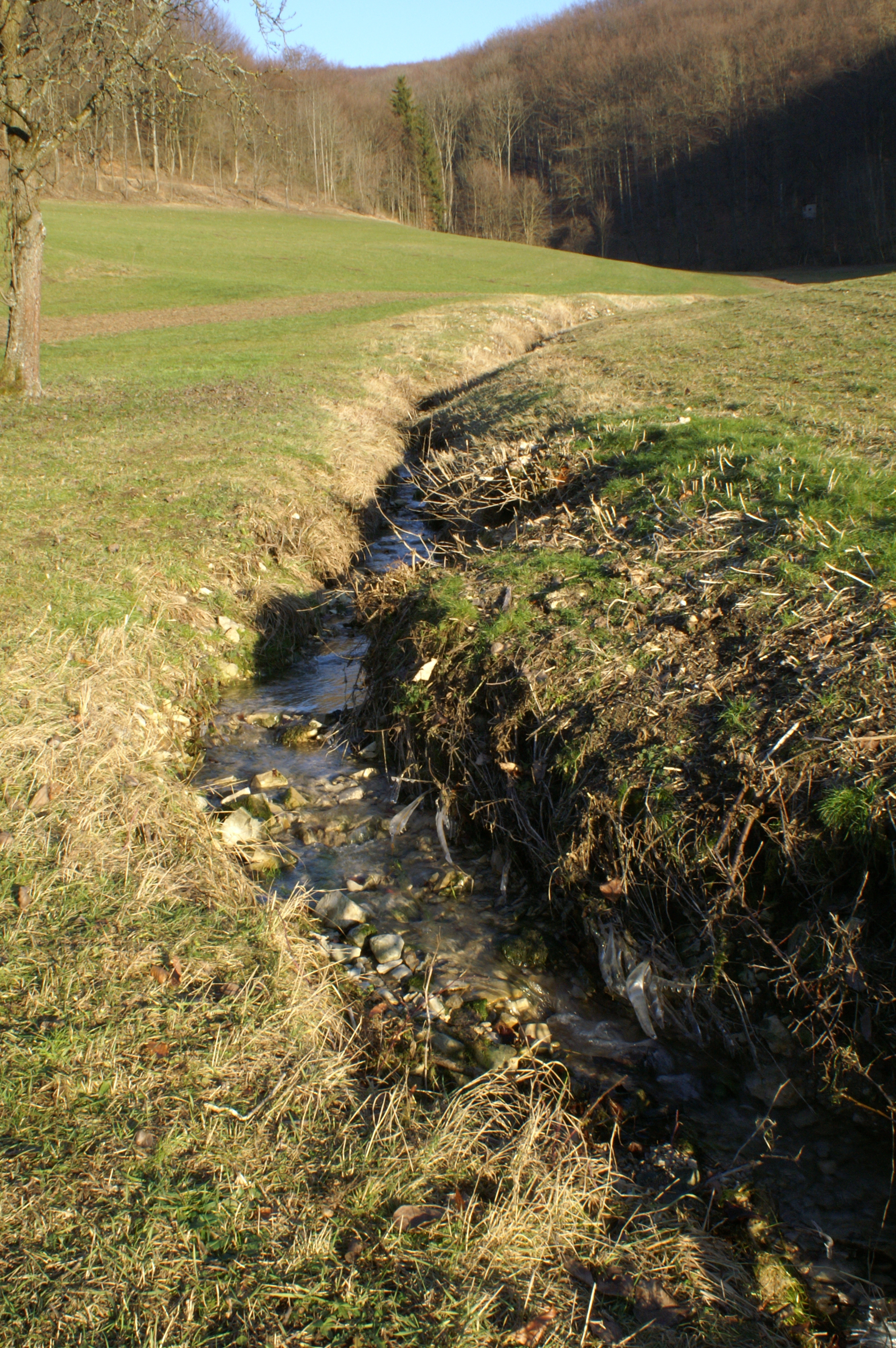
The Lauter at its source

- List of rivers of Baden-Württemberg
