= Lauter (Murr) =

River in Germany

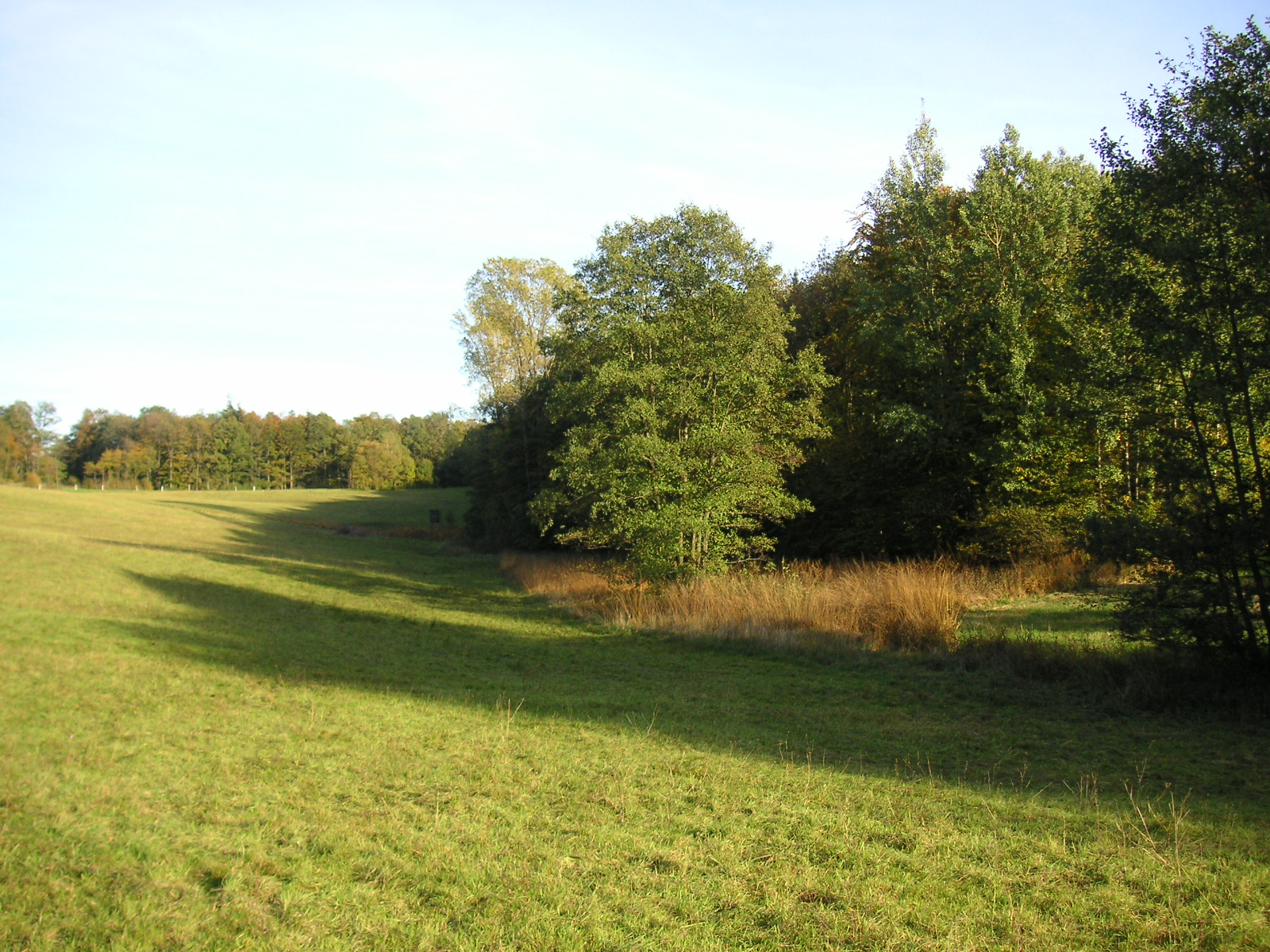

Location
- Country: Germany
- State: Baden-Württemberg

Physical characteristics
- Mouth
  - location: Murr
  - coordinates: 48.9981°N 9.4883°E
- Length: 15.6 km (9.7 mi)

Basin features
- Progression: Murr→ Neckar→ Rhine→ North Sea

The Lauter (German pronunciation: [ˈlaʊtɐ]) is a river in Baden-Württemberg, Germany. It passes through Spiegelberg and flows into the Murr near Sulzbach an der Murr.

== See also ==
- List of rivers of Baden-Württemberg
