= Rötelbach =

Rötelbach may refer to:

- Rötelbach (Danube), a river of Baden-Württemberg, Germany, tributary of the Danuber
- Rötelbach (Jagst), a river of Baden-Württemberg, Germany, tributary of the Jagst
