= Zipfelbach =

Zipfelbach may refer to:

- Zipfelbach (Lindach), a river of Baden-Württemberg, Germany, tributary of the Lindach
- Zipfelbach (Neckar), a river of Baden-Württemberg, Germany, tributary of the Neckar
