= Dentelbach =

Dentelbach may refer to:

- Dentelbach (Steinach), a river of Baden-Württemberg, Germany, tributary of the Steinach
- Dentelbach (Murr), a river of Baden-Württemberg, Germany, tributary of the Murr
