= Arbach (disambiguation) =

Arbach is a municipality in Rhineland-Palatinate, Germany.

Arbach may also refer to:

- Arbach (Wildenbach), a river of North Rhine-Westphalia, Germany, tributary of the Wildenbach
- Arbach (Neckar), a river of Baden-Württemberg, Germany, tributary of the Neckar
- Arbach (Swabian Rezat), a river of Bavaria, Germany, tributary of the Swabian Rezat
- Jean-Abdo Arbach (born 1952), current archeparch of the Melkite Greek Catholic Archeparchy of Homs, Hama and Yabroud
