= Seckach (disambiguation) =

Seckach is a village and a municipality in the district of Neckar-Odenwald-Kreis, in Baden-Württemberg, Germany.

Seckach may also refer to:

- Seckach (Lauchert), a river of Baden-Württemberg, Germany, tributary of the Lauchert
- Seckach (Jagst), a river of Baden-Württemberg, Germany, tributary of the Jagst
- SC Klinge Seckach, a German women's football club based in Seckach
