= List of rivers of Baden-Württemberg =

A list of rivers of Baden-Württemberg, Germany:

== A ==
- Aal
- Aalbach
- Aalenbach
- Ablach
- Ach
- Acher
- Adelbach
- Aich
- Aid
- Aischbach, tributary of the Kinzig
- Aischbach, tributary of the Körsch
- Aitrach, tributary of the Danube
- Aitrach, tributary of the Iller
- Alb, tributary of the Rhine at Eggenstein-Leopoldshafen
- Alb, tributary of the Rhine at Albbruck
- Ammer
- Amorsbach
- Andelsbach
- Annenbach
- Arbach
- Argen
- Aschenbach
- Aspenbach
- Avenbach

== B ==
- Badische Eschach
- Bära
- Bellamonter Rottum
- Berneck
- Biber
- Biberbach
- Bibers
- Black Kocher
- Black Lauter
- Blau
- Blinde Rot
- Bollenbach
- Bottwar
- Braunsel
- Breg
- Brehmbach
- Breitenbach
- Brenz
- Brettach, tributary of the Jagst
- Brettach, tributary of the Kocher
- Brigach
- Bronnbach
- Brotenaubach
- Brühlbach
- Brunnisach
- Buberlesbach
- Buchbach
- Buchenbach, tributary of the Lauter
- Buchenbach, tributary of the Murr
- Bühler
- Burraubach

== D ==
- Dammbach
- Dentelbach, tributary of the Murr
- Dentelbach, tributary of the Steinach
- Ditz
- Dollesbach
- Danube
- Donaubach
- Dreisam
- Dürnach
- Dürrbach
- Dürrenbach
- Dürreych

== E ==
- Echaz
- Egau
- Eger
- Eisbach
- Ellbach, tributary of the Kocher
- Ellbach, headstream of the Rot
- Ellbach, tributary of the Sulm
- Elsach
- Elsenz
- Elta
- Elz, tributary of the Neckar
- Elz, tributary of the Rhine
- Enz
- Epbach
- Erf
- Erlenbach, tributary of the Jagst
- Erlenbach, tributary of the Enz
- Erms
- Ernsbach, tributary of the Kocher
- Ernsbach, tributary of the Riedbach
- Erpf
- Württembergische Eschach
- Eschach, headwater of the Aitrach
- Eschach, tributary of the Neckar
- Eselbach
- Eselsbach
- Ette
- Ettenbach
- Eyach, tributary of the Enz
- Eyach, tributary of the Neckar
- Eyb

== F ==
- Faulenbach
- Federbach, tributary of the Alb
- Federbach, tributary of the Lindach
- Fehla
- Felbenbach
- Feuerbach
- Fils
- Finkenbach
- Fischach
- Fischbach, tributary of the Eschach
- Fischbach, tributary of the Seckach
- Flappach

== G ==
- Gauangelbach
- Gauchach
- Gillenbach
- Ginsbach
- Glatt
- Glems
- Glotter
- Goldbach
- Goldersbach
- Gos
- Göttelbach
- Götzenbrunnenbächle
- Grabenbach
- Gronach
- Große Enz
- Grünbach
- Grundbach
- Grundelbach
- Gruppenbach, tributary of the Bühler
- Gruppenbach, tributary of the Schozach
- Gutach

== H ==
- Hahnbach
- Harmersbach
- Hasenbach
- Haslach
- Heglach
- Heidelsgraben
- Heimbach
- Hergstbach
- Hergstgraben
- Herrgottsbach
- Heubach
- Hintere Breg
- Hirtenbach
- Hochrhein
- Höfelbach
- Höllbach
- Holzbach
- Hörschbach
- Hürbe

== I ==
- Ilgenbach
- Irsbach
- Itter
- Iller
- Itzelberg

== J ==
- Jagst

== K ==
- Kalte Riss
- Kaltenbach
- Kämpfelbach
- Kander
- Kanzach
- Kanzelbach
- Katzbach
- Katzenbach
- Kehlbach
- Kembach
- Kessach
- Kesselbach, tributary of the Danube
- Kesselbach, tributary of the Zwiefalter Aach
- Kinzig
- Kirbach
- Kirnach
- Kirnau
- Kirnbach, tributary of the Kinzig
- Kirnbach, tributary of the Schiltach
- Kleine Enz
- Kleine Kinzig
- Klemmbach
- Klingenbach, tributary of the Bühler
- Klingenbach, tributary of the Jagst
- Klingengraben
- Klöpferbach
- Klotzbach
- Knaupenbach
- Kocher
- Kochhart
- Kochklingenbach
- Körsch
- Kötach
- Kotbach
- Krähenbach
- Kraichbach
- Krebsbach, tributary of the Schwarzbach flowing into the Elsenz
- Krebsbach, tributary of the Würm
- Kreuzbach, tributary of the Strudelbach
- Kriegbach
- Krumm
- Krummbach, tributary of the Ablach
- Krummbach, tributary of the Dreisam
- Krummbach, tributary of the Steinhauser Rottum
- Kübelbach
- Kuhnbach
- Kunzenbach
- Kupfer

== L ==
- Langwatte
- Lanzenbach, tributary of the Bühler
- Lanzenbach, tributary of the Speltach
- Lauchert
- Lautenbach, tributary of the Ablach
- Lautenbach, tributary of the Linzer Aach
- Lauter, tributary of the Blau
- Lauter, tributary of the Danube
- Lauter, tributary of the Fils
- Lauter, tributary of the Murr
- Lauter, tributary of the Neckar
- Lauterbach
- Leimbach
- Lein, tributary of the Kocher
- Lein, tributary of the Neckar
- Leudelsbach
- Lierbach
- Lindach
- Lindenbach
- Linzer Aach
- Lobbach
- Lone

== M ==
- Main
- Maisenbach
- Maulach
- Mettenbach, tributary of the Grabenbach
- Mettenbach, tributary of the Erlenbach which is a tributary of the Enz
- Metter
- Mettma
- Metzgerbach
- Miesach
- Möhlin
- Monbach
- Moosalb
- Moosbach
- Muckenseebach
- Mud
- Mühlbach, tributary of the Fichtenberger Rot
- Mühlbach, tributary of the Schussen
- Murg, flows through the Northern Black Forest, tributary of the Upper Rhine
- Murg, flows through the Southern Black Forest, tributary of the High Rhine
- Murr

== N ==
- Nagold
- Nassach
- Nau
- Neckar
- Nesenbach
- Nesselbach, tributary of the Bühler
- Nesselbach, upper part of the Rombach
- Neumagen
- Nonnenbach

== O ==
- Obere Argen
- Obere Bära
- Ohrn
- Oos
- Ostrach
- Otterbach

== P ==
- Pfannenbach
- Pfedelbach
- Pfeffer
- Pfinz
- Pfostenbach
- Pfühlbach
- Prim

== R ==
- Radolfzeller Aach
- Rankbach
- Rauentalbach
- Rechenberger Rot
- Reichenbach
- Reichenbächle, tributary of the Breg
- Reichenbächle, tributary of the Schiltach
- Reißenbach
- Rems
- Rench
- Reutenbach
- Reutibach
- Rhine
- Riedbach
- Rimbach
- Rinderbach
- Ringgenbach
- Riss
- Röhlinger Sechta
- Rohrach
- Rohrbach
- Rohrhaldenbach
- Rombach
- Rot, tributary of the Danube
- Rot, tributary of the Kocher
- Rot, tributary of the Wurzacher Ach
- Rotach
- Rotbach, tributary of the Riss
- Rotbach, headstream of the Dreisam
- Rötelbach, tributary of the Danube
- Rötelbach, tributary of the Jagst
- Rötenbach, tributary of the Fichtenberger Rot
- Rötenbach, tributary of the Kocher
- Rotenbach, tributary of the Jagst
- Rötenbach, tributary of the Kinzig
- Rotenbach, tributary of the Rems
- Red Kocher
- Rotklingenbach
- Rottum

== S ==
- Saalbach
- Salinenbach
- Sall
- Salzach
- Sanzenbach
- Saubach, tributary of the Dürnach
- Saubach, alternative name of the Stadtseebach
- Sauerbach, headstream of the Aal
- Sauerbach, headstream of the Avenbach
- Schaich
- Schandtauber
- Schefflenz
- Scherzach
- Schießbach, tributary of the Bühler
- Schießbach, tributary of the Nagold
- Schiltach
- Schleifseebach
- Schlichem
- Schlücht
- Schmerach
- Schmerbach
- Schmiddis
- Schmiebach
- Schmiech
- Schmiecha
- Schmiehe
- Schneidheimer Sechta
- Schönbach
- Schönertsbach
- Schöpfebach
- Schozach
- Schussen
- Schutter
- Schwarza
- Schwarzach, tributary of the Danube
- Schwarzach, tributary of the Schussen
- Schwarzbach, tributary of the Klingengraben
- Schwarzbach, tributary of the Elsenz
- Schwarzenbach, tributary of the Obere Argen
- Schwarzenlachenbach
- Schwippe
- Seckach, tributary of the Jagst
- Seckach, tributary of the Lauchert
- Seerhein
- Seltenbach
- Sendener Bach
- Siechenbach
- Sindelbach, tributary of the Jagst
- Sindelbach, headstream of the Körsch
- Speltach
- Spitzbach
- Springe
- Stadtseebach
- Starzel, tributary of the Neckar
- Starzel, tributary of the Prim
- Stehbach
- Steina
- Steinach, tributary of the Neckar in Neckarsteinach
- Steinach, tributary of the Neckar in Nürtingen
- Steinbach, tributary of the Bühler
- Steinbach, tributary of the Jagst
- Steinhauser Rottum
- Steinlach
- Stille Musel
- Stiller Bach
- Stockacher Aach
- Stockerbach
- Strudelbach
- Sulm
- Sulzbach, tributary of the Rhine
- Sülzbach, tributary of the Sulm
- Sulzbächle

== T ==
- Talbach, right tributary of the Ablach in Göggingen
- Talbach, left tributary of the Ablach in Menningen
- Tälesbach
- Tannschorrenbach
- Teinach
- Tiefenbach, tributary of the Jagst
- Tiefenbach, tributary of the Rems
- Tierbach, headstream of the Ette
- Tierbach, tributary of the Murr
- Tobelbach
- Trauzenbach
- Tumbach
- Tauber

== U ==
- Ulfenbach
- Umlach
- Umpfer
- Untere Argen
- Untere Bära
- Upper Rhine
- Urach
- Ursentalbach
- Urspring

== V ==
- Vogtsbach
- Vorbach, a tributary of the Tauber at Rothenburg ob der Tauber
- Vorbach, a tributary of the Tauber at Weikersheim

== W ==
- Wachbach
- Wagensteigbach
- Waldangelbach
- Warme Riss
- Weggentalbach
- Wehra
- Weiherbach, tributary of the Talbach at Memmingen
- Weiherbach, tributary of the Schmiech
- Weihung
- Weißach, tributary of the Murr
- Weißach, headstream of the Saalbach
- Welzbach
- Weschnitz
- Westernach
- White Kocher
- White Lauter
- Wiesaz
- Wiese
- Wild Gutach
- Wildbach
- Windischenbach
- Windwiesenbach
- Winterlauter
- Wolf
- Wolfegger Ach
- Wollbach
- Wulfbach
- Würm
- Wurzacher Ach
- Wüstenbach
- Wutach
- Wieslauf

== Z ==
- Zaber
- Ziegelbach
- Zimmerbach
- Zipfelbach, tributary of the Lindach
- Zipfelbach, tributary of the Neckar
- Zwiefalter Aach
