= Wildbach =

Wildbach may refer to:

- Wildbach (TV series), a German television series
- Wildbach (Wurm), a river of North Rhine-Westphalia, Germany, tributary of the Wurm
- Wildbach (Main), a river of Baden-Württemberg, Germany, tributary of the Main
