= Warme Riss =

River in Germany

Location
- Country: Germany
- State: Baden-Württemberg

Physical characteristics
- Mouth
  - location: Riss
  - coordinates: 47.9921°N 9.7341°E
- Length: 3.7 km (2.3 mi)

Basin features
- Progression: Riss→ Danube→ Black Sea

Warme Riss (German: Warme Riß) or Mühlbach is a small river of Baden-Württemberg, Germany. It is a headstream of the Riss in Winterstettendorf.

== See also ==
- List of rivers of Baden-Württemberg
