= Rohrhaldenbach =

River in Germany

Location
- Country: Germany
- States: Baden-Württemberg

Physical characteristics
- Mouth
  - location: Neckar
  - coordinates: 48.4861°N 8.9792°E

Basin features
- Progression: Neckar→ Rhine→ North Sea

Rohrhaldenbach is a small river of Baden-Württemberg, Germany. It flows into the Neckar near Rottenburg am Neckar.

== See also ==
- List of rivers of Baden-Württemberg
