= Wulfbach =

River in Germany

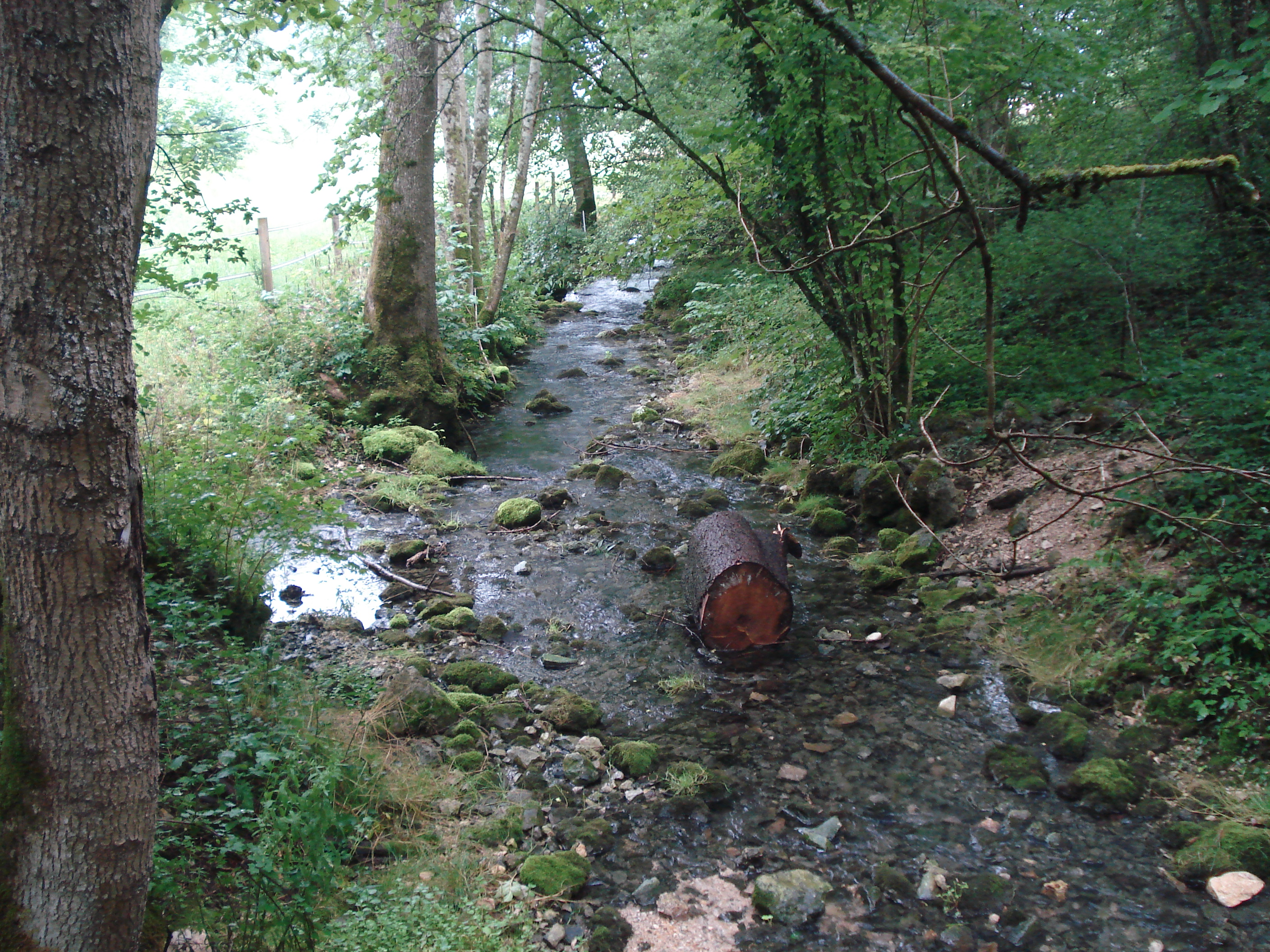

Location
- Country: Germany
- State: Baden-Württemberg

Physical characteristics
- Mouth
  - location: Danube
  - coordinates: 48.0315°N 8.9006°E

Basin features
- Progression: Danube→ Black Sea

Wulfbach is a short river of Baden-Württemberg, Germany. It flows into the Danube near Mühlheim an der Donau.

== See also ==
- List of rivers of Baden-Württemberg
