= Knaupenbach =

River in Germany

Location
- Country: Germany
- States: Baden-Württemberg

Physical characteristics
- Mouth
  - location: Feuerbach
  - coordinates: 48.7874°N 9.1369°E

Basin features
- Progression: Feuerbach→ Neckar→ Rhine→ North Sea

Knaupenbach is a small river of Baden-Württemberg, Germany. It flows into the Feuerbach near Botnang, a Stadtteil of Stuttgart.

== See also ==
- List of rivers of Baden-Württemberg
