= Stockerbach =

River in Germany

Location
- Country: Germany
- State: Baden-Württemberg

Physical characteristics
- Mouth
  - location: Glatt
  - coordinates: 48.4687°N 8.4772°E

Basin features
- Progression: Glatt→ Neckar→ Rhine→ North Sea

Stockerbach is a river in Baden-Württemberg, Germany that is 7 kilometres (4.3 mi) long. It flows into the Glatt in Aach.

== See also ==
- List of rivers of Baden-Württemberg
