= Felbenbach =

River in Germany

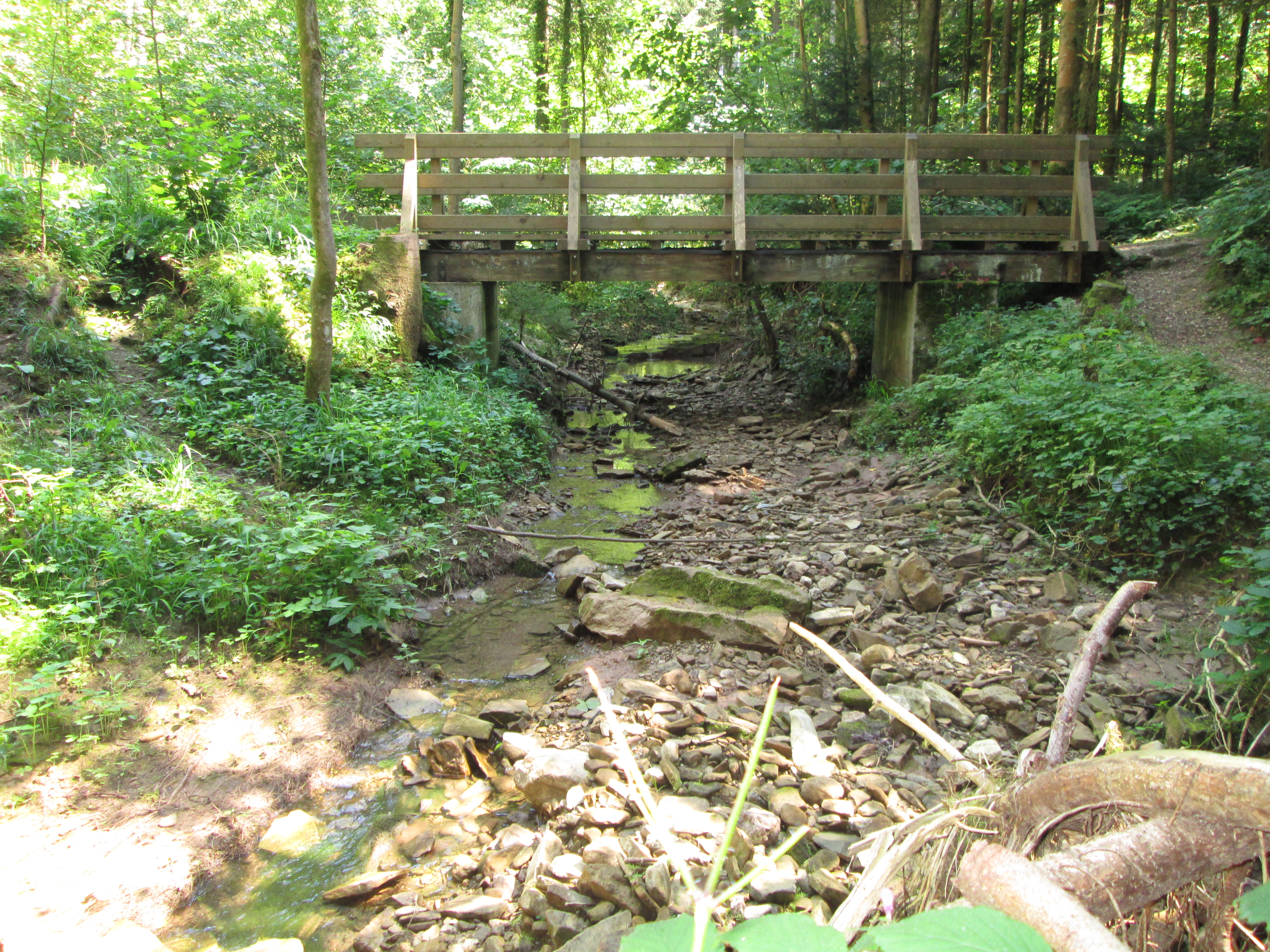

Location
- Country: Germany
- State: Baden-Württemberg

Physical characteristics
- Mouth
  - location: Tiefenbach
  - coordinates: 48.7740°N 9.7678°E

Basin features
- Progression: Tiefenbach→ Rems→ Neckar→ Rhine→ North Sea

The Felbenbach is a small river of Baden-Württemberg, Germany. It flows into the Tiefenbach near Schwäbisch Gmünd.

== See also ==
- List of rivers of Baden-Württemberg
