= Ziegelbach (Brenz) =

River in Germany

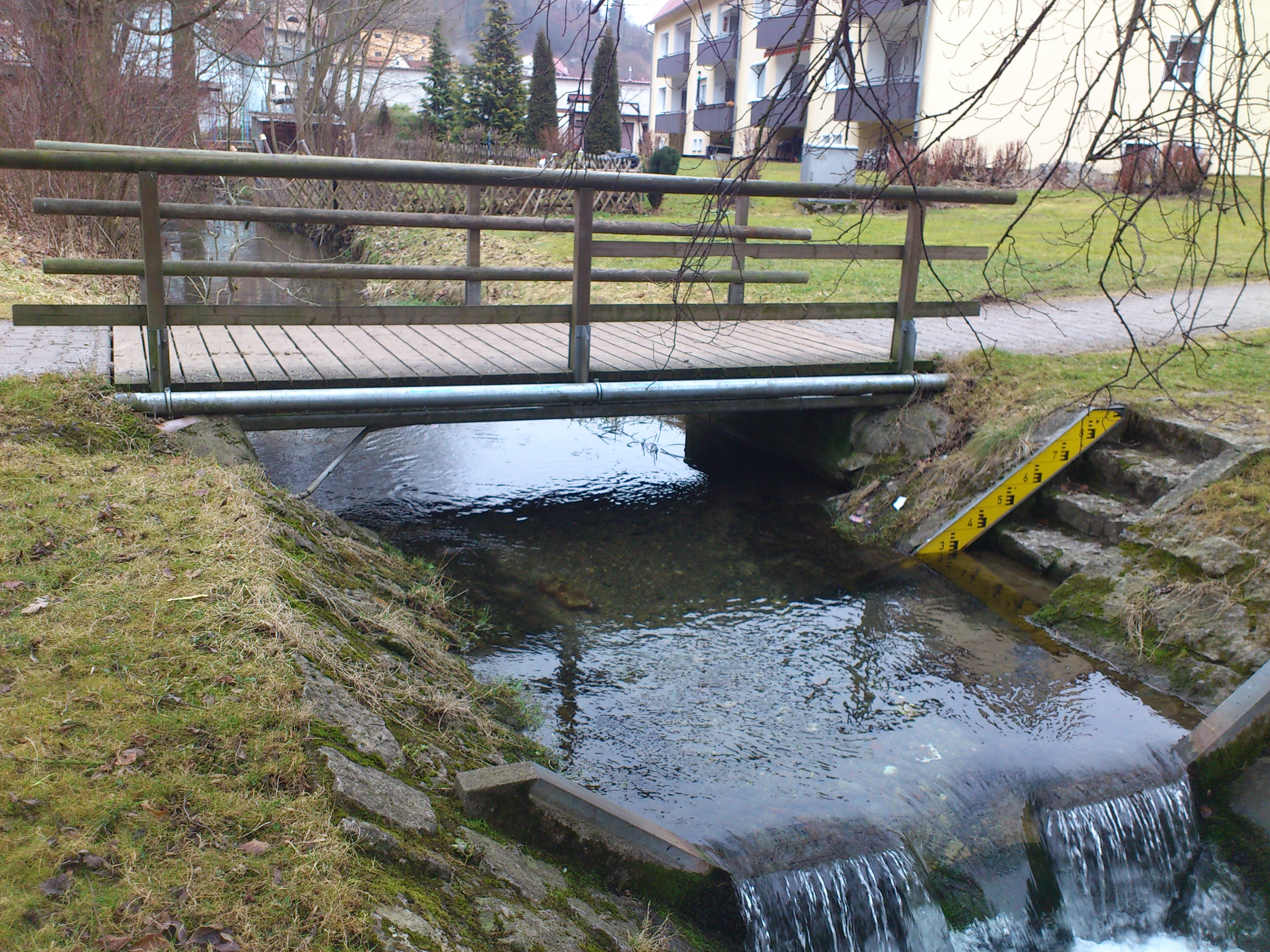

- Mouth of Ziegelbach

Location
- Country: Germany
- State: Baden-Württemberg

Physical characteristics
- Mouth
  - location: Brenz
  - coordinates: 48.7379°N 10.1159°E

Basin features
- Progression: Brenz→ Danube→ Black Sea

Ziegelbach is a small river of Baden-Württemberg, Germany. It is a left tributary of the Brenz in Königsbronn.

== See also ==
- List of rivers of Baden-Württemberg
