= Seltenbach (Neckar) =

River in Germany

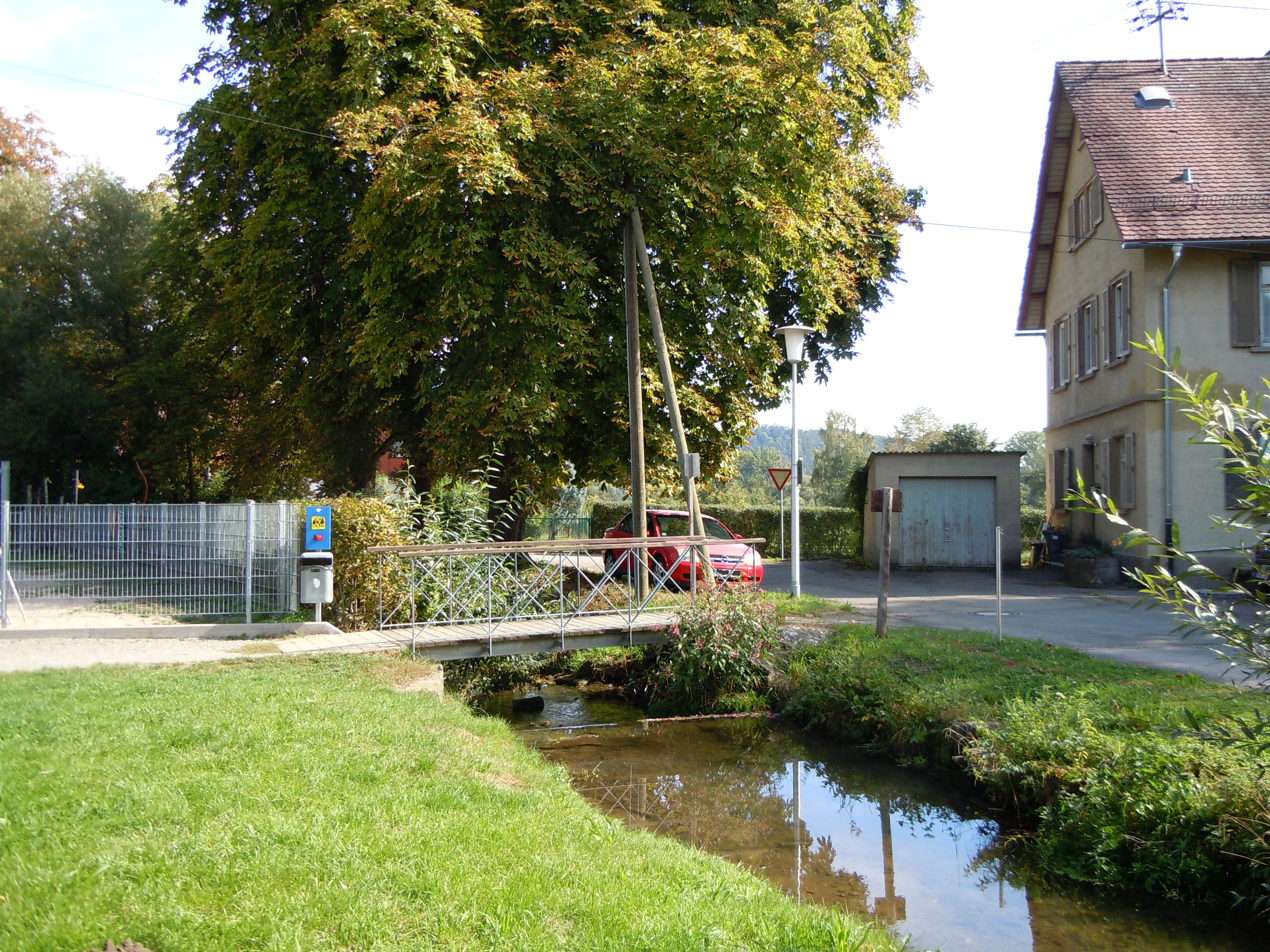

Location
- Country: Germany
- State: Baden-Württemberg

Physical characteristics
- Mouth
  - location: Neckar
  - coordinates: 48.4586°N 8.8753°E
- Length: 16.2 km (10.1 mi)

Basin features
- Progression: Neckar→ Rhine→ North Sea

Seltenbach is a river of Baden-Württemberg, Germany. It flows into the Neckar near Rottenburg am Neckar.

== See also ==
- List of rivers of Baden-Württemberg
