= Tannschorrenbach =

River in Germany

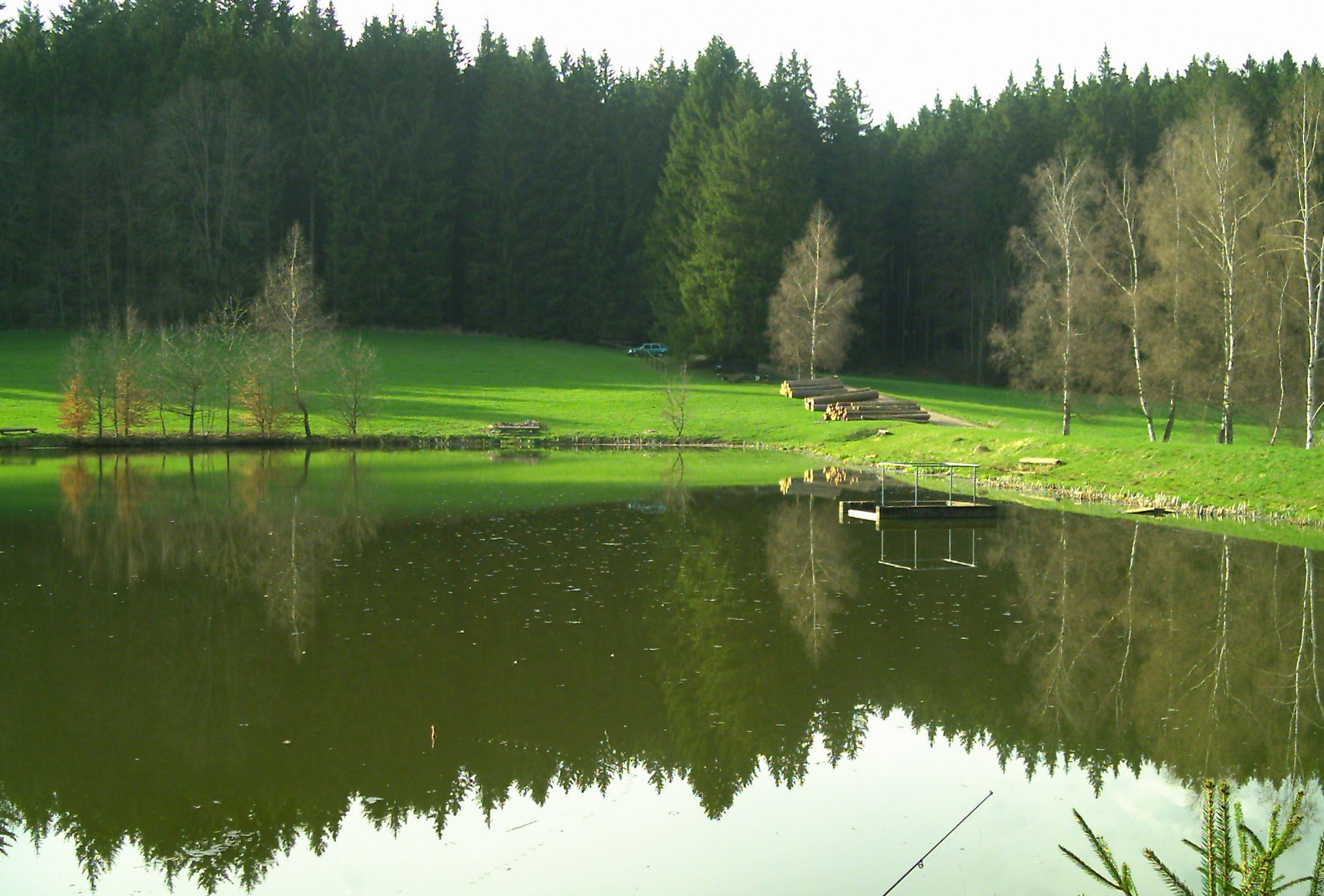

Location
- Country: Germany
- State: Baden-Württemberg

Physical characteristics
- Mouth
  - location: Iller
  - coordinates: 47°59′31″N 10°04′00″E

Basin features
- Progression: Iller→ Danube→ Black Sea

Tannschorrenbach is a small river of Baden-Württemberg, Germany. It flows into the Iller near Tannheim.

== See also ==
- List of rivers of Baden-Württemberg
