= Reichenbächle (Schiltach) =

River in Germany

Location
- Country: Germany
- State: Baden-Württemberg

Physical characteristics
- Mouth
  - location: Schiltach
  - coordinates: 48.2831°N 8.3501°E

Basin features
- Progression: Schiltach→ Kinzig→ Rhine→ North Sea

Reichenbächle is a river of Baden-Württemberg, Germany. It is a tributary of the river Schiltach near the town Schiltach.

== See also ==
- List of rivers of Baden-Württemberg
