= Ellbach (Kocher) =

River in Baden-Württemberg, Germany

Location
- Country: Germany
- State: Baden-Württemberg

Physical characteristics
- Source
  - coordinates: 49.3000°N 9.5333°E
- Mouth
  - location: into the Kocher
  - coordinates: 49.2934°N 9.5318°E

Basin features
- Progression: Kocher→ Neckar→ Rhine→ North Sea

Ellbach is a river of Baden-Württemberg, Germany. It is a right tributary of the Kocher.

== See also ==
- List of rivers of Baden-Württemberg
