= Dollesbach =

River in Germany

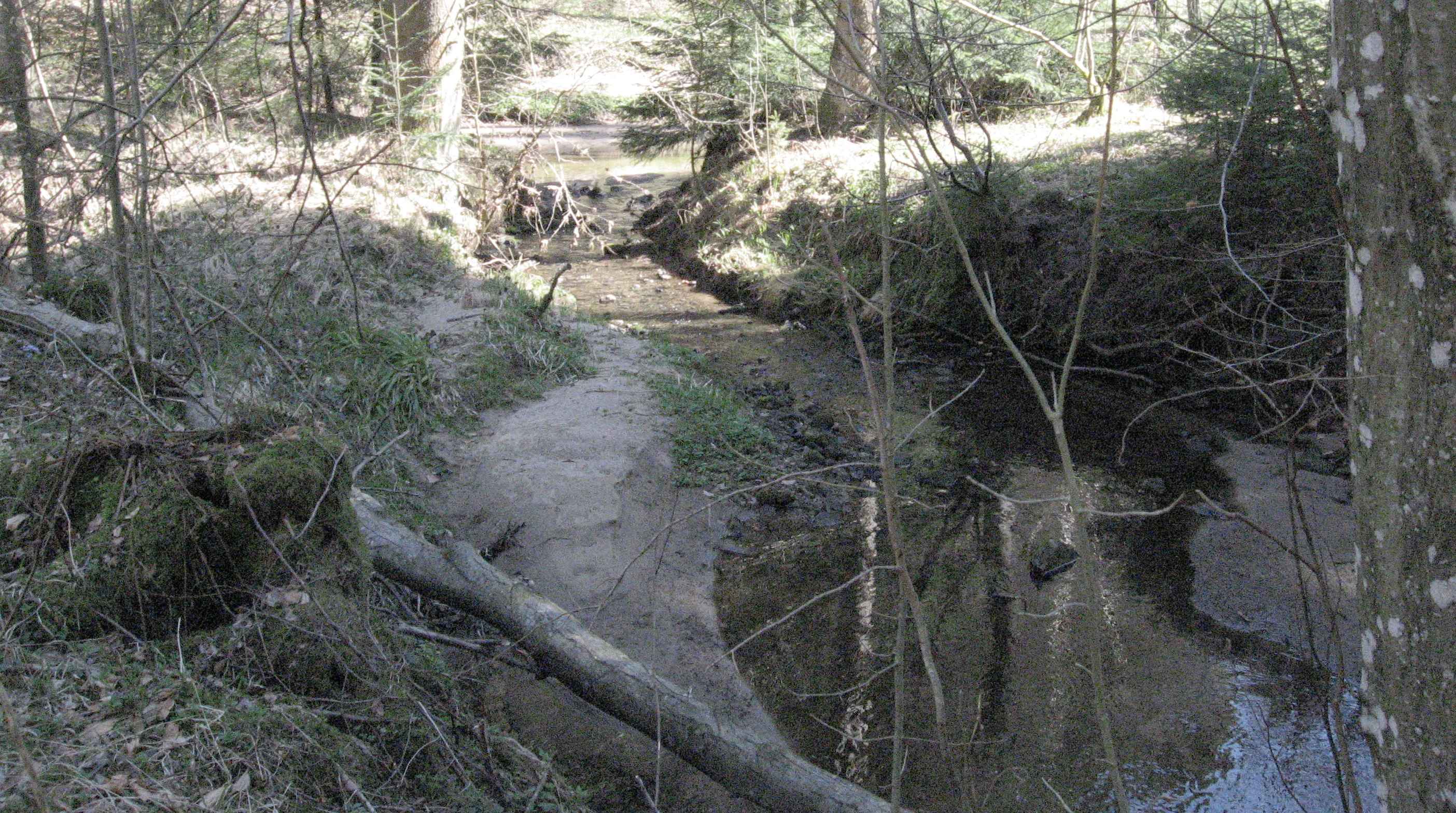
- The Dollesbach near Bühlerzell-Kammerstatt, shortly before its confluence with the Blinde Rot.

Location
- Country: Germany
- State: Baden-Württemberg

Physical characteristics
- Mouth
  - location: Blinde Rot
  - coordinates: 49.0044°N 9.9935°E

Basin features
- Progression: Blinde Rot→ Kocher→ Neckar→ Rhine→ North Sea

The Dollesbach is a small river in Baden-Württemberg, Germany. It flows into the Blinde Rot north of Adelmannsfelden.

== See also ==
- List of rivers of Baden-Württemberg
