= Schöpfebach =

River in Germany

Location
- Country: Germany
- States: Baden-Württemberg

Physical characteristics
- Mouth
  - location: Rhine
  - coordinates: 47°32′41″N 7°56′33″E

Basin features
- Progression: Rhine→ North Sea

Schöpfebach is a small river of Baden-Württemberg, Germany. It flows into the Rhine in Bad Säckingen.

== See also ==
- List of rivers of Baden-Württemberg
