= Kuhnbach =

River in Germany

Location
- Country: Germany
- States: Baden-Württemberg

Physical characteristics
- Mouth
  - location: Rot
  - coordinates: 49.0735°N 9.5123°E

Basin features
- Progression: Rot→ Kocher→ Neckar→ Rhine→ North Sea

The Kuhnbach is a river of Baden-Württemberg, Germany. It flows from the right into the Rot near Mainhardt.

== See also ==
- List of rivers of Baden-Württemberg
