= Weggentalbach =

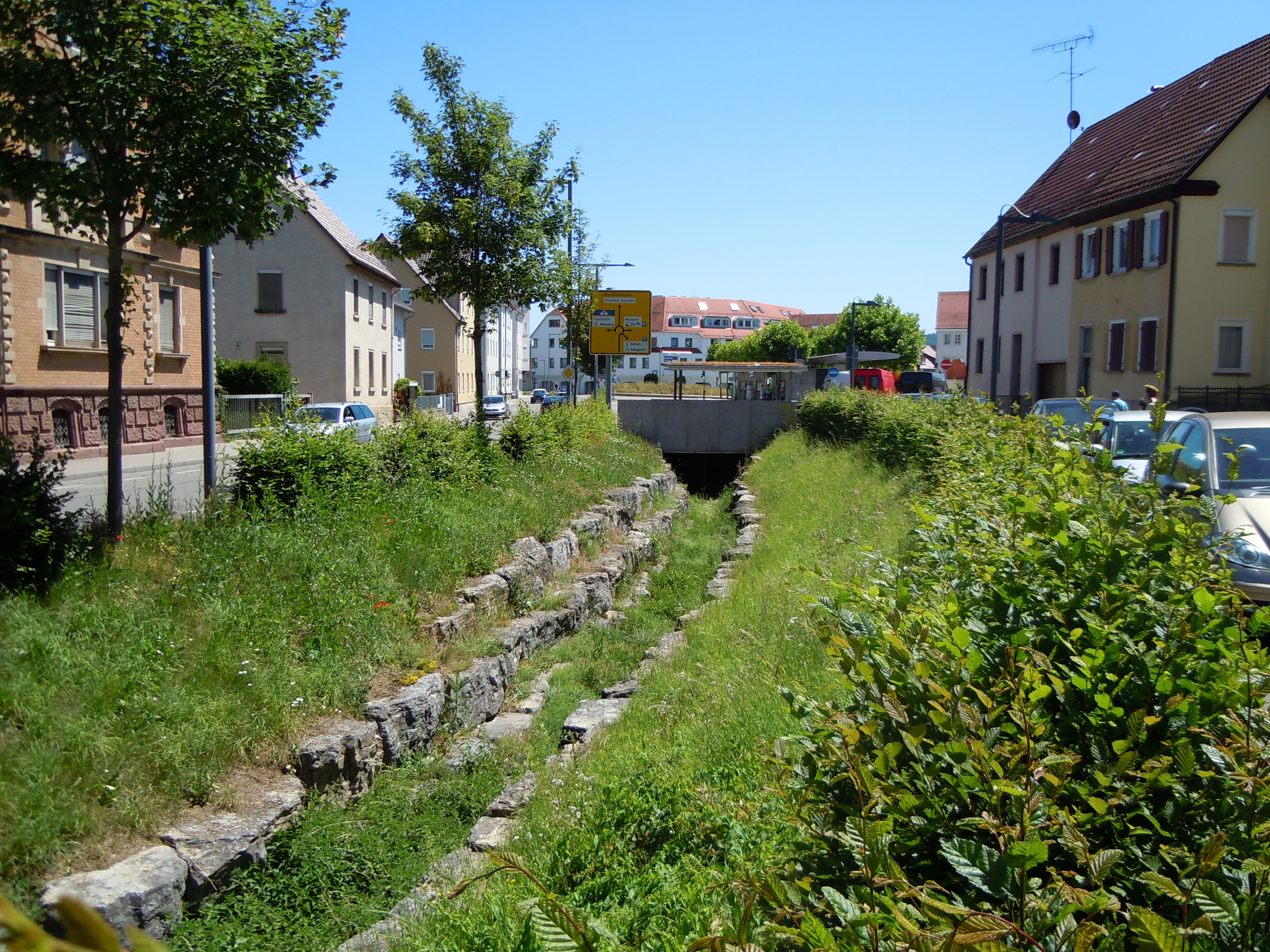

Location
- Country: Germany
- State: Baden-Württemberg

Physical characteristics
- Mouth
  - location: Neckar
  - coordinates: 48.4797°N 8.9339°E
- Length: 10.5 km (6.5 mi)

Basin features
- Progression: Neckar→ Rhine→ North Sea

Weggentalbach is a river of Baden-Württemberg, Germany. It flows into the Neckar in Rottenburg am Neckar.

== See also ==
- List of rivers of Baden-Württemberg
