= Kirnbach (Schiltach) =

River in Germany

Location
- Country: Germany
- States: Baden-Württemberg

Physical characteristics
- Mouth
  - location: Schiltach
  - coordinates: 48°13′4″N 8°23′18″E

Basin features
- Progression: Schiltach→ Kinzig→ Rhine→ North Sea

The Kirnbach is a short river of Baden-Württemberg, Germany. It is a tributary of the Schiltach near Schramberg.

== See also ==
- List of rivers of Baden-Württemberg
