= Pfostenbach =

River in Germany

Location
- Country: Germany
- Location: Baden-Württemberg

Physical characteristics
- Mouth
  - location: Rombach
  - coordinates: 48.8556°N 10.0478°E

Basin features
- Progression: Rombach→ Aal→ Kocher→ Neckar→ Rhine→ North Sea

Pfostenbach is a small river of Baden-Württemberg, Germany. It flows into the Rombach in Hammerstadt.

== See also ==
- List of rivers of Baden-Württemberg
