= Weiherbach (Schmiech) =

River in Baden-Württemberg, Germany

Location
- Country: Germany
- State: Baden-Württemberg

Physical characteristics
- Mouth
  - location: Schmiech
  - coordinates: 48.2802°N 9.7142°E

Basin features
- Progression: Schmiech→ Danube→ Black Sea

Weiherbach is a river of Baden-Württemberg, Germany. It is a right tributary of the Schmiech in Ehingen.

== See also ==
- List of rivers of Baden-Württemberg
