= Kembach (Main) =

River in Germany

Location
- Country: Germany
- States: Bavaria; Baden-Württemberg

Physical characteristics
- Mouth
  - location: Main
  - coordinates: 49.7488°N 9.5697°E
- Length: 14.3 km (8.9 mi)

Basin features
- Progression: Main→ Rhine→ North Sea

Kembach (in its upper course: Welzbach) is a river of Bavaria and Baden-Württemberg, Germany. It flows into the Main near Wertheim am Main.

== See also ==
- List of rivers of Baden-Württemberg
