= Pfühlbach =

River in Germany

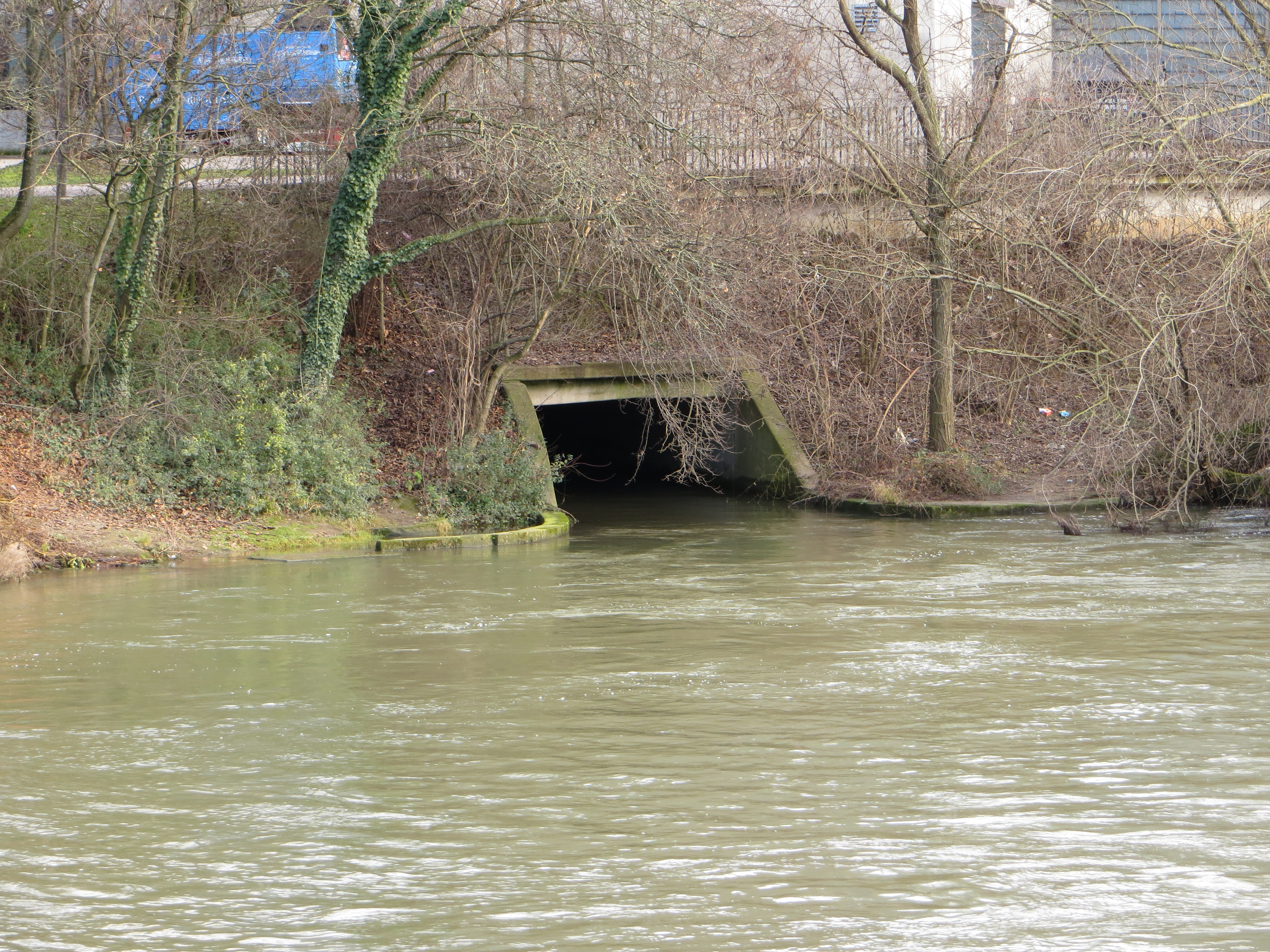

Location
- Country: Germany
- Location: Baden-Württemberg

Physical characteristics
- Mouth
  - location: Neckar
  - coordinates: 49.1460°N 9.2142°E

Basin features
- Progression: Neckar→ Rhine→ North Sea

Pfühlbach is a small river of Baden-Württemberg, Germany. It flows into the Neckar in Heilbronn.

== See also ==
- List of rivers of Baden-Württemberg
