= Langwatte =

River in Germany

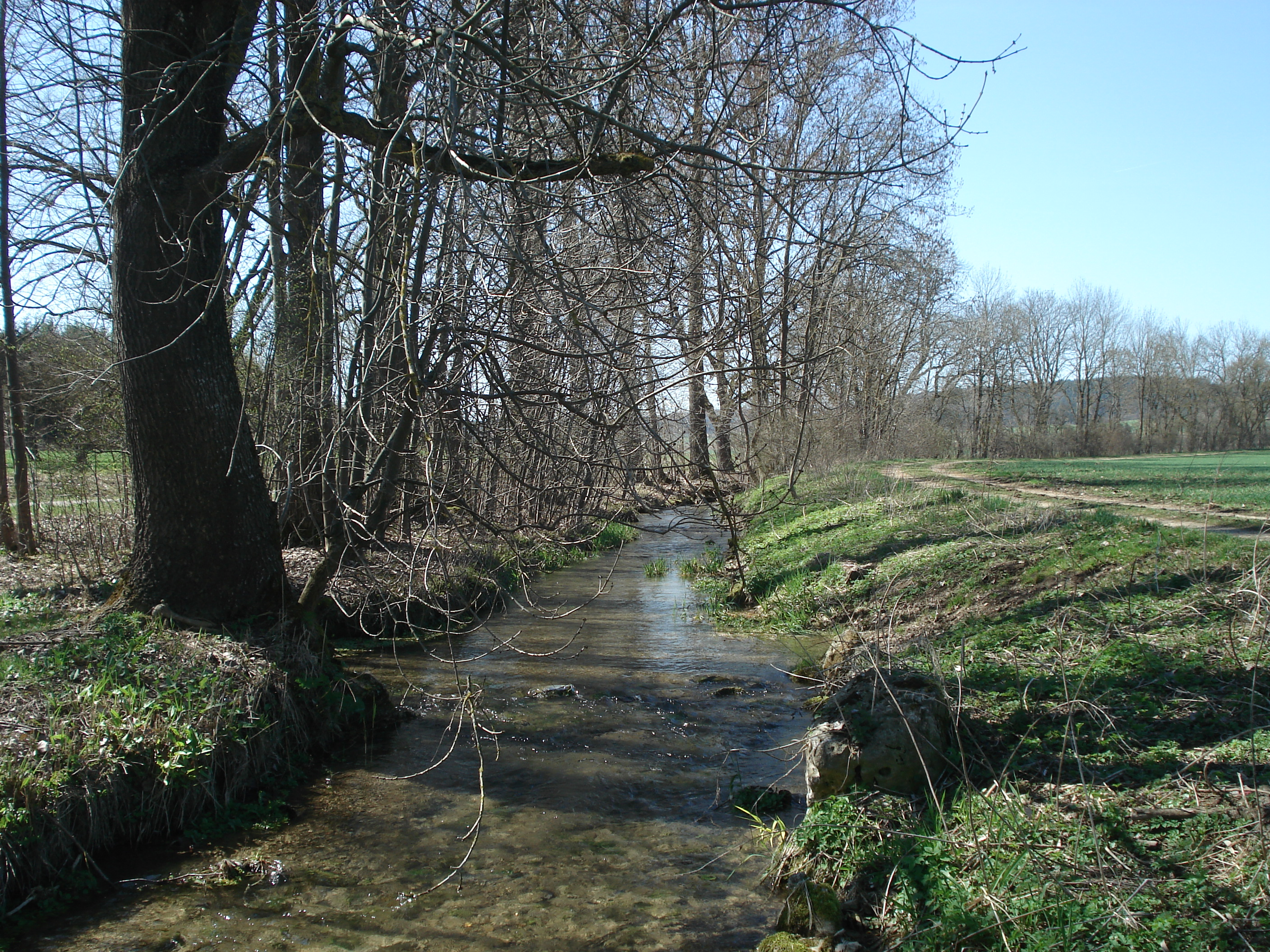

Location
- Country: Germany
- States: Baden-Württemberg

Physical characteristics
- Mouth
  - location: Biberbach
  - coordinates: 48.1507°N 9.3763°E

Basin features
- Progression: Biberbach→ Danube→ Black Sea

Langwatte is a small river of Baden-Württemberg, Germany. It flows into the Biberbach in Langenenslingen.

== See also ==
- List of rivers of Baden-Württemberg
