= Mühlbach (Schussen) =

River in Baden-Württemberg, Germany

Location
- Country: Germany
- States: Baden-Württemberg

Physical characteristics
- Mouth
  - location: Schussen
  - coordinates: 47.7329°N 9.5609°E

Basin features
- Progression: Schussen→ Rhine→ North Sea

Mühlbach is a small river of Baden-Württemberg, Germany. It is a right tributary of the Schussen near Meckenbeuren.

== See also ==
- List of rivers of Baden-Württemberg
