= Rohrbach (Tauber) =

River in Germany

Location
- Country: Germany
- States: Baden-Württemberg and Bavaria

Physical characteristics
- Mouth: Tauber
  - coordinates: 49.2928°N 10.1541°E

Basin features
- Progression: Tauber→ Main→ Rhine→ North Sea

Rohrbach is a river of Baden-Württemberg and of Bavaria, Germany. It is a left tributary of the Tauber.

== See also ==
- List of rivers of Baden-Württemberg
- List of rivers of Bavaria
