= Wieslauf =

River in Germany

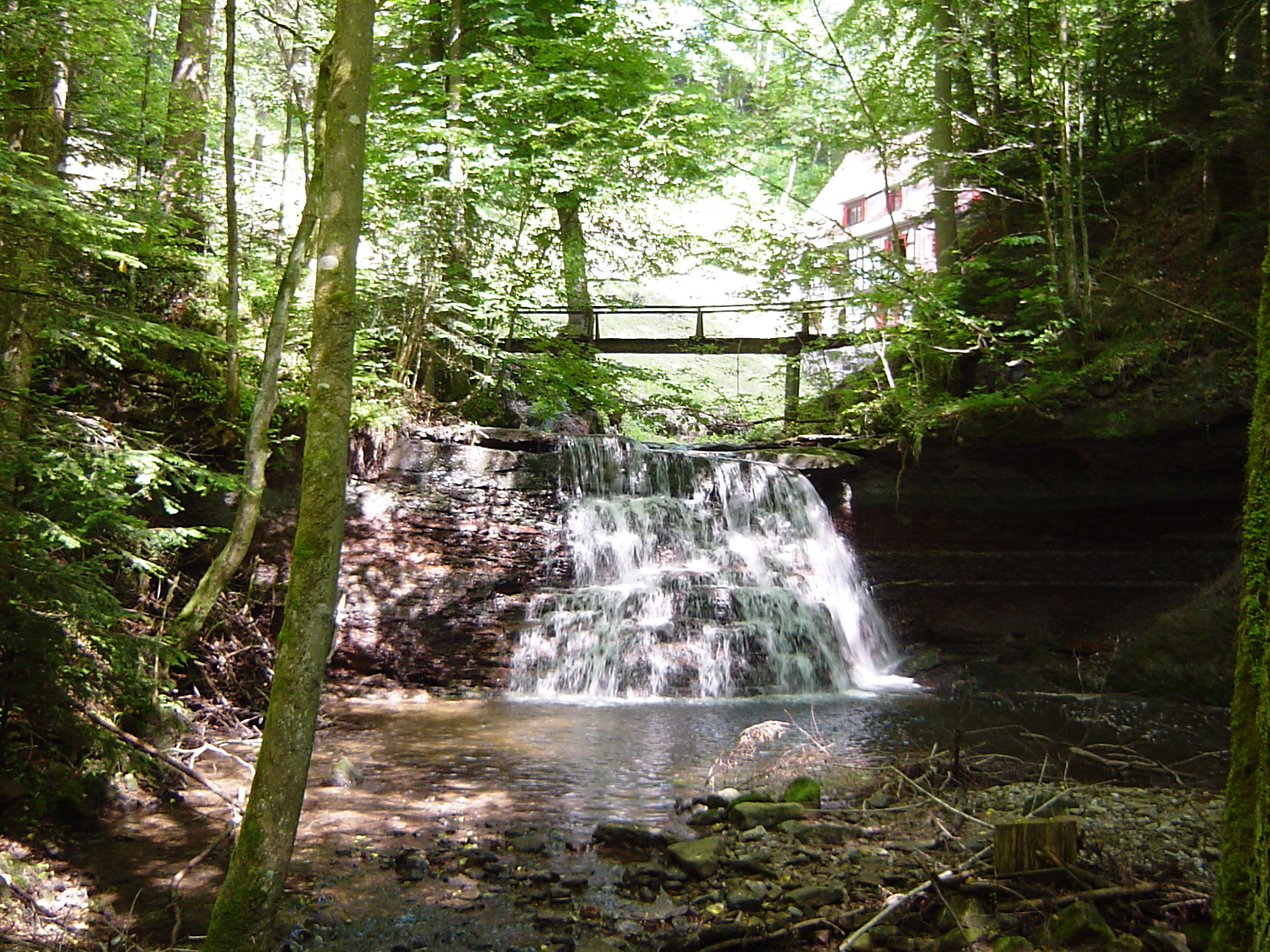

Location
- Country: Germany
- State: Baden-Württemberg

Physical characteristics
- Mouth
  - location: Rems
  - coordinates: 48.8133°N 9.5320°E
- Length: 23.8 km (14.8 mi)

Basin features
- Progression: Rems→ Neckar→ Rhine→ North Sea

Wieslauf is a river of Baden-Württemberg, Germany. It flows into the Rems in Schorndorf.

== See also ==
- List of rivers of Baden-Württemberg
