= Schwarzach (Schussen) =

River in Germany

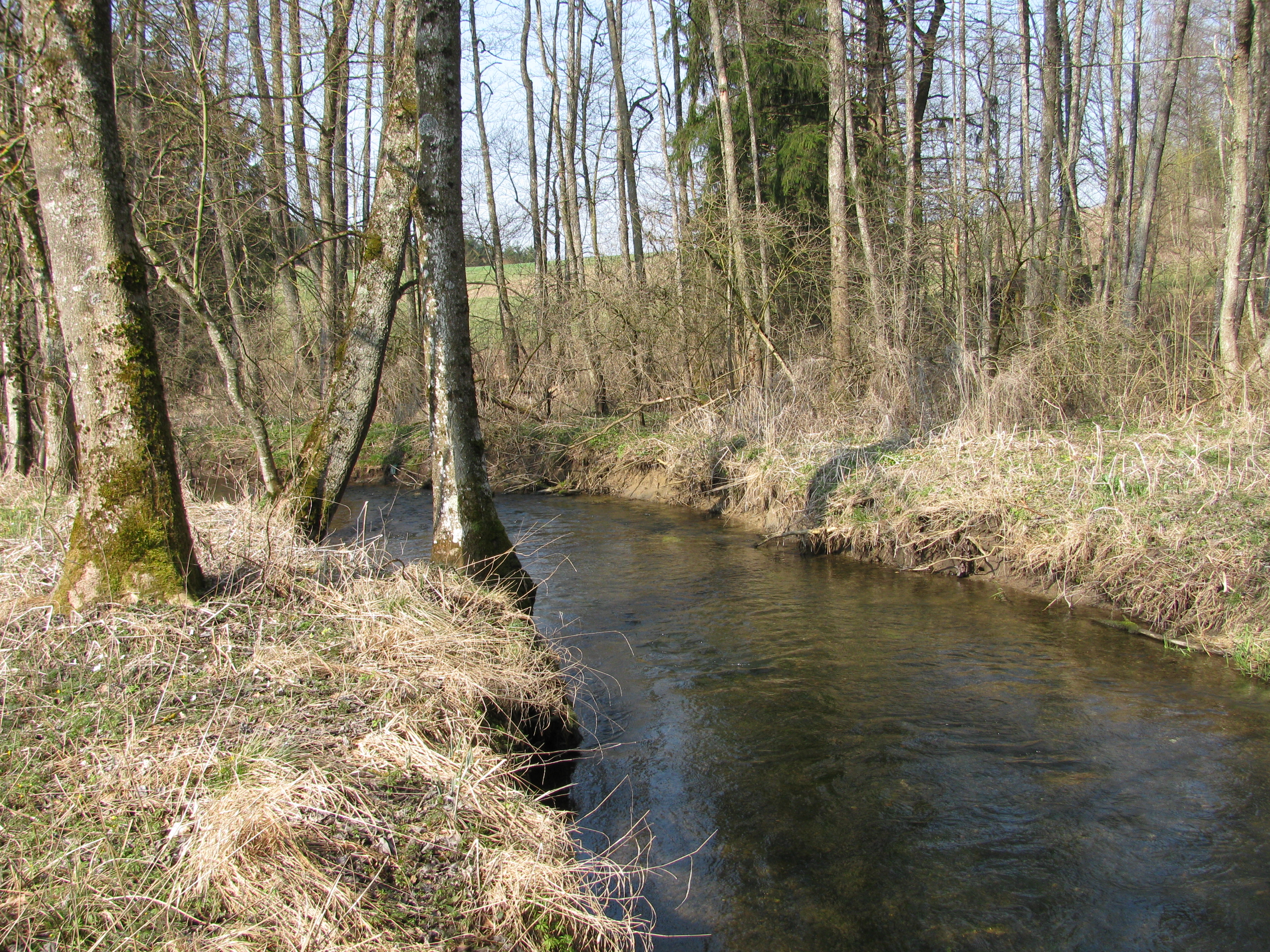

Location
- Country: Germany
- State: Baden-Württemberg

Physical characteristics
- Mouth
  - location: Schussen
  - coordinates: 47°44′16″N 9°33′42″E
- Length: 25.2 km (15.7 mi)

Basin features
- Progression: Schussen→ Rhine→ North Sea

Schwarzach (German pronunciation: [ˈʃvaʁtsax]) is a river of Baden-Württemberg, Germany. It is a left tributary of the Schussen south of Ravensburg.

== See also ==
- List of rivers of Baden-Württemberg
