= Starzel (Prim) =

River in Germany

Location
- Country: Germany
- State: Baden-Württemberg

Physical characteristics
- Mouth
  - location: Prim
  - coordinates: 48°07′46″N 8°40′05″E

Starzel is a river of Baden-Württemberg, Germany. It is a right tributary of the Prim in Neufra, a district of Rottweil.

== See also ==
- List of rivers of Baden-Württemberg
