= Rimbach (Herrgottsbach) =

River in Germany

Location
- Country: Germany
- State: Baden-Württemberg

Rimbach (German pronunciation: [ˈʁɪmbax]) is a river of Baden-Württemberg, Germany. It is the left headstream of the Herrgottsbach.

== See also ==
- List of rivers of Baden-Württemberg
