= Amorsbach =

River in Germany

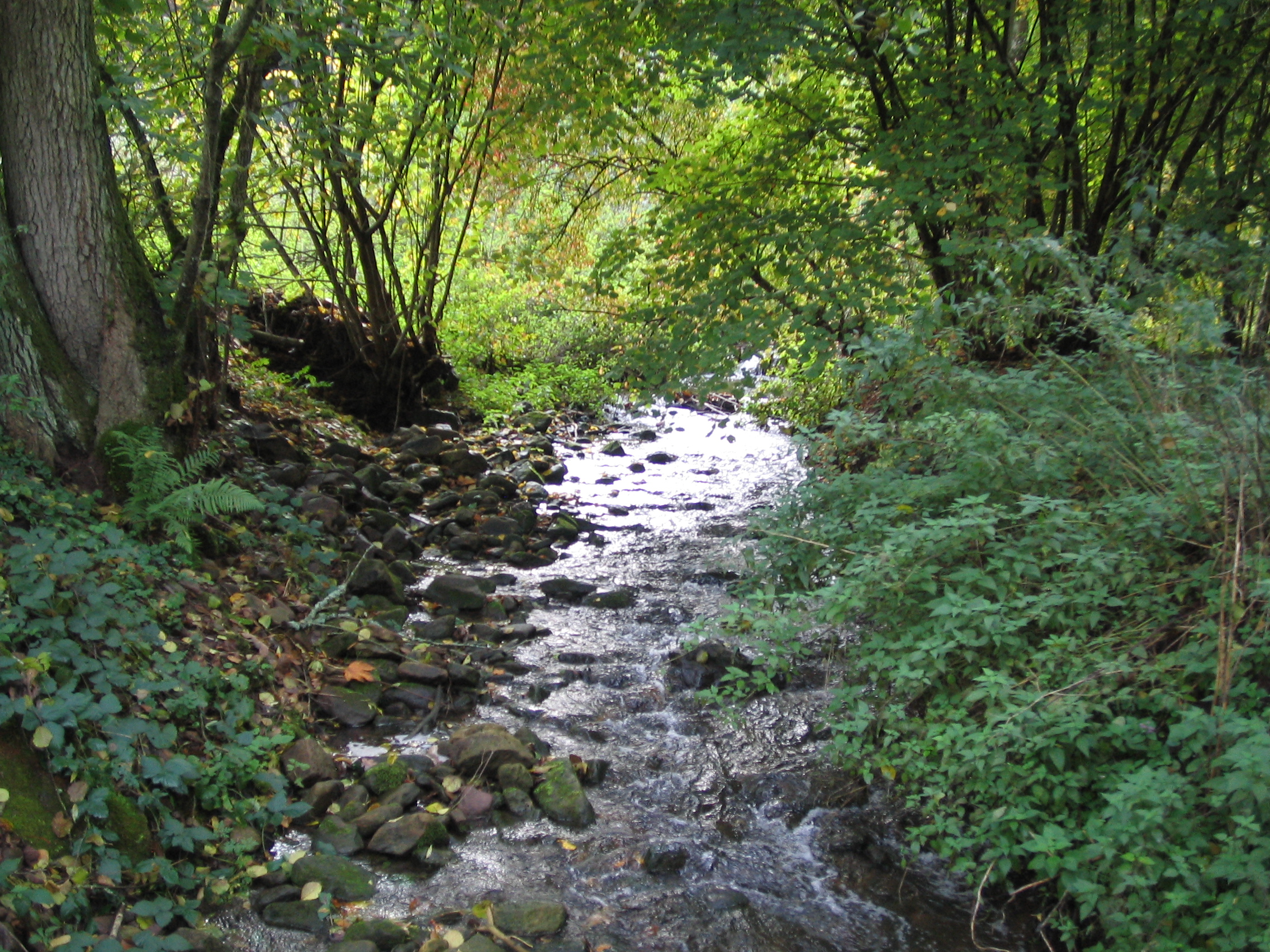
- The Amorsbach shortly before its mouth

- Location of mouth in Baden-Württemberg

Location
- Country: Germany
- State: Baden-Württemberg

Physical characteristics
- Mouth
  - location: Tauber
  - coordinates: 49°41′49″N 9°33′08″E

Basin features
- Progression: Tauber→ Main→ Rhine→ North Sea

The Amorsbach is a river in Baden-Württemberg, Germany. It flows into the Tauber near Bronnbach.

== See also ==
- List of rivers of Baden-Württemberg
