= Buberlesbach =

River in Germany

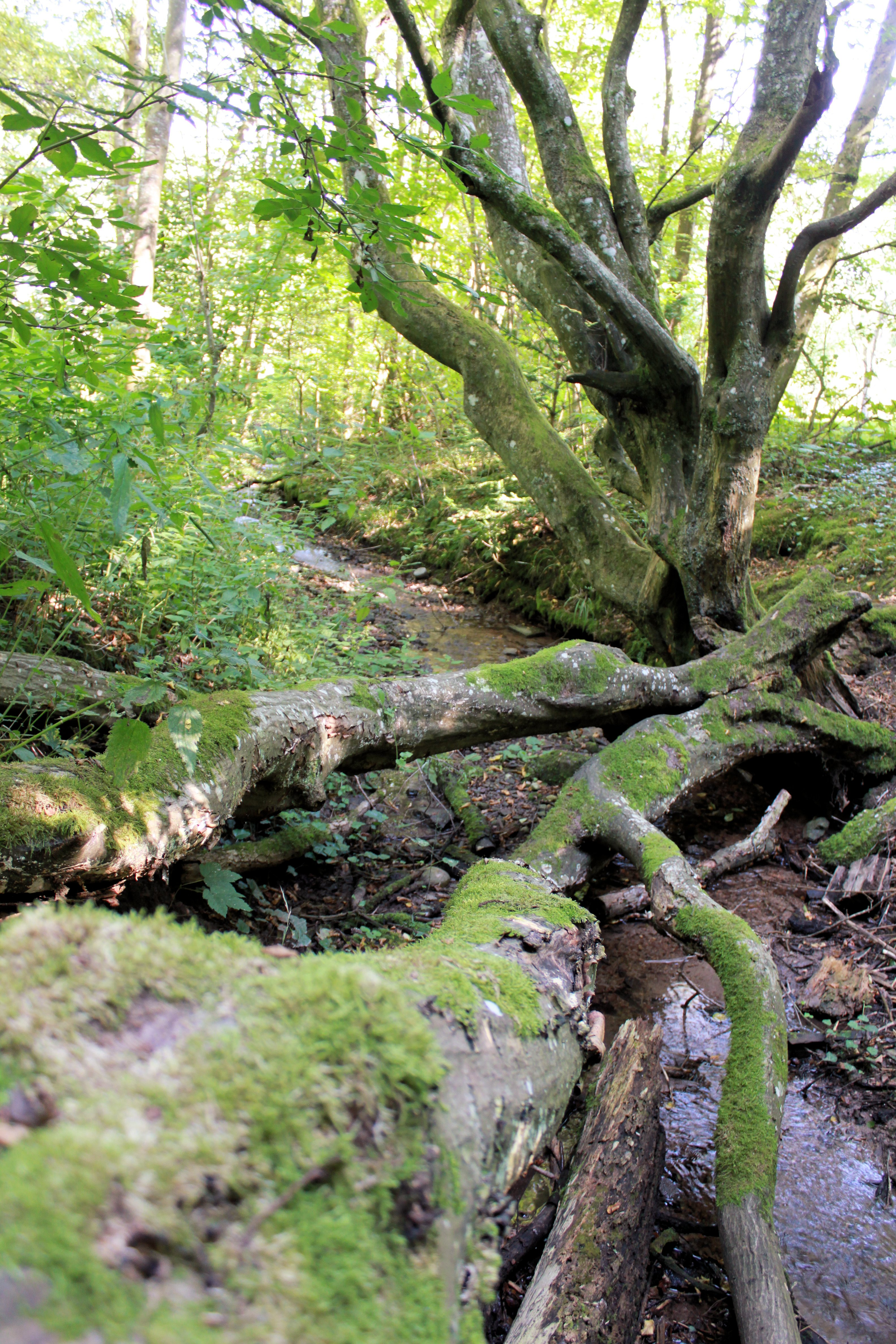
- The Buberlesbach above the Botnanger Wiesen

Location
- Country: Germany
- State: Baden-Württemberg

Physical characteristics
- Mouth
  - location: Sommerhaldenbach
  - coordinates: 48.7789°N 9.1236°E

Basin features
- Progression: Sommerhaldenbach→ Feuerbach→ Neckar→ Rhine→ North Sea

The Buberlesbach is a small river in Baden-Württemberg, Germany. In Botnang, a borough of Stuttgart, it flows into the Sommerhaldenbach, a left tributary of the Metzgerbach.

== See also ==
- List of rivers of Baden-Württemberg
