= Schönertsbach =

River in Germany

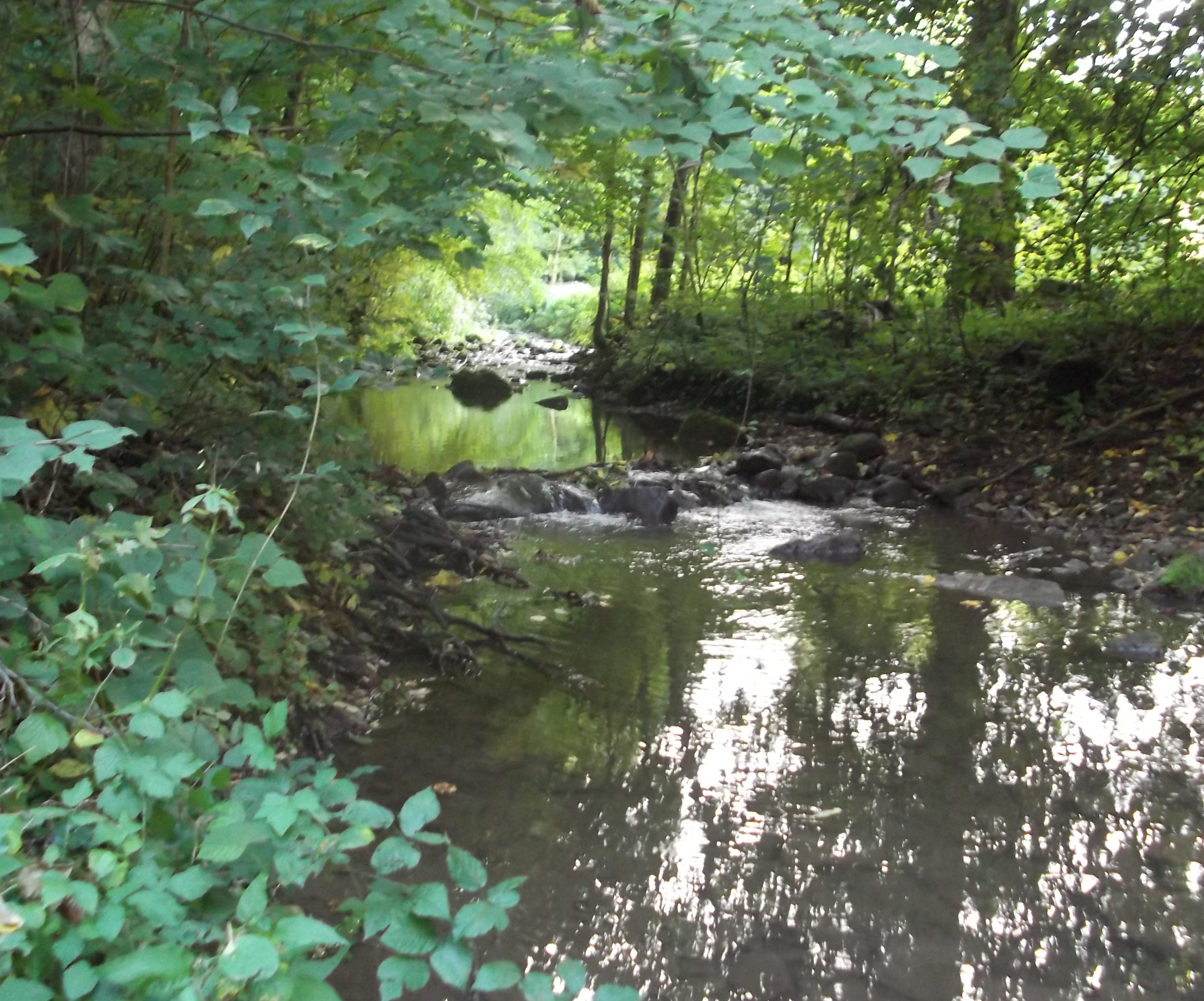

Location
- Country: Germany
- States: Baden-Württemberg

Physical characteristics
- Mouth
  - location: Tauber
  - coordinates: 49°43′01″N 9°31′40″E

Basin features
- Progression: Tauber→ Main→ Rhine→ North Sea

Schönertsbach is a river of Baden-Württemberg, Germany. It flows into the Tauber near Reicholzheim.

== See also ==
- List of rivers of Baden-Württemberg
