= Schwarzach (Danube) =

River in Baden-Württemberg, Germany

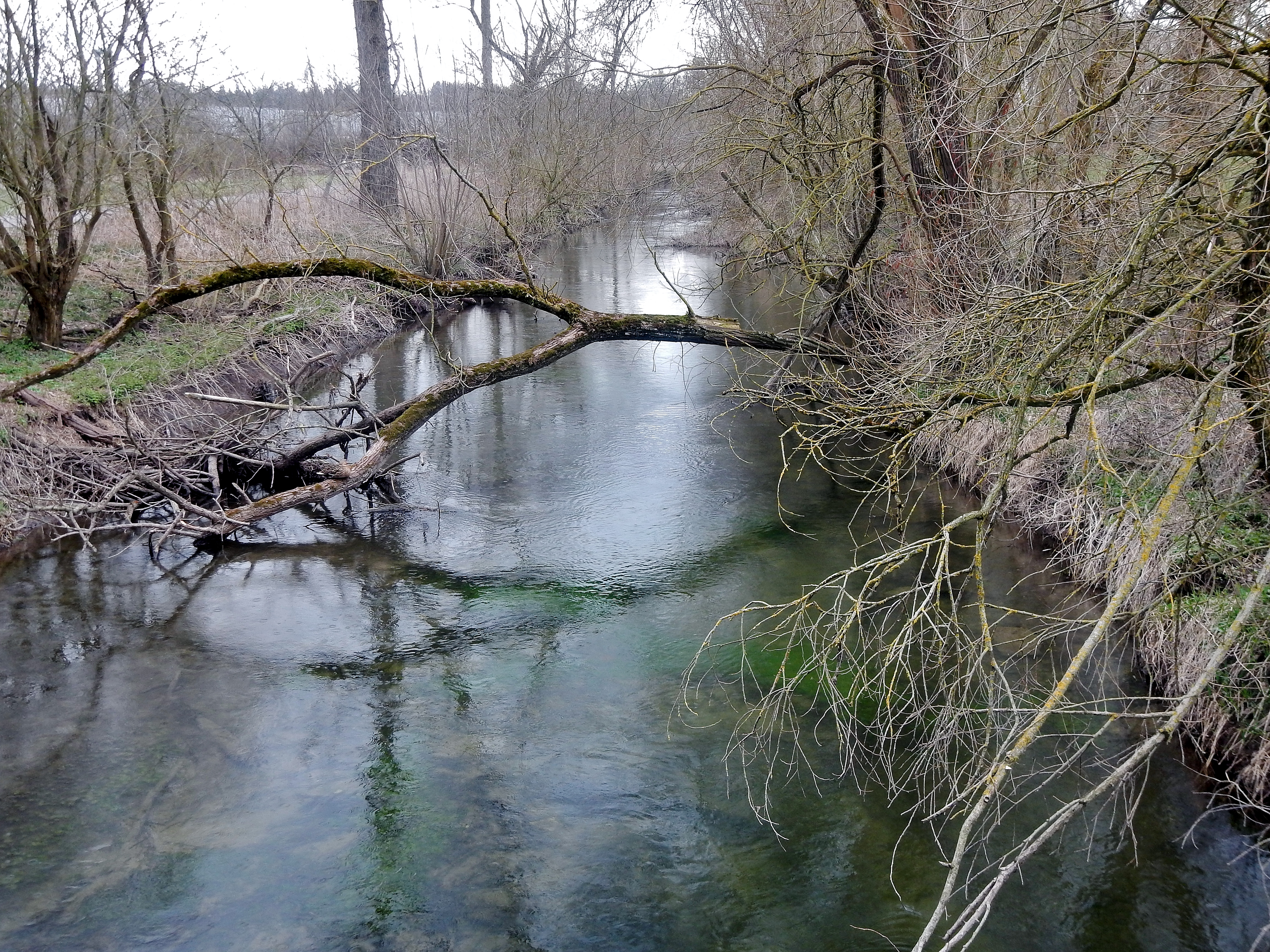
- The Schwarzach at Riedlingen

Location
- Country: Germany
- State: Baden-Württemberg

Physical characteristics
- Mouth
  - location: Danube
  - coordinates: 48°09′41″N 9°29′31″E
- Length: 22.2 km (13.8 mi)

Basin features
- Progression: Danube→ Black Sea

Schwarzach (German pronunciation: [ˈʃvaʁtsax]) is a river of Baden-Württemberg, Germany. It is a right tributary of the Danube at Riedlingen.

== See also ==
- List of rivers of Baden-Württemberg
