= Ellbach (Sulm) =

River in Germany

Location
- Country: Germany
- State: Baden-Württemberg

Physical characteristics
- Mouth
  - location: into the Sulm
  - coordinates: 49.1504°N 9.3228°E

Basin features
- Progression: Sulm→ Neckar→ Rhine→ North Sea

Ellbach is a river of Baden-Württemberg, Germany. It is a left tributary of the Sulm in Ellhofen.

== See also ==
- List of rivers of Baden-Württemberg
