= Schleifseebach =

River in Germany

Location
- Country: Germany
- States: Baden-Württemberg

Physical characteristics
- Mouth
  - location: Bühler
  - coordinates: 49.0099°N 9.9142°E

Basin features
- Progression: Bühler→ Kocher→ Neckar→ Rhine→ North Sea
- Tributaries
  - right: Reutenbach

Schleifseebach (in its upper course: Kochklingenbach) is a small river of Baden-Württemberg, Germany. It is a tributary of the Bühler which it joins near Bühlerzell.

== See also ==
- List of rivers of Baden-Württemberg
