= Kötach =

River in Germany

Location
- Country: Germany
- State: Baden-Württemberg

Physical characteristics
- Mouth
  - location: Danube
  - coordinates: 47.9214°N 8.6375°E
- Length: 17.9 km (11.1 mi)

Basin features
- Progression: Danube→ Black Sea

Kötach is a river of Baden-Württemberg, Germany. It flows into the Danube in Geisingen.

== See also ==
- List of rivers of Baden-Württemberg
