= Flappach =

River in Germany

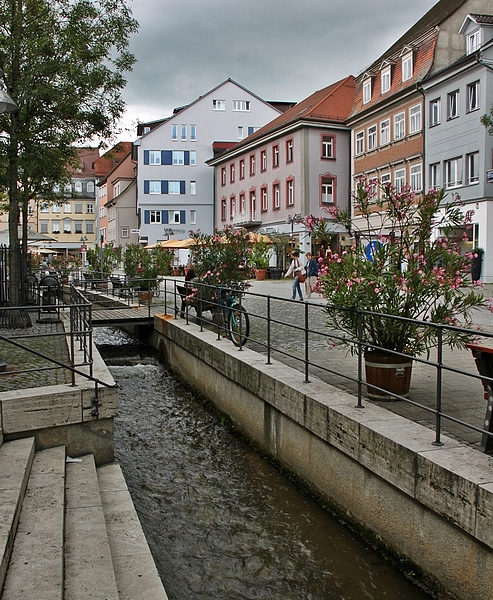

Location
- Country: Germany
- State: Baden-Württemberg

Physical characteristics
- Mouth
  - location: Schussen
  - coordinates: 47°46′55″N 9°36′05″E

Basin features
- Progression: Schussen→ Rhine→ North Sea

Flappach (in its lower course: Stadtbach) is a river of Baden-Württemberg, Germany. It flows into the Schussen in Ravensburg.

== Course and Geography ==
The Flappach is an approximately seven-kilometer-long (4.3 miles) left and southeastern tributary of the Schussen river. The river originates from the Flappachquellen (Flappach Springs) near the location Kemmerlang. Shortly after its source, it flows through the Flappachweiher, a small reservoir, before continuing past the district of Ittenbeuren and through the Flappachtal valley into the Mühlenvorstadt (Mill Suburb) of Ravensburg. Within the inner city of Ravensburg, its lower course is known as the Stadtbach and is partially exposed to view, running through the former tanner and dyer district known as Pfannenstiel before emptying into the Schussen river.

== See also ==
- List of rivers of Baden-Württemberg
