= Fehla =

River in Germany

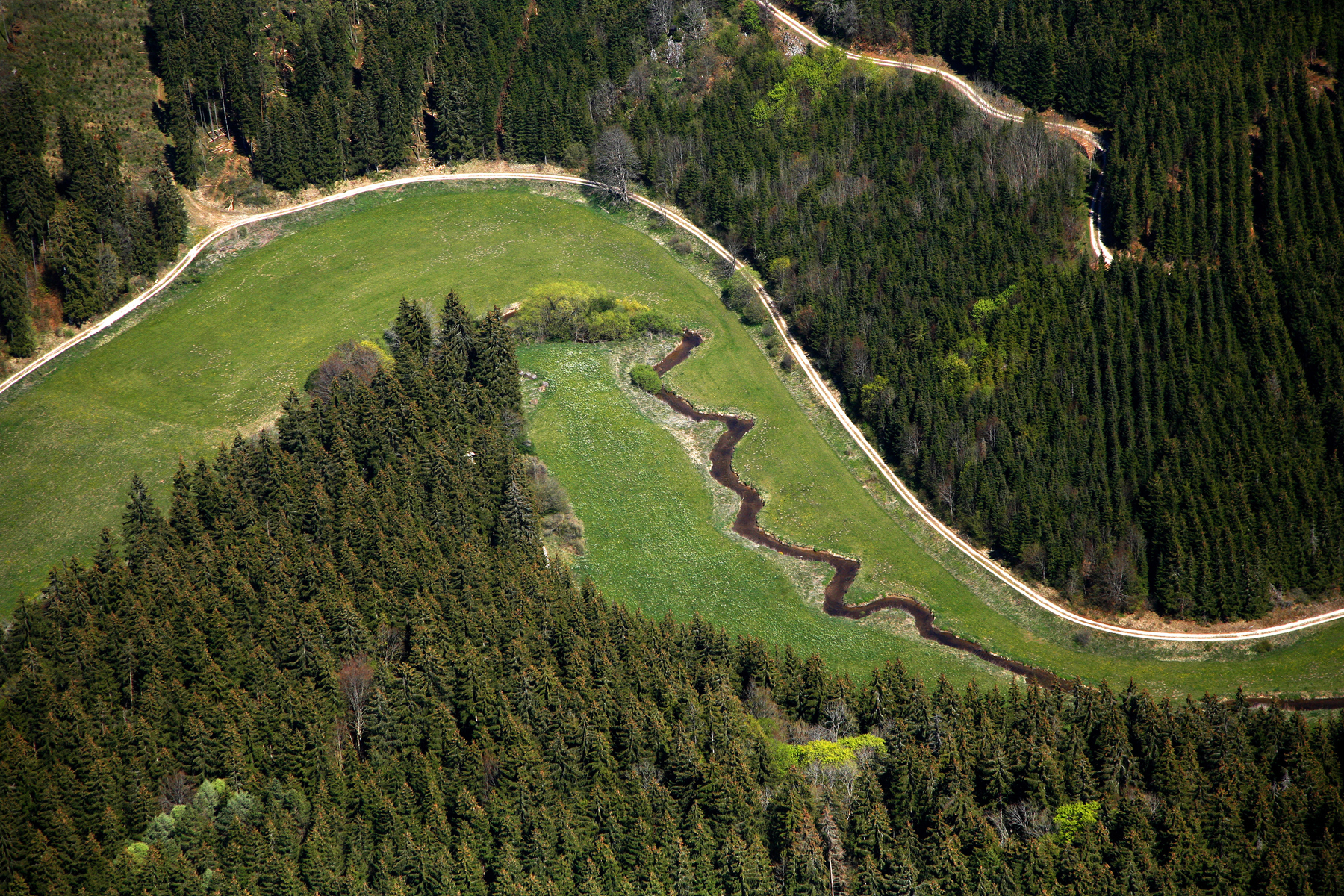

Location
- Country: Germany
- State: Baden-Württemberg

Physical characteristics
- Source
  - location: Burladingen
- Mouth
  - location: Lauchert near Hettingen
  - coordinates: 48.2089°N 9.2222°E
- Length: 18.0 km (11.2 mi)

Basin features
- Progression: Lauchert→ Danube→ Black Sea

Fehla is a river of Baden-Württemberg, Germany. It flows into the Lauchert near Hettingen.

== See also ==
- List of rivers of Baden-Württemberg
