= Muckenseebach =

River in Germany

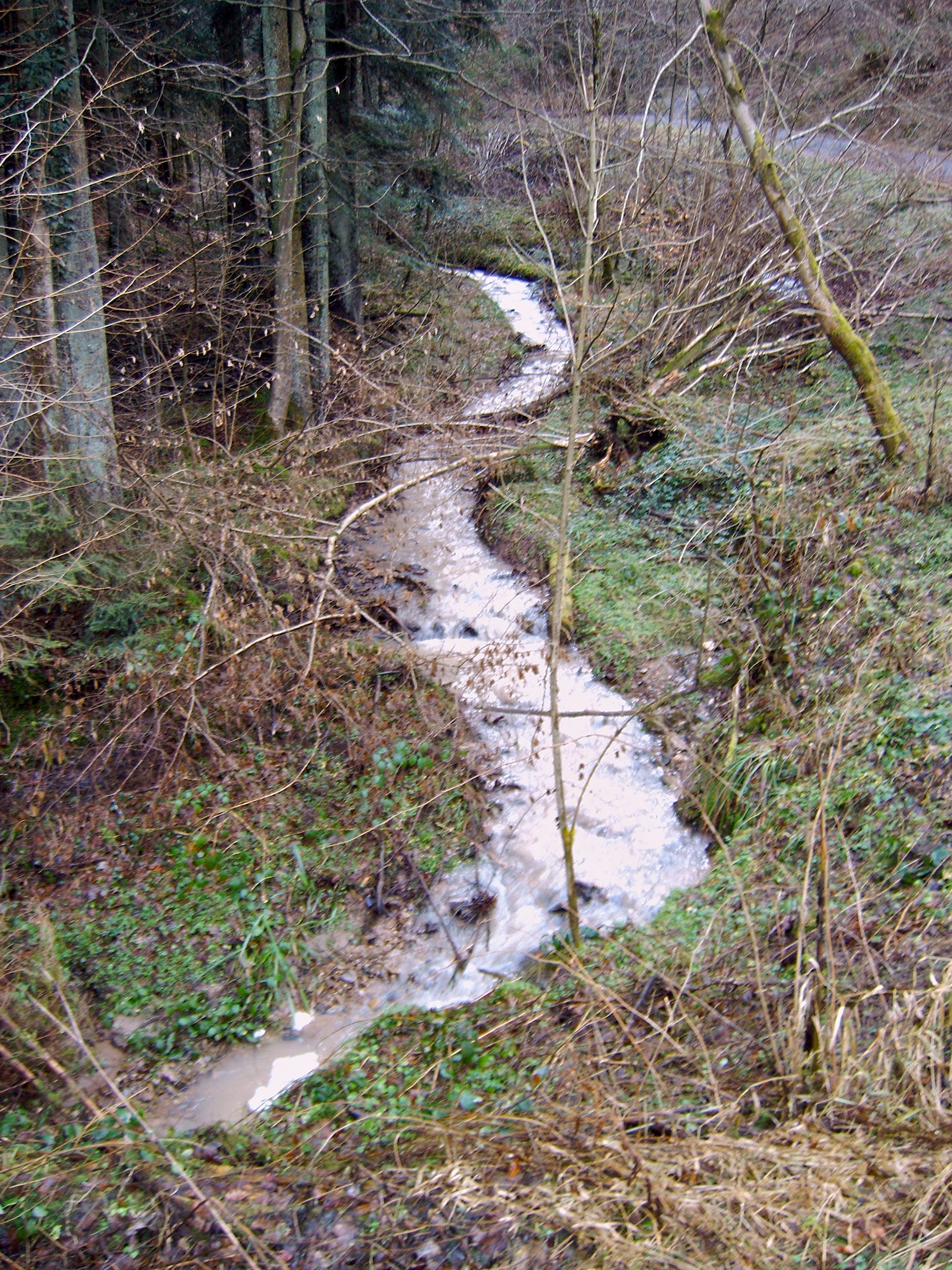

Location
- Country: Germany
- States: Baden-Württemberg

Physical characteristics
- Mouth
  - location: Rems
  - coordinates: 48.7971°N 9.7022°E

Basin features
- Progression: Rems→ Neckar→ Rhine→ North Sea

Muckenseebach is a small river of Baden-Württemberg, Germany. It flows into the Rems near Lorch.

== See also ==
- List of rivers of Baden-Württemberg
