= Springe (Schmiech) =

River in Germany

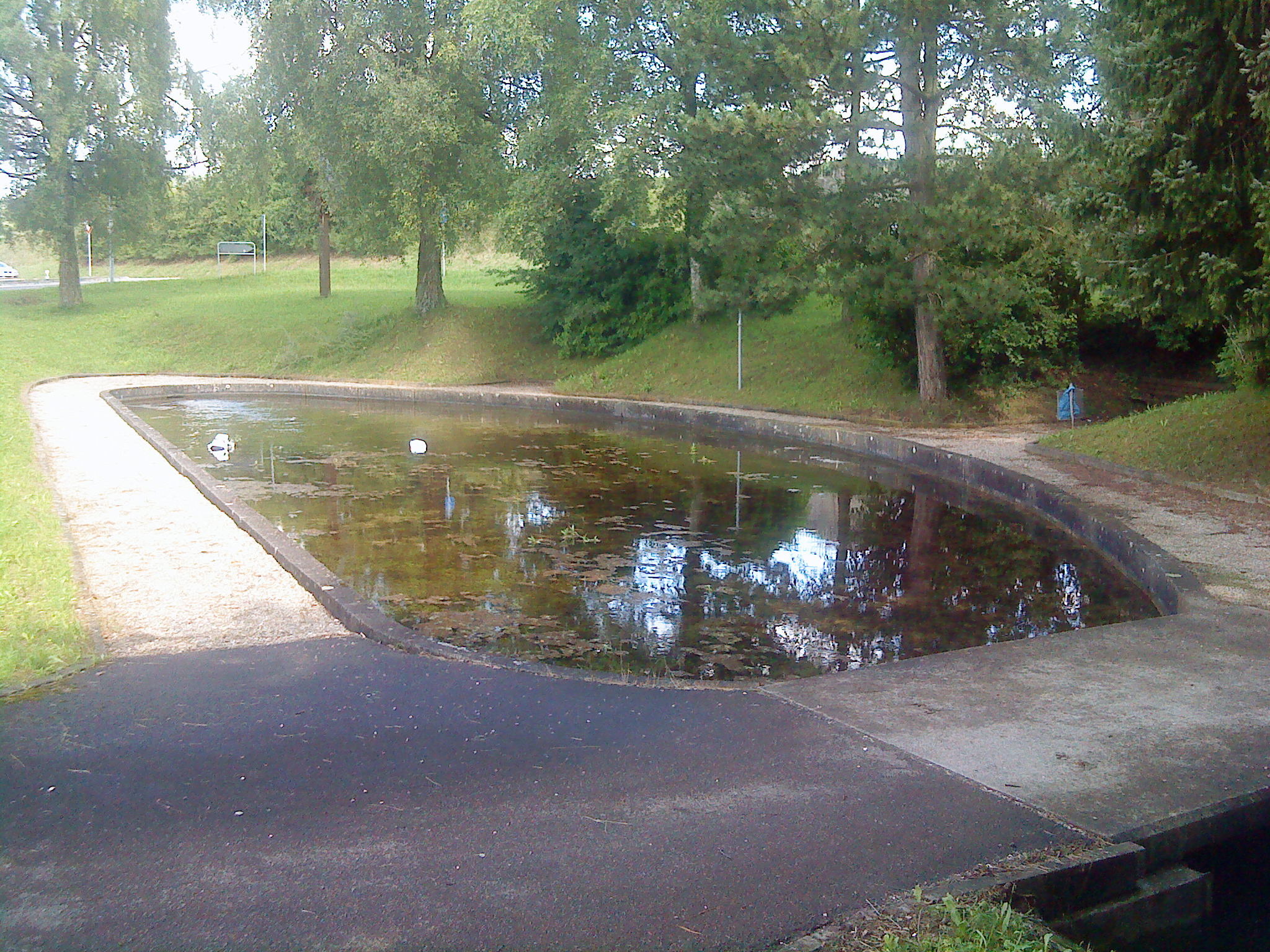

Location
- Country: Germany
- State: Baden-Württemberg

Physical characteristics
- Mouth
  - location: Schmiech
  - coordinates: 48°20′06″N 9°43′31″E

Basin features
- Progression: Schmiech→ Danube→ Black Sea

The Springe is a short river in Baden-Württemberg, Germany. It flows to the Schmiech at Allmendingen.

== See also ==
- List of rivers of Baden-Württemberg
