= Maisenbach =

River in Germany

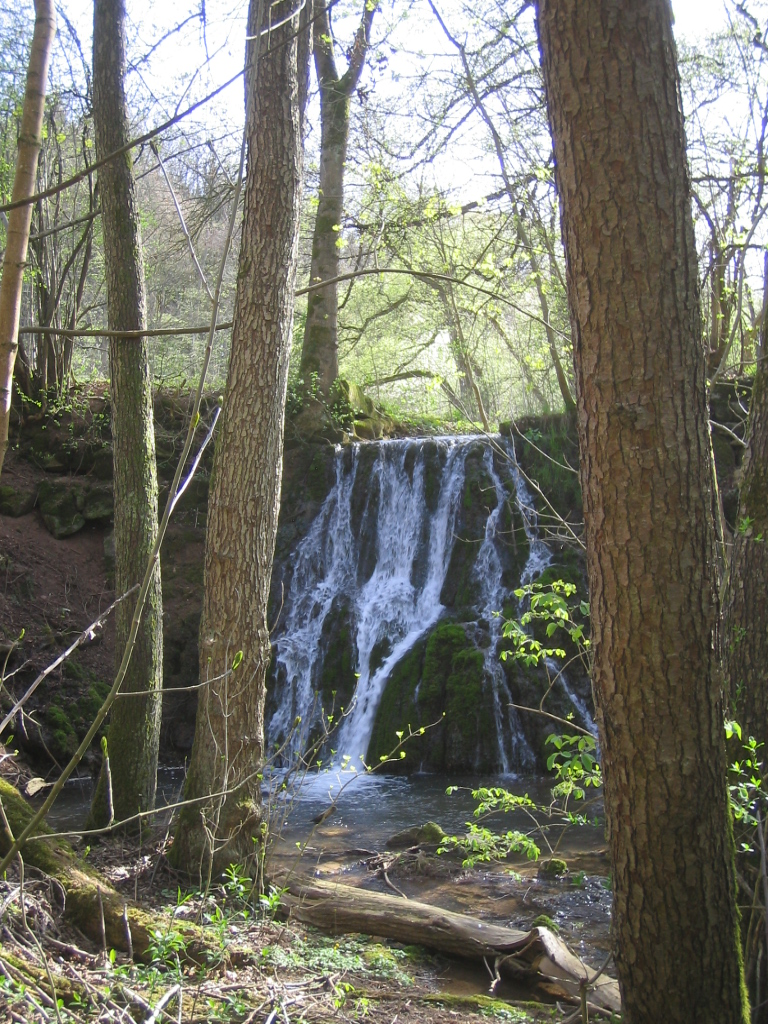

Location
- Country: Germany
- States: Baden-Württemberg

Physical characteristics
- Mouth
  - location: Tauber
  - coordinates: 49.6897°N 9.5975°E

Basin features
- Progression: Tauber→ Main→ Rhine→ North Sea

Maisenbach is a river of Baden-Württemberg, Germany. It flows into the Tauber near Werbach. The river is 62 km long (with upper course Hartgraben), with it starting in the city of Uissigheim. It initially flows briefly northeast and soon turns north through a valley that is now wooded on the slopes. At the Dahlenflur it turns north. Through a narrow valley it flows west past the Kammerforst forest, passes a former pumice stone factory and finally flows into the Tauber near the village mill, south of the Werbach district of Gamburg.

== See also ==
- List of rivers of Baden-Württemberg
