= Heglach =

River in Germany

Coordinates: 49°09′N 8°29′E

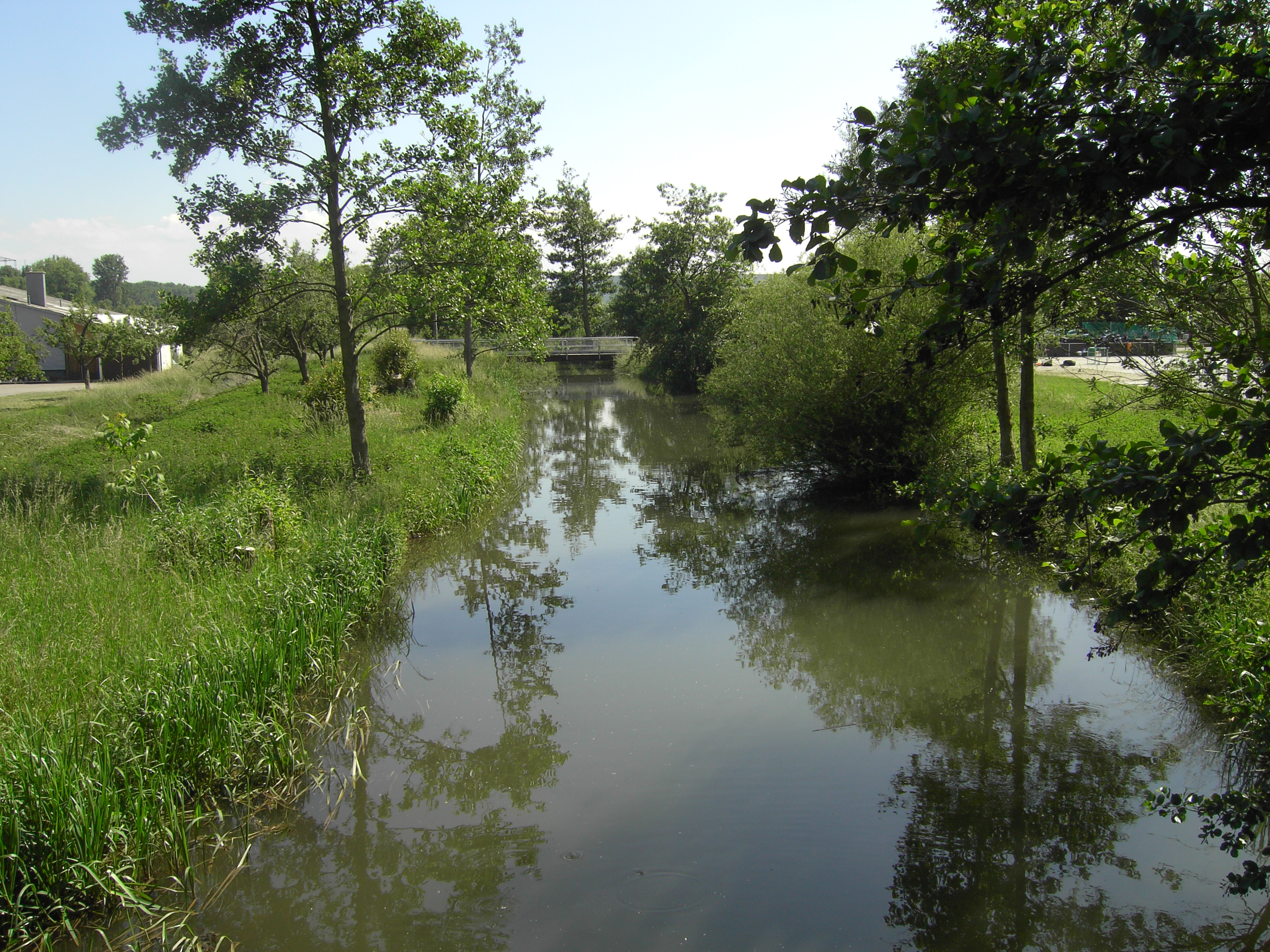

Location
- Country: Germany
- States: Baden-Württemberg

Heglach is a river of Baden-Württemberg, Germany. It is a branch of the river Pfinz near Karlsruhe.

== See also ==
- List of rivers of Baden-Württemberg
