= Siechenbach (Brenz) =

River in Baden-Württemberg, Germany

Location
- Country: Germany
- State: Baden-Württemberg

Physical characteristics
- Mouth: Brenz
  - location: Bächingen an der Brenz, Germany
  - coordinates: 48°33′01″N 10°18′17″E

Basin features
- Progression: Brenz→ Danube→ Black Sea

Siechenbach is a river of Baden-Württemberg, Germany. It is a right tributary of the Brenz in Bächingen an der Brenz.

== See also ==
- List of rivers of Baden-Württemberg
