= Epbach =

River in Germany

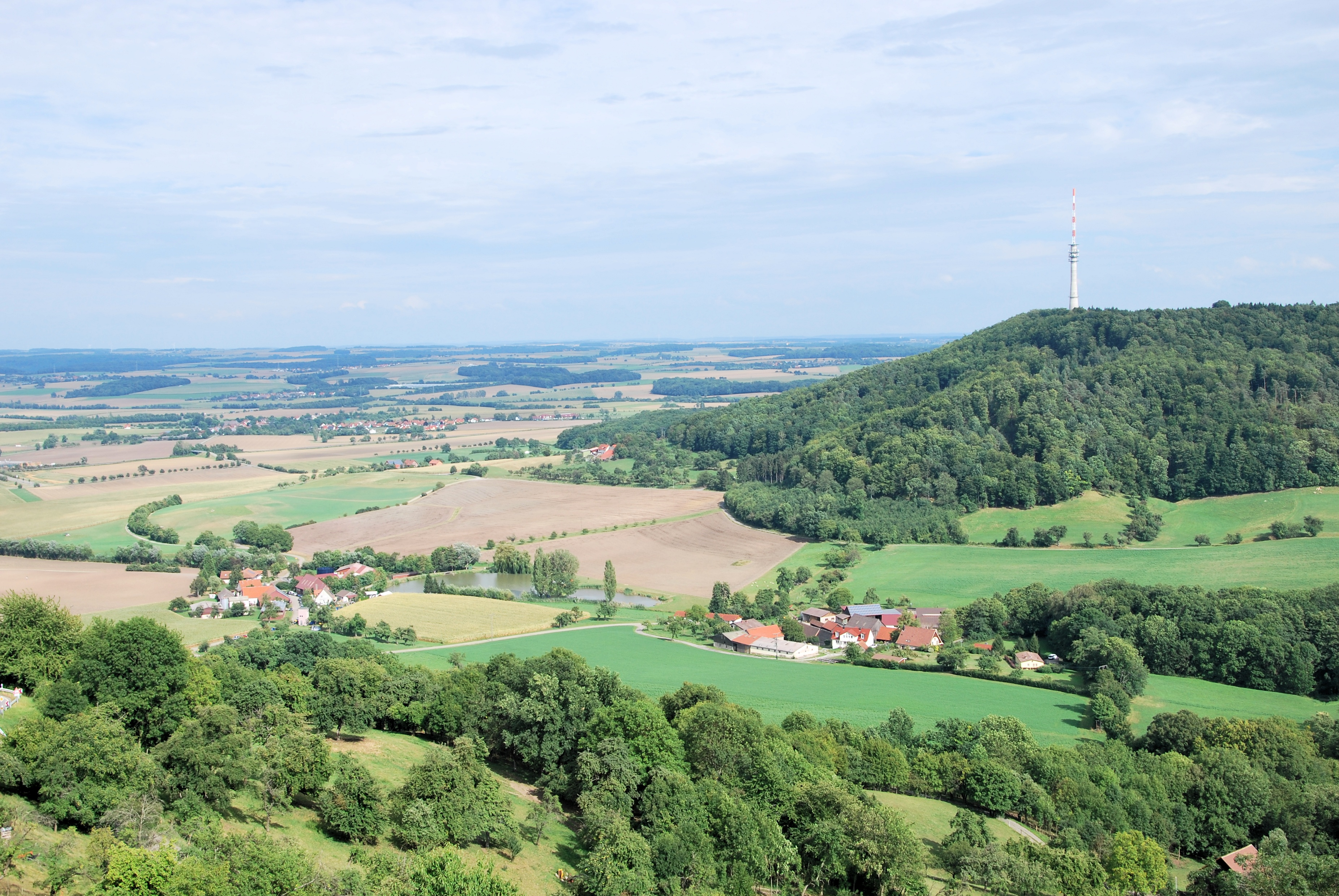

Location
- Country: Germany
- State: Baden-Württemberg

Physical characteristics
- Mouth
  - location: Ohrn
  - coordinates: 49.1983°N 9.5288°E
- Length: 17.3 km (10.7 mi)

Basin features
- Progression: Ohrn→ Kocher→ Neckar→ Rhine→ North Sea

The Epbach is a river of Baden-Württemberg, Germany. It flows into the Ohrn near Öhringen.

== See also ==
- List of rivers of Baden-Württemberg
