= Lautenbach (Linzer Aach) =

River in Germany

Location
- Country: Germany
- State: Baden-Württemberg

Physical characteristics
- Mouth
  - location: Linzer Aach
  - coordinates: 47.8820°N 9.2192°E

Basin features
- Progression: Linzer Aach→ Rhine→ North Sea

Lautenbach (German pronunciation: [ˈlaʊtn̩bax]) is a small river of Baden-Württemberg, Germany. It is a left tributary of the Linzer Aach.

== See also ==
- List of rivers of Baden-Württemberg
