= Umpfer =

River in Germany

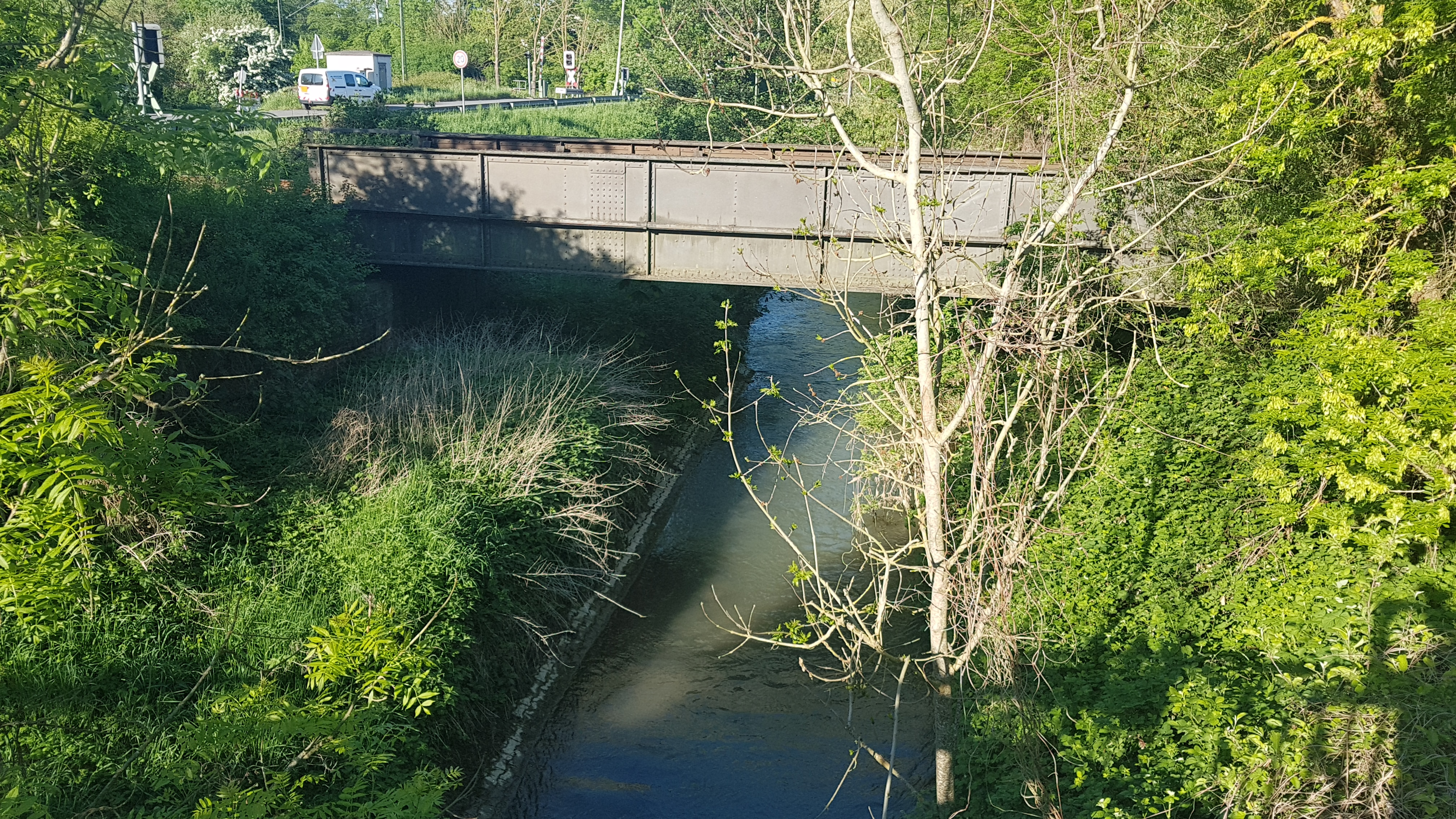

Location
- Country: Germany
- State: Baden-Württemberg

Physical characteristics
- Mouth
  - location: Tauber
  - coordinates: 49.5459°N 9.7283°E
- Length: 21.8 km (13.5 mi)

Basin features
- Progression: Tauber→ Main→ Rhine→ North Sea

Umpfer is a river of Baden-Württemberg, Germany. It flows into the Tauber in Lauda-Königshofen.

== See also ==
- List of rivers of Baden-Württemberg
