= Aitrach (Danube) =

River in Germany

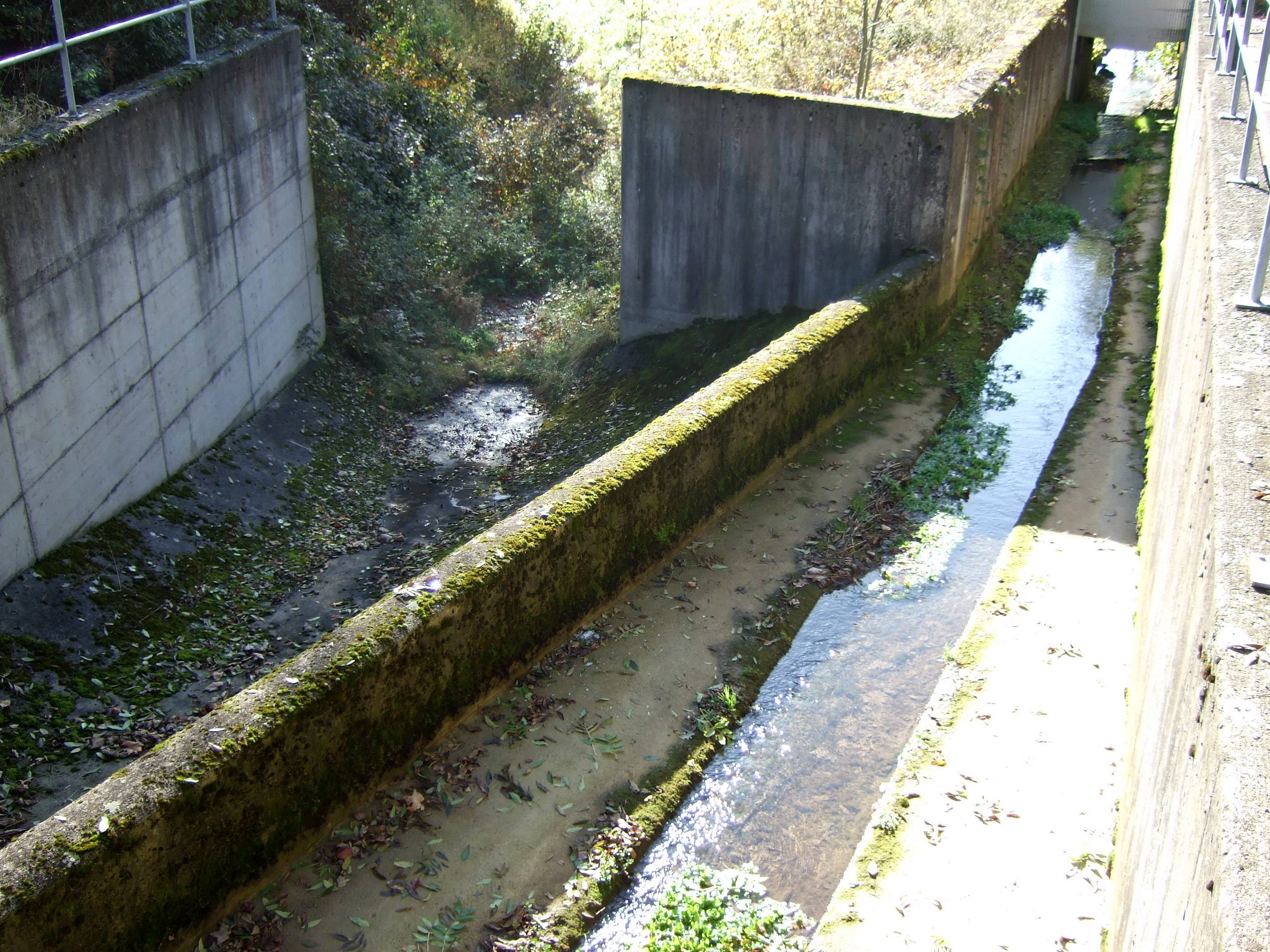
- Aitrach (left) almost dry flowing towards the Danube while the rest of the water flows in Schleifebächle (right) towards the Rhine

- Location of mouth

Location
- Country: Germany
- State: Baden-Württemberg

Physical characteristics
- Mouth
  - location: Danube
  - coordinates: 47.9243°N 8.6759°E
- Length: 15.9 km (9.9 mi)

Basin features
- Progression: Danube→ Black Sea

The Aitrach is a river in Baden-Württemberg, Germany. It is a right tributary of the Danube, which it joins near Geisingen.

== See also ==
- List of rivers of Baden-Württemberg
