= Gillenbach (Schussen) =

River in Germany

Location
- Country: Germany
- States: Baden-Württemberg

Physical characteristics
- Mouth
  - location: Schussen
  - coordinates: 47.7500°N 9.5750°E

Basin features
- Progression: Schussen→ Rhine→ North Sea

Gillenbach (German pronunciation: [ˈɡɪlənbax]) is a river of Baden-Württemberg, Germany. It flows into the Schussen near Ravensburg.

== See also ==
- List of rivers of Baden-Württemberg
