= Schmerbach (Herrgottsbach) =

River in Germany

Location
- Country: Germany
- State: Baden-Württemberg

Schmerbach is a river of Baden-Württemberg, Germany. It is the right headstream of the Herrgottsbach.

== See also ==
- List of rivers of Baden-Württemberg
