= Wildbach (Main) =

River in Germany

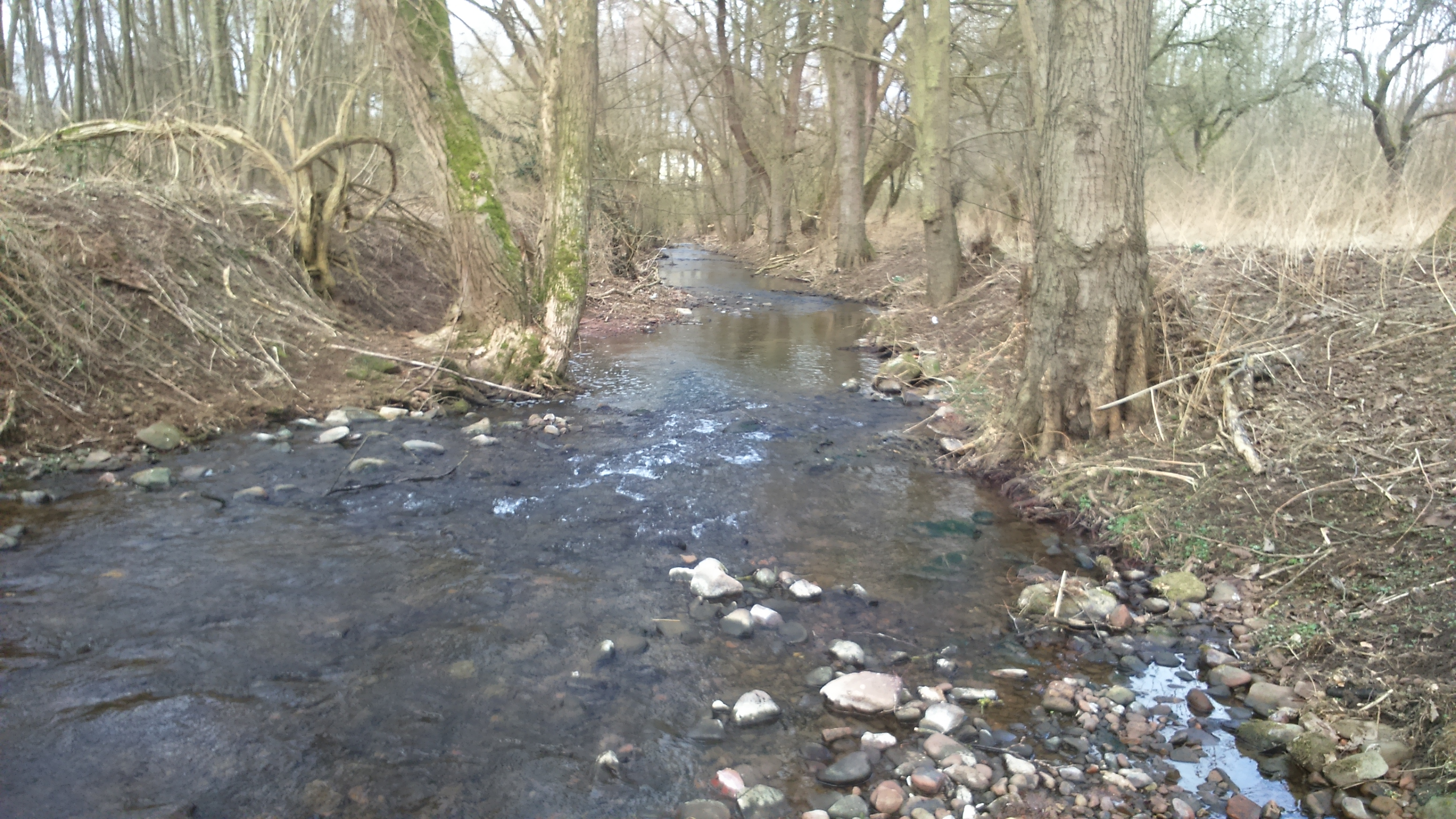

Location
- Country: Germany
- State: Baden-Württemberg

Physical characteristics
- Source
  - elevation: 131 m (430 ft)
- Mouth
  - location: Main
  - coordinates: 49.7733°N 9.3970°E
- Length: 11.4 km (7.1 mi)

Basin features
- Progression: Main→ Rhine→ North Sea

Wildbach (German pronunciation: [ˈvɪltˌbax]) is a river of Baden-Württemberg, Germany. It is 11.4 kilometres (7.1 mi) long and is located in the south-west part of Germany. It is a left tributary of the Main near Stadtprozelten.

== See also ==
- List of rivers of Baden-Württemberg
