= Arbach (Neckar) =

River in Germany

- Location of mouth in Baden-Württemberg

Location
- Country: Germany
- State: Baden-Württemberg

Physical characteristics
- Mouth
  - location: Neckar
  - coordinates: 48.4928°N 9.0011°E

Basin features
- Progression: Neckar→ Rhine→ North Sea

Arbach is a river of Baden-Württemberg, Germany. It is a left tributary of the Neckar near Hirschau.

== See also ==
- List of rivers of Baden-Württemberg
