= Rötelbach (Jagst) =

River in Germany

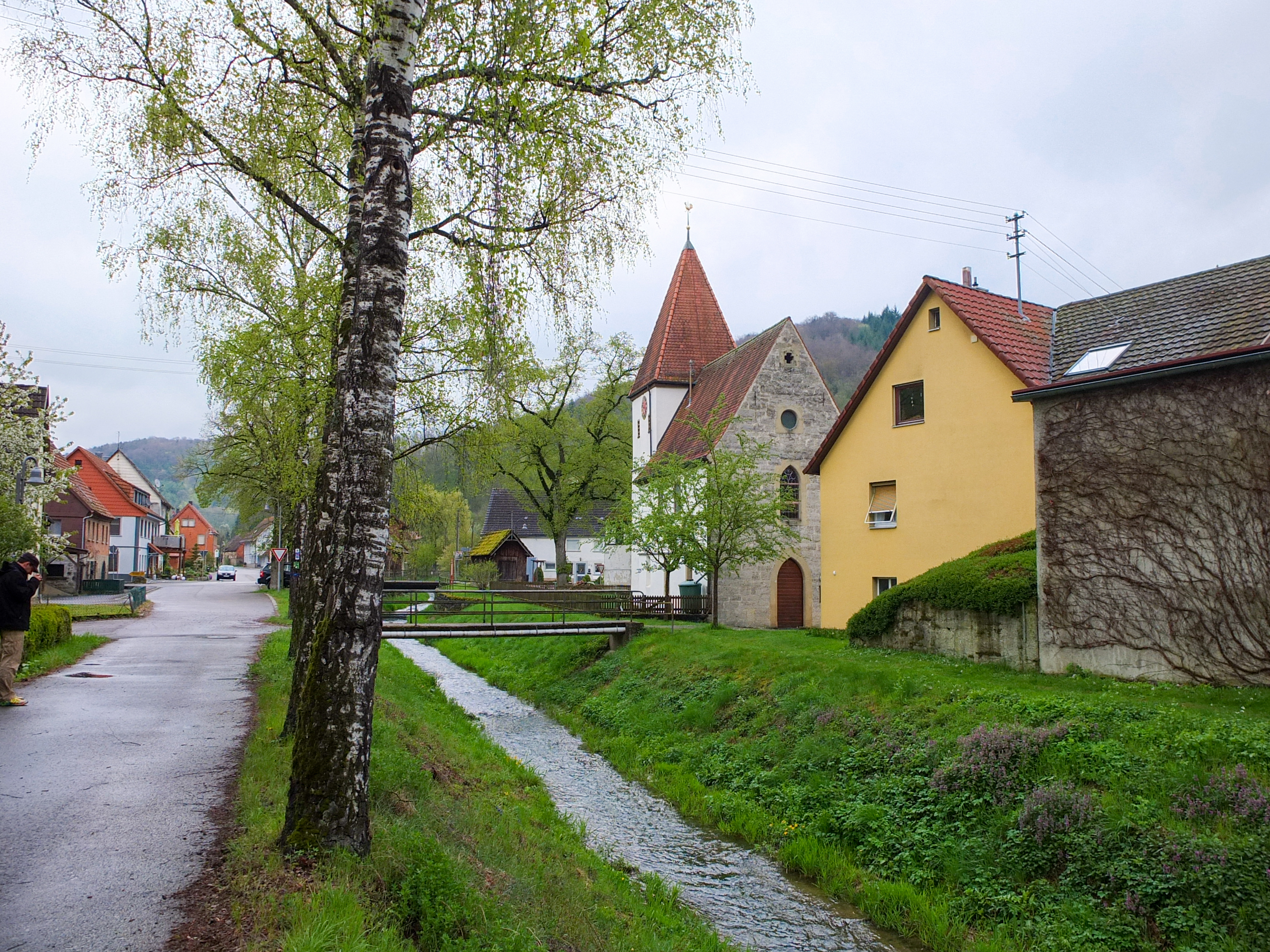

Location
- Country: Germany
- State: Baden-Württemberg

Physical characteristics
- Mouth
  - location: Jagst
  - coordinates: 49.2985°N 9.8258°E
- Length: 9.9 km (6.2 mi)

Basin features
- Progression: Jagst→ Neckar→ Rhine→ North Sea

The Rötelbach is a river of Baden-Württemberg, Germany. It joins the Jagst near Mulfingen.

== Geology ==
The Rötelbach has its source in the Lower Keuper layer, which mostly covers the undulating plateau formed by the Upper Muschelkalk in a thin layer. The stream runs in it after an initially very shallow hollow before it enters the forest. Its rather steep valley then begins in the forest, to which the larger tributaries then flow through the typical landscape of the Klingen. Shortly before the inflow of the Mittelbach, from which it runs roughly westwards, the stream reaches the Middle Muschelkalk, whereupon the valley floor immediately widens noticeably and the open meadow begins. From the outskirts of Eberbach to the nearby estuary, it finally flows in the Lower Muschelkalk. The larger hilltops are often covered by layers of loess derivatives from aeolian deposits in the Quaternary.

== See also ==
- List of rivers of Baden-Württemberg
