= Dentelbach (Steinach) =

River in Germany

Location
- Country: Germany
- State: Baden-Württemberg

Dentelbach is a river of Baden-Württemberg, Germany. It is a left tributary of the Steinach in Neuffen.

== See also ==
- List of rivers of Baden-Württemberg
