= Seckach (Lauchert) =

River in Baden-Württemberg, Germany

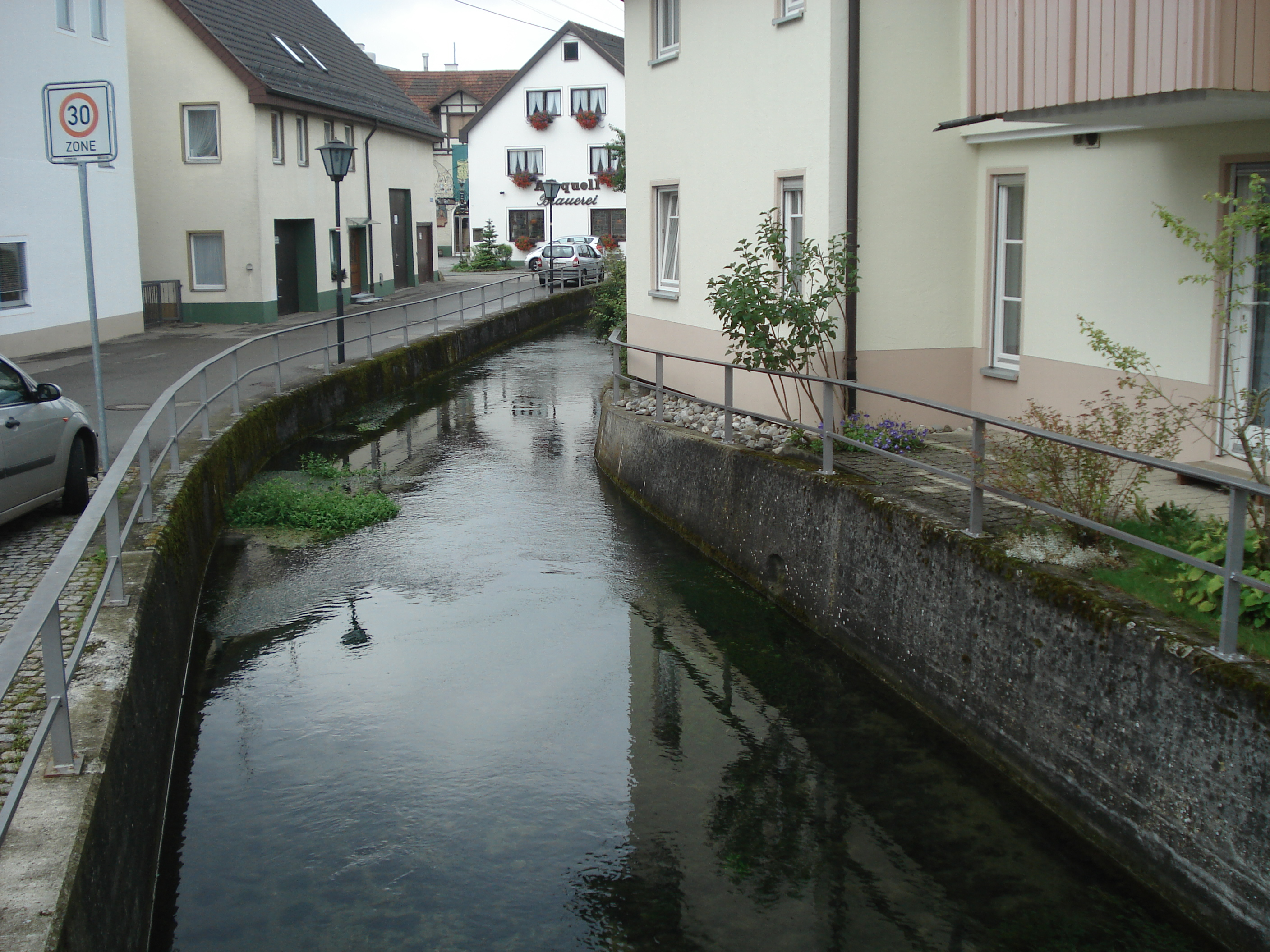

Location
- Country: Germany
- State: Baden-Württemberg

Physical characteristics
- Mouth
  - location: Lauchert
  - coordinates: 48.2837°N 9.2161°E

Basin features
- Progression: Lauchert→ Danube→ Black Sea

Seckach is a small river of Baden-Württemberg, Germany. It flows into the Lauchert in Mägerkingen.

== See also ==
- List of rivers of Baden-Württemberg
