= Zipfelbach (Neckar) =

River in Germany

Kakabach
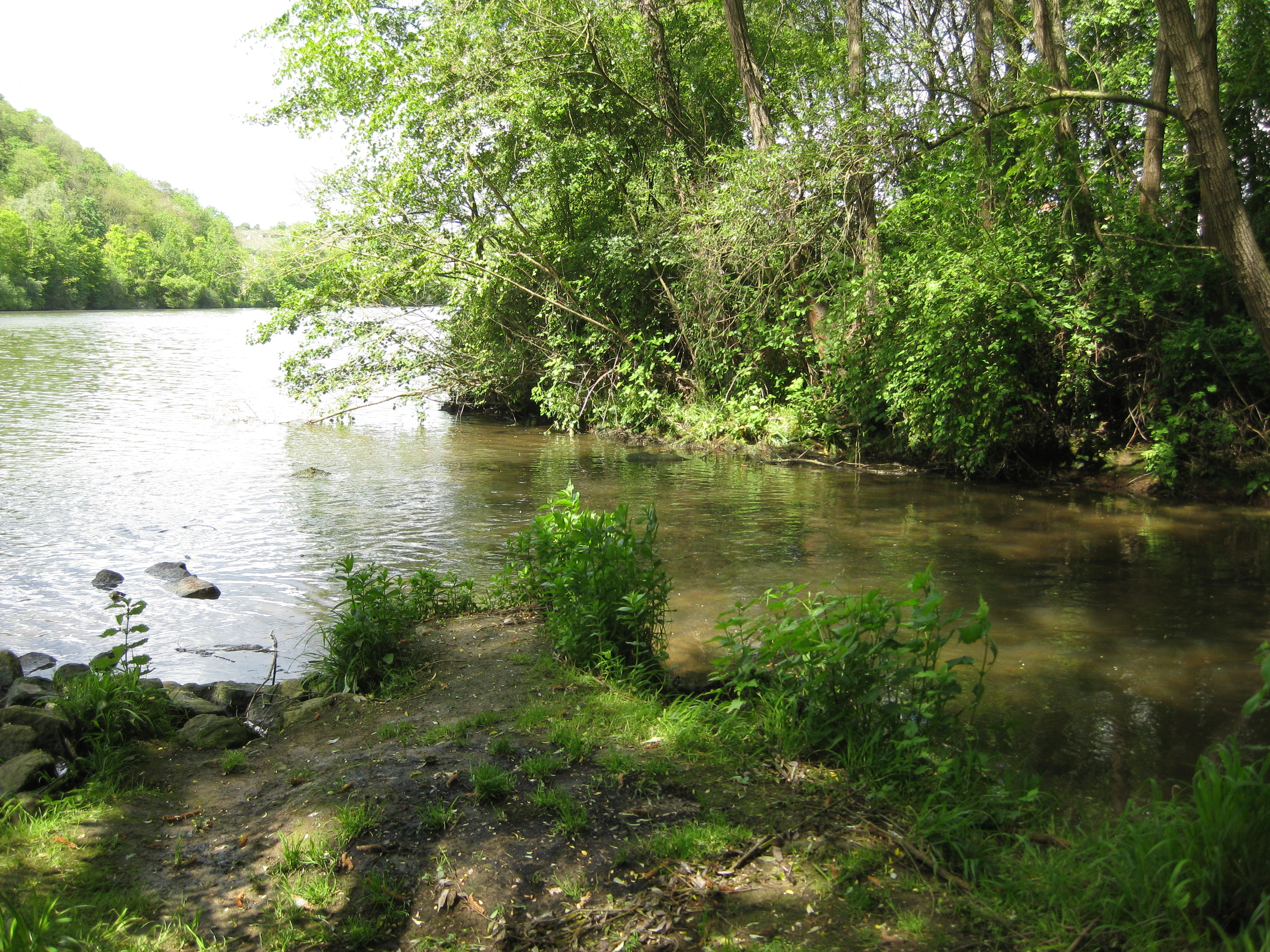
- Confluence of the Zipfelbach

- Mouth of Zipfelbach

Location
- Country: Germany
- State: Baden-Württemberg

Physical characteristics
- Mouth
  - location: Neckar
  - coordinates: 48.9009°N 9.2576°E
- Length: 18.7 km (11.6 mi)

Basin features
- Progression: Neckar→ Rhine→ North Sea

Zipfelbach is a river of Baden-Württemberg, Germany. It is a right tributary of the Neckar near Ludwigsburg.

== See also ==
- List of rivers of Baden-Württemberg
