= Klemmbach =

River in Germany

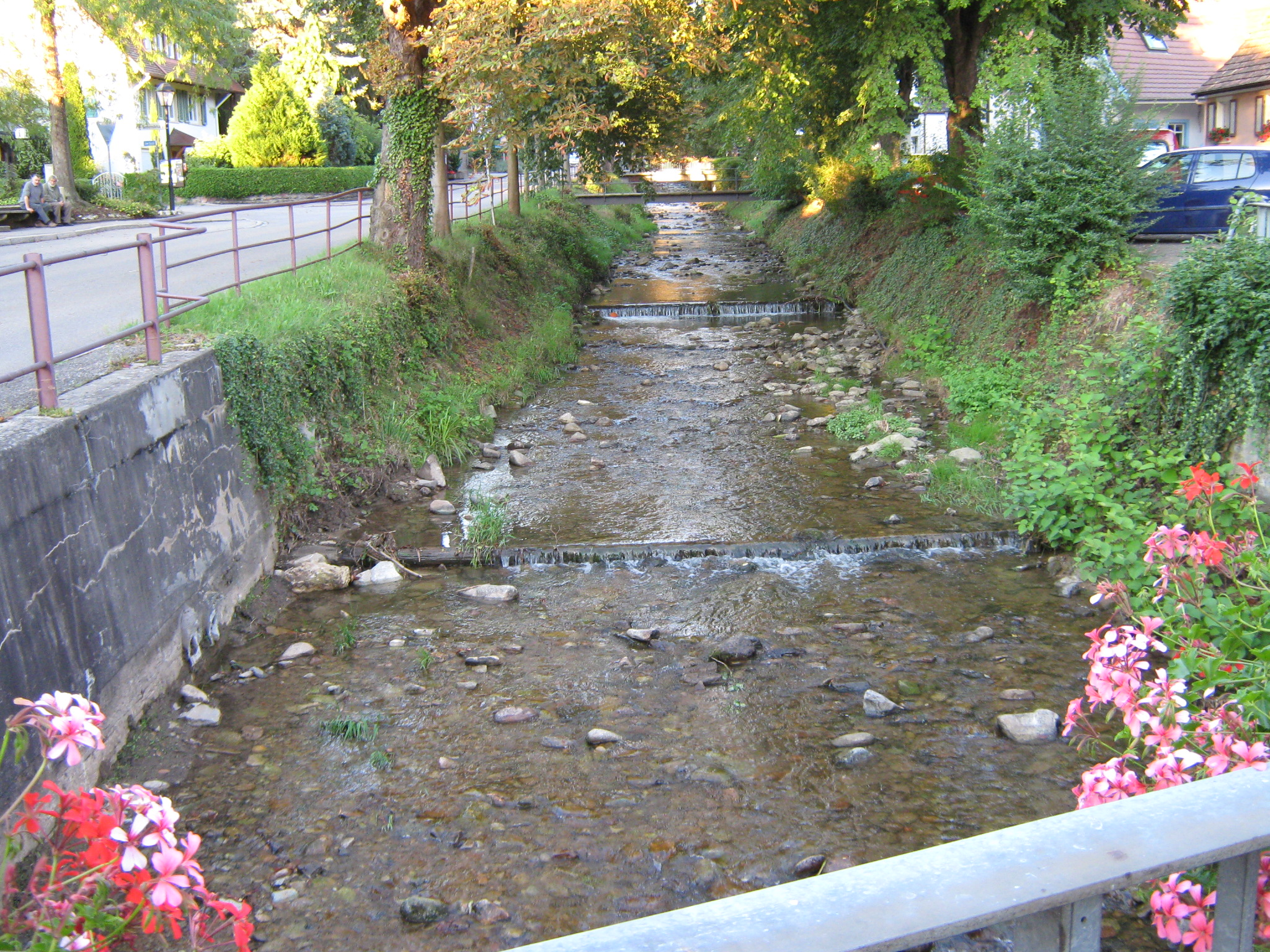

Location
- Country: Germany
- State: Baden-Württemberg

Physical characteristics
- Mouth
  - location: Rhine
  - coordinates: 47.8179°N 7.5483°E
- Length: 20.3 km (12.6 mi)

Basin features
- Progression: Rhine→ North Sea

The Klemmbach is a small Black Forest stream in Baden-Württemberg, Germany.

== Course ==
The Klemmbach is 20.3 kilometers long (12.6 miles). Its source is the southwestern Black Forest near a mountain pass between the summits of Blauen and Belchen.

It flows westward through Badenweiler, Müllheim and Neuenburg and empties into the Rhine in Neuenburg am Rhein.
