= Rötelbach (Danube) =

River in Baden-Württemberg, Germany

Location
- Country: Germany
- State: Baden-Württemberg

Physical characteristics
- Mouth
  - location: Danube
  - coordinates: 48°22′47″N 9°58′02″E
- Length: 10.5 km (6.5 mi)

Basin features
- Progression: Danube→ Black Sea

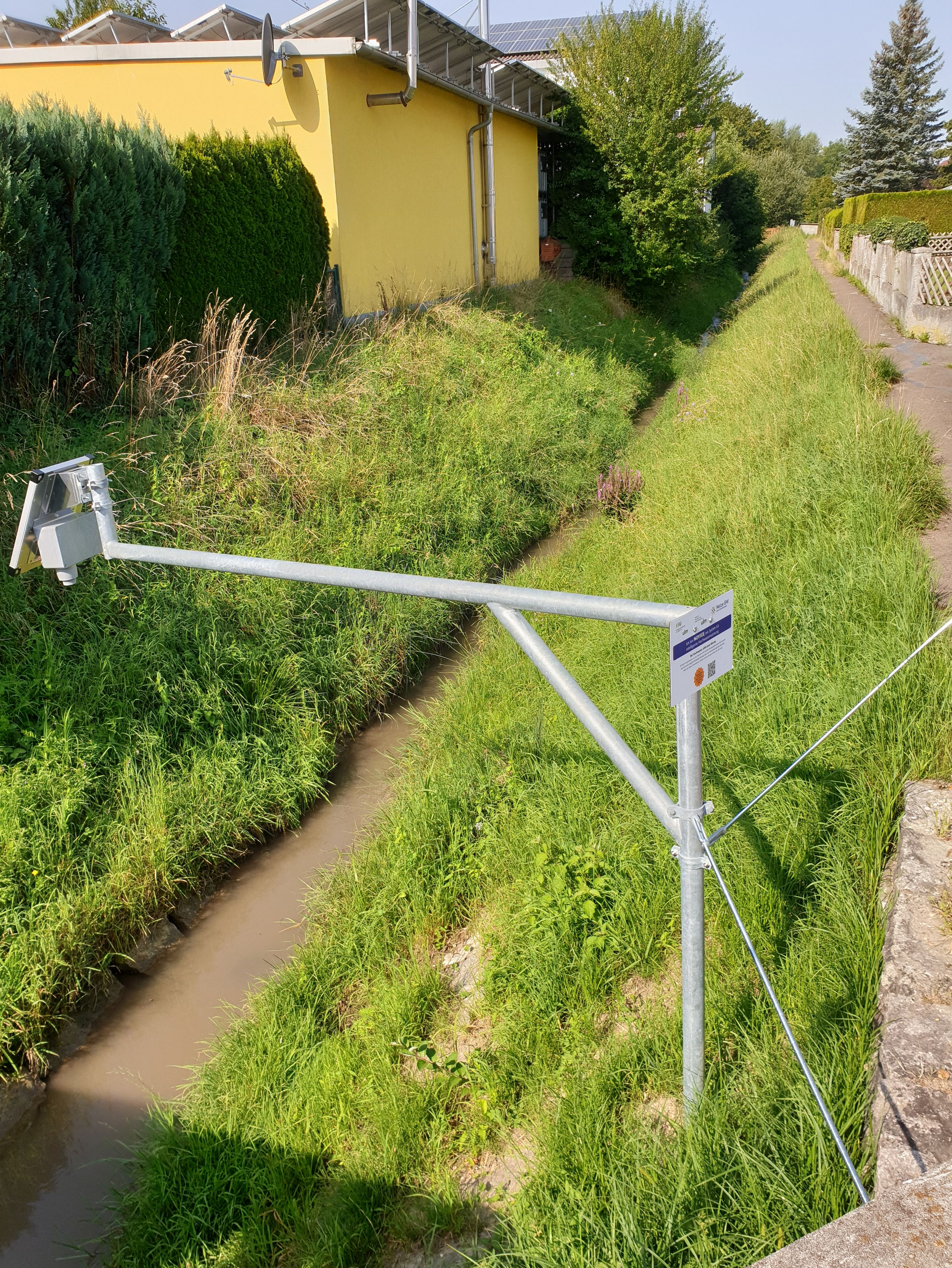
Rötelbach in Einsingen near Ulm, with flood sensor

Rötelbach is a river of Baden-Württemberg, Germany. It flows into the Danube near Ulm.

== See also ==
- List of rivers of Baden-Württemberg
