= Schwäbisch Hall (electoral district) =

State electoral district of Germany

22: Schwäbisch Hall
- Electoral district for the Landtag of Baden-Württemberg
- Schwäbisch Hall in 2026
- District: Schwäbisch Hall
- Electorate: 128,196 (2026)
- Major settlements: Bühlertann, Bühlerzell, Crailsheim, Fichtenau, Fichtenberg, Frankenhardt, Gaildorf, Ilshofen, Kirchberg an der Jagst, Kreßberg, Mainhardt, Michelbach an der Bilz, Michelfeld, Oberrot, Obersontheim, Rosengarten, Rot am See, Satteldorf, Schwäbisch Hall, Stimpfach, Sulzbach-Laufen, Vellberg, Wallhausen, and Wolpertshausen

Current electoral district
- Party: CDU
- Member: Isabell Rathgeb

Schwäbisch Hall is an electoral constituency (German: Wahlkreis) represented in the Landtag of Baden-Württemberg. Since 2026, it has elected one member via first-past-the-post voting. Voters cast a second vote under which additional seats are allocated proportionally state-wide. Under the constituency numbering system, it is designated as constituency 22. It is wholly within the district of Schwäbisch Hall.

== Geography ==
The constituency includes the municipalities of Bühlertann, Bühlerzell, Crailsheim, Fichtenau, Fichtenberg, Frankenhardt, Gaildorf, Ilshofen, Kirchberg an der Jagst, Kreßberg, Mainhardt, Michelbach an der Bilz, Michelfeld, Oberrot, Obersontheim, Rosengarten, Rot am See, Satteldorf, Schwäbisch Hall, Stimpfach, Sulzbach-Laufen, Vellberg, Wallhausen, and Wolpertshausen, within the district of Schwäbisch Hall.

There were 128,196 eligible voters in 2026.

== Members ==
=== First mandate ===
Both prior to and since the electoral reforms for the 2026 election, the winner of the plurality of the vote (first-past-the-post) in every constituency won the first mandate.

Election	Member	Party	%
1976	Hermann Opferkuch	CDU	
1980	Hermann Opferkuch	CDU	
1984	Ernst Keitel	CDU	
1988	Ernst Keitel	CDU	
1992	Ernst Keitel	CDU	
1996	Ernst Keitel	CDU	
2001	Helmut Walter Rüeck	CDU	31.4
2006	Helmut Walter Rüeck	CDU	38.3
2011	Helmut Walter Rüeck	CDU	35.4
2016	Jutta Niemann	Grüne	27.5
2021	Jutta Niemann	Grüne	28.7
2026	Isabell Rathgeb	CDU	37.2

=== Second mandate ===
Prior to the electoral reforms for the 2026 election, the seats in the state parliament were allocated proportionately amongst parties which received more than 5% of valid votes across the state. The seats that were won proportionally for parties that did not win as many first mandates as seats they were entitled to, were allocated to their candidates which received the highest proportion of the vote in their respective constituencies. This meant that following some elections, a constituency would have one or more members elected under a second mandate.

Prior to 2011, these second mandates were allocated to the party candidates who got the greatest number of votes, whilst from 2011-2021, these were allocated according to percentage share of the vote.

Election	Member	Party	Member	Party	Member	Party
1976	Ulrich Lang	SPD				
1980	Ulrich Lang	SPD				
1984	Ulrich Lang	SPD				
1988	Ulrich Lang	SPD	Walter Döring	FDP		
1992	Walter Müller	SPD	Walter Döring	FDP		
1996	Walter Müller	SPD	Walter Döring	FDP	Alexander Schonath	REP
2001	Nikolaos Sakellariou	SPD	Walter Döring	FDP		
2006	Nikolaos Sakellariou	SPD	Friedrich Bullinger	FDP		
2011	Nikolaos Sakellariou	SPD	Friedrich Bullinger	FDP		
2016			Friedrich Bullinger	FDP	Udo Stein	AfD
Aug 2018			Stephen Brauer	FDP	Udo Stein	AfD
2021			Stephen Brauer	FDP	Udo Stein	AfD
Sep 2025			Silvia Hapke-Lenz	FDP	Udo Stein	AfD

== Election results ==
=== 2026 election ===
State election (2026): Schwäbisch Hall
Notes:	Blue background denotes the winner of the electorate vote. Pink background denotes a candidate elected from their party list. Yellow background denotes an electorate win by a list member, or other incumbent. A ✓ or ✗ denotes status of any incumbent, win or lose respectively.						
Party	Candidate	Votes	%	±%	Party votes	%	±%
CDU	Isabell Rathgeb	31,575	37.2	▲14.0	26,268	30.9	▲7.7
AfD	Udo Stein	18,572	21.9	▲9.4	19,205	22.6	▲10.1
Greens	Lea Geldner	17,858	21.0	▼7.6	22,997	27.0	▼1.6
SPD	Danny Multani	4,978	5.9	▼5.5	4,164	4.9	▼6.5
FDP	Luca Kongeter	3,201	3.8	▼9.4	3,602	4.2	▼8.9
Left	Ellena Nilima Schumacher-Koelsch	3,188	3.8	▲0.4	2,761	3.2	▼0.1
FW	Maximiliam Lugwig	2,228	2.8	▲0.8	1,478	1.7	▼0.1
BSW	Matthias Straub	1,696	2.0		1,456	1.7	
APT					702	0.8	
Volt	Maximilian Teuber	660	0.8		460	0.5	
PARTEI					398	0.5	▼1.3
Bündnis C	Torsten Krause	514	0.6		391	0.5	
dieBasis					377	0.4	▼1.3
ÖDP	Sylvain Roman	397	0.5	▼0.8	221	0.3	▼1.0
Values					171	0.2	
Pensioners					114	0.1	
Team Todenhöfer					76	0.1	
Verjüngungsforschung					57	0.1	
PdF					53	0.1	
Humanists					41	0.0	
KlimalisteBW					32	0.0	▼0.5
Informal votes		713			556		
Total valid votes		84,867			85,024		
Turnout		85,580	66.8	▲5.3			
CDU gain from Greens	Majority	13,003	15.3				

=== 2021 election ===
State election (2026): Schwäbisch Hall
Party	Candidate	Votes	%	±%
Greens	Jutta Niemann	22,003	28.7	▲1.2
CDU	Isabell Rathgeb	17,808	23.2	▲0.2
FDP	Stephen Brauer	10,082	13.1	▲1.8
AfD	Udo Stein	9,606	12.5	▼5.3
SPD	Nikolaos Sakellariou	8,716	11.3	▼2.7
Left	Ellena Schumacher-Koelsch	2,560	3.3	▲0.9
FW	Markus Elsasser	1,421	1.9	
PARTEI	Tillmann Finger	1,358	1.8	
dieBasis	Andreas Baum	1,343	1.7	
ÖDP	Peter Gansky	967	1.3	Steady
WiR2020	Max Weber	527	0.7	
KlimalisteBW	Markus Damson	402	0.5	
Majority		4,195	5.5	
Rejected ballots		622	0.8	▼0.3
Turnout		77,415	61.5	▼6.0
Registered electors		125,970		
Greens hold		Swing		

== See also ==
- Politics of Baden-Württemberg
- Landtag of Baden-Württemberg
