= Gerabronn =

- Town
- Coat of arms

- Location of Gerabronn within Schwäbisch Hall district
- Interactive map of Gerabronn
- Location within Germany Location within Baden-Württemberg
- Coordinates: 49°14′58″N 09°55′13″E
- Country: Germany
- State: Baden-Württemberg
- Admin. region: Stuttgart
- District: Schwäbisch Hall
- Subdivisions: 5 Stadtteile

Government
  - Mayor: Vacant

Area
  - Total: 40.38 km^{2} (15.59 sq mi)
- Elevation: 460 m (1,510 ft)

Population (2025-12-31)
  - Total: 4,389
  - Density: 108.7/km^{2} (281.5/sq mi)
- Time zone: UTC+01:00 (CET)
  - Summer (DST): UTC+02:00 (CEST)
- Postal codes: 74582
- Dialling codes: 07952
- Vehicle registration: SHA
- Website: www.gerabronn.de

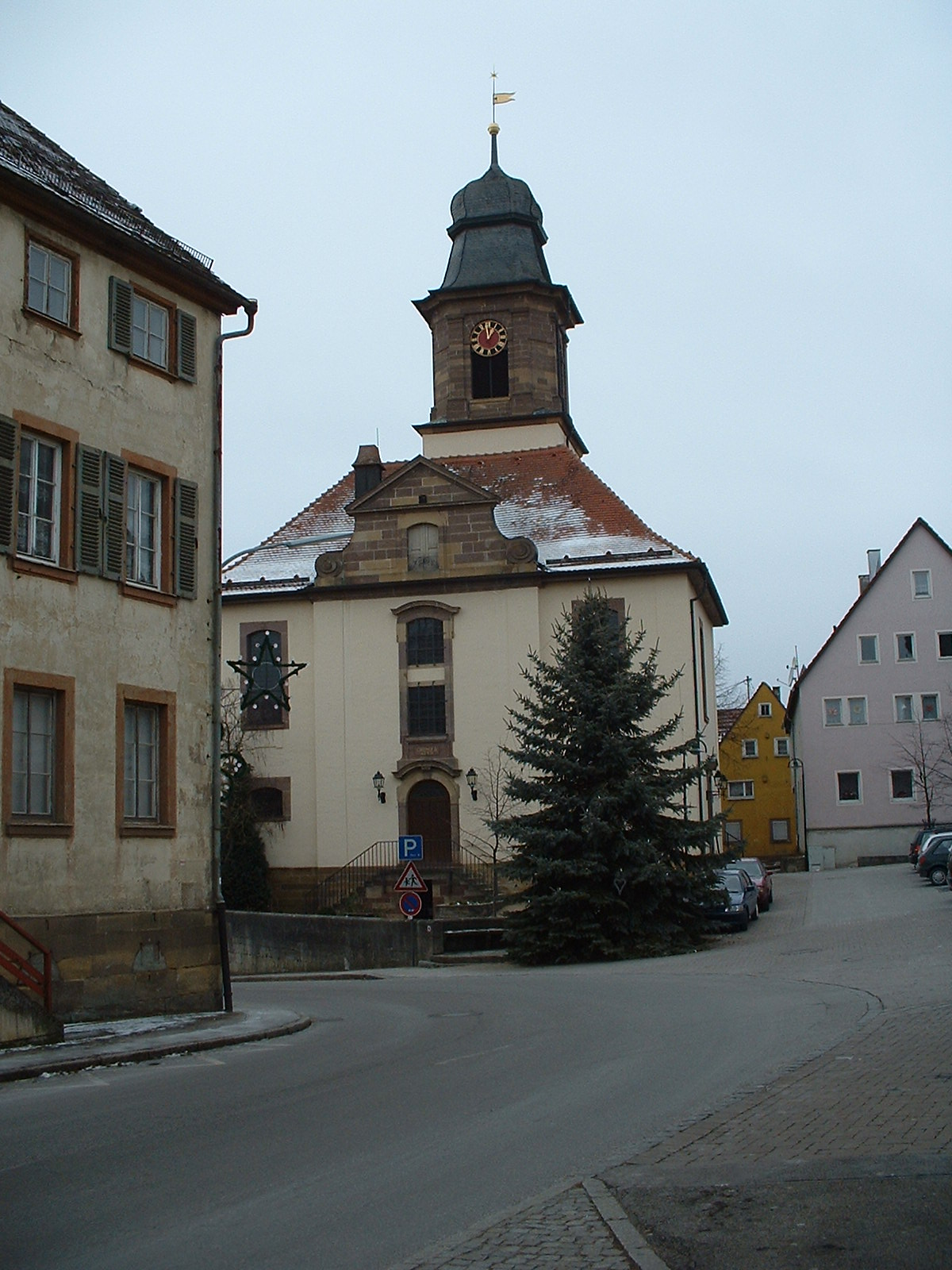
The Protestant church in Gerabronn

Gerabronn (German pronunciation: [ɡeːʁaˈbʁɔn]) is a small town in the county of Schwäbisch Hall, Baden-Württemberg, Germany. In 2006 it had a population of about 4,547 and covered an area of 40.38 km^{2}.

Gerabronn is the home town of the two leading German politicians of the Green Party: Joschka Fischer and Rezzo Schlauch.

== History ==
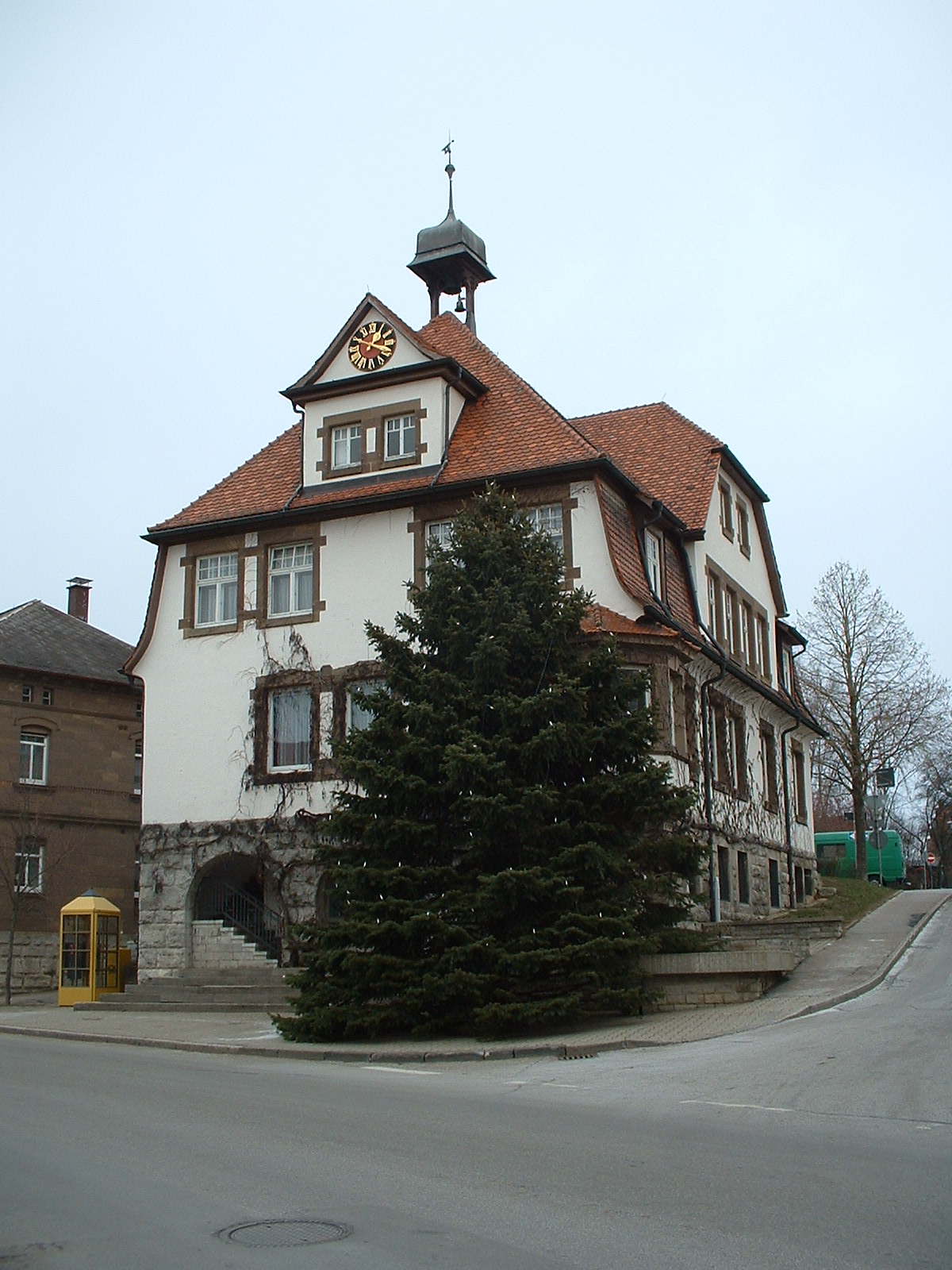
Town hall

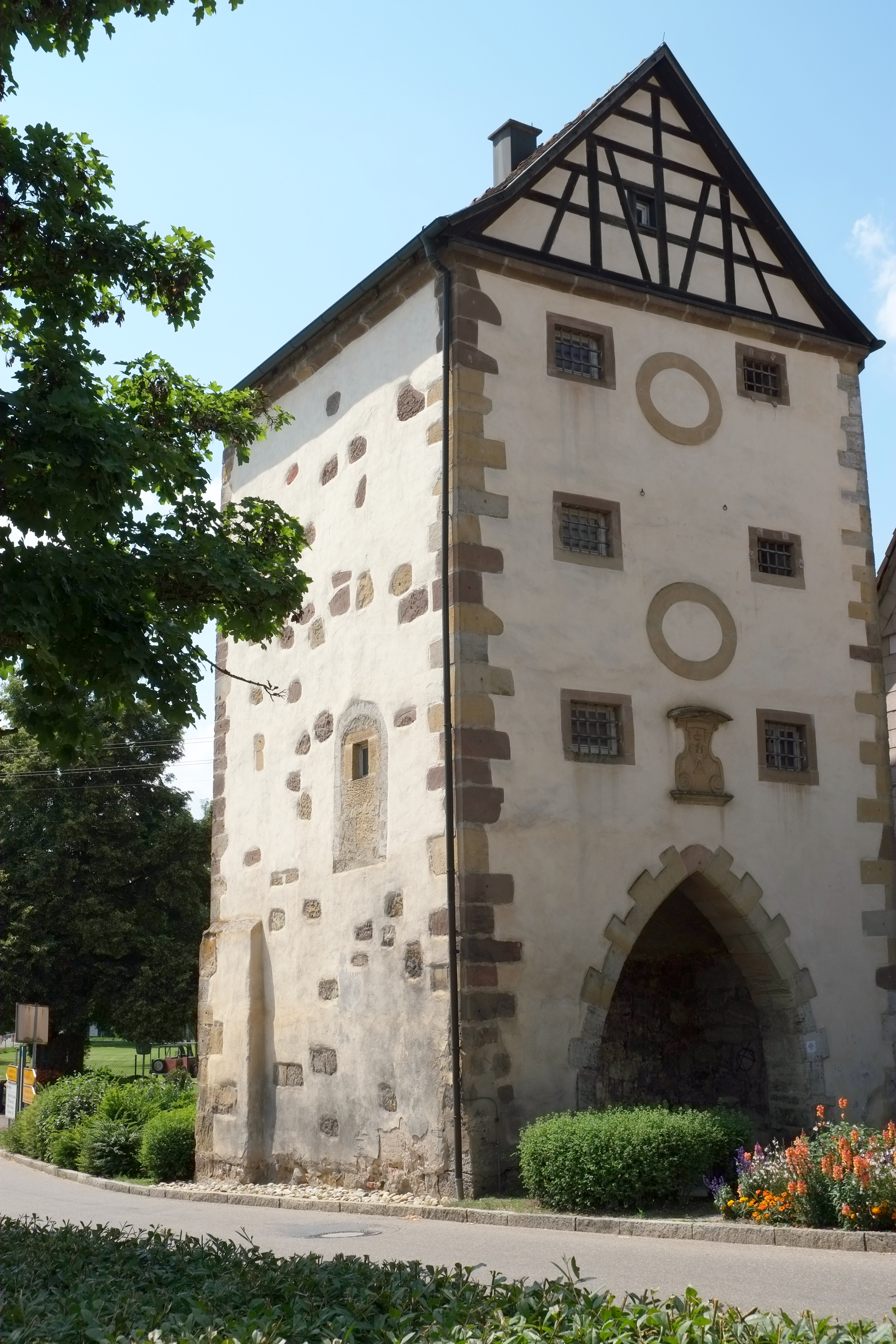
Gerabronn Town gate

Gerabronn developed from a village, which was supposedly founded in the 10th century. Originally named Gerhiltebrunnen (well of Gerhilt), it was also called Gerolzbrunn, Geroldbrunn, Gerltbrunn or Gerhartsbrunn, until in the 17th century the current name became common. The village was first mentioned in a 1226 feud letter, when the area came under the control of the Bishop of Würzburg.

Until the 19th century Gerabronn was only a village; thereafter it became a town (Oberamtsstadt) in 1811 it was responsible for the administration of the surrounding area. Industrialization and a connection to the railway further helped the growth of the town. In 1938 the Amt was dissolved and became part of the county of Crailsheim, which in 1972 was included into the county of Schwäbisch Hall. In 1972–75, the previously independent municipalities of Amlishagen, Dünsbach and Michelbach/Heide, as well as Ober- and Unterweiler from the municipality of Wittenweiler, were included into the town.

== Overview ==
Gerabronn lies in 422 up to 460 meters height on a hill on the Hohenlohe Plain.

Neighbouring municipalities

The town borders in the north on Blaufelden, in the east on Rot am See, in the south on the towns of Kirchberg an der Jagst and Ilshofen and in the west on Langenburg.

City Districts

From 1972 until 1975, the municipalities of Amlishagen, Dünsbach and Michelbach/Heide as well as Oberweiler und Unterweiler from the municipality of Wittenweiler were annexed following the municipal reform.

== Coat of arms ==
The coat of arms shows the quartered black-and-white shield of the Hohenzollern family, who were the Viscounts of Nürnberg when the coat of arms was granted to the town in 1545. To distinguish the coats of arms of the family and the town two vaulting horses were added, as horse breeding was popular in the town historically. Originally the horses were displayed on the black quarters, but in 1902 they were placed on the silver quarters, the design being made official in 1953.

== Sons and daughters of the town ==
- Joschka Fischer (born 1948), politician (Alliance 90 / The Greens), Federal Foreign Minister and Vice Chancellor 1998–2005
