= Blinde Rot =

River in Germany

Blinde Rot Adelmannsfelder Rot
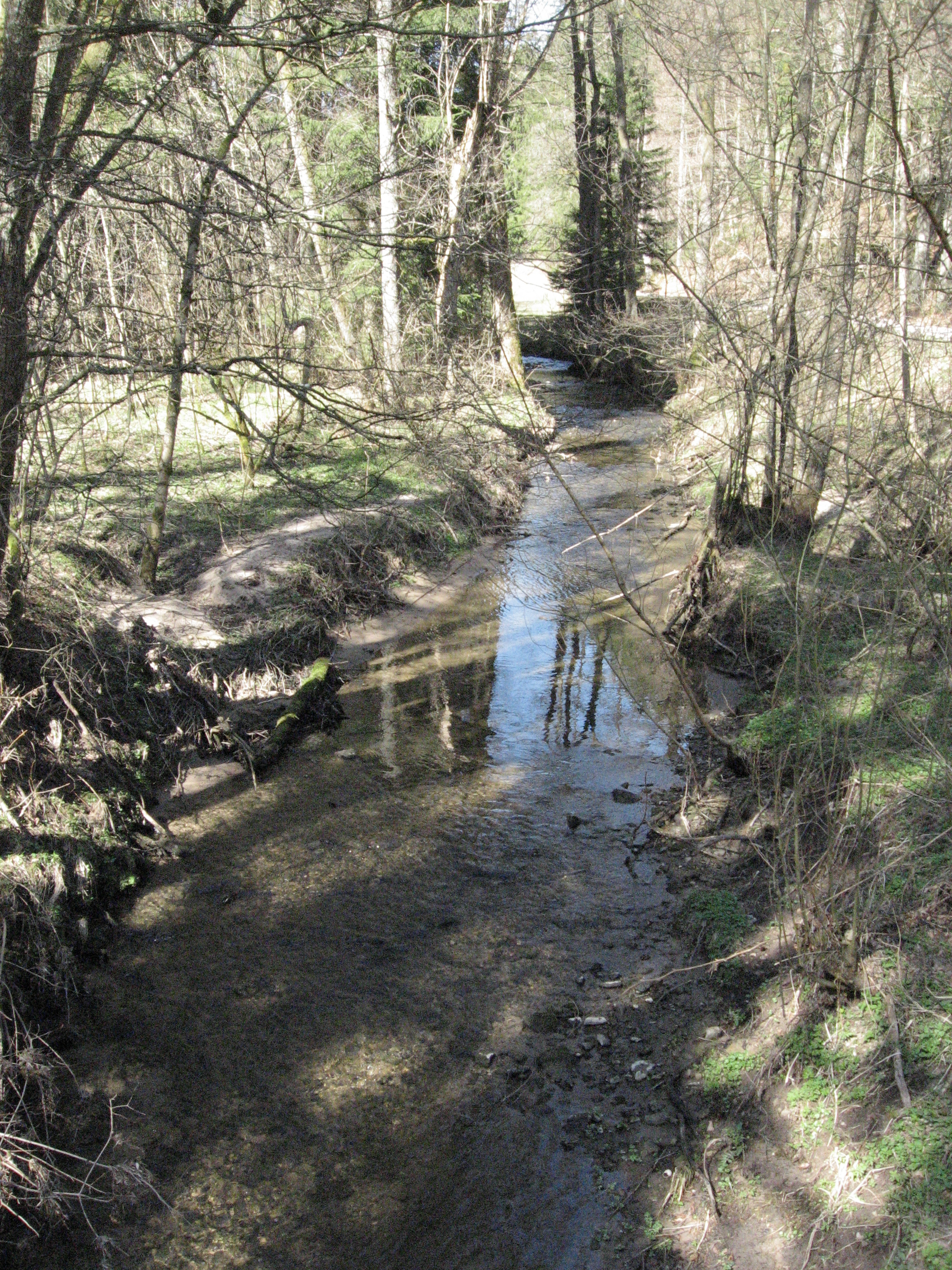
- Blinde Rot near Bühlerzell

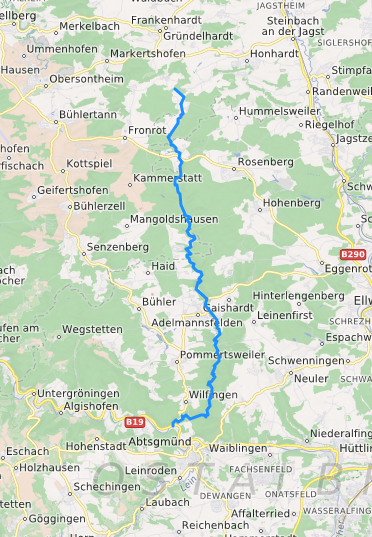
- The course of the Blinde Rot

Location
- Country: Germany
- State: Baden-Württemberg

Physical characteristics
- Source
  - location: Near Vorderuhlberg, Frankenhardt municipality
  - coordinates: 49°03′21″N 9°59′22″E
  - elevation: c. 503 metres (1,650 ft)
- Mouth
  - location: Kocher, near Schäufele, Abtsgmünd municipality
  - coordinates: 48°54′15″N 9°59′16″E
  - elevation: c. 363 metres (1,191 ft)
- Length: 28.5 kilometres (17.7 mi)
- Basin size: 60.7 km^{2} (23.4 mi^{2})

Basin features
- Progression: Kocher→ Neckar→ Rhine→ North Sea
- Waterbodies: Fleckenbachsee, Betzenweiher

The Blinde Rot, also called the Adelmannsfelder Rot, is a river in the Ellwangen Hills in the north of the German state of Baden-Württemberg, that rises in the municipality Frankenhardt and discharges into the Kocher in the municipality of Abtsgmünd.

== Geography ==
The Blinde Rot rises on the gravel sandstone plateau on the northern foothills of the Ellwangen Hills, flows shortly thereafter through the lake of Fleckenbachsee and then meanders southwards through river meadows, before swinging abruptly west in front of the Hornberg hill, about 2 km before emptying into the Kocher near Schäufele.

The whole length of its valley lies on the Middle Keuper rocks. Its neighbouring rivers, which run through valleys roughly parallel to the Blinde Rot to the west as east, the Bühler and the Jagst, both flow in the opposite direction, i.e. to the north.

=== Tributaries ===
The tributaries of the Blinde Rot from source to mouth are:

Name	Length (km)	Orientation	Confluence elevation (m above sea level)	Confluence location	Source / course
Kohlenbach	0.6	right	486	southwest of Frankenhardt-Ipshof	from the eastern Schäfer, ends in the Fleckenbachsee
Kaltenbach	2.2	right	469	after the pond of Betzenweiher at Rosenberg-Betzenhof	from the western Schäfer
Forellenbach	1.9	right	467	between Rosenberg and Betzenhof-Zollhof	from the Strut
Höllholzbach	1.1	right	461	opposite Rosenberg-Zollhof	flows through the Brunnenklinge
Eisenbach	1.7	left	459	south of Rosenberg-Zollhof	from the Eisennagel
Kaltenbach	1.2	left	456	opposite Rosenberg-Uhlenhof	from Birkhof
Neumüllerswaldbach	0.8	left	451	opposite the southern edge of Rosenberg-Ludwigsmühle	from northern Vogelbuck
Vogelkingenbach	1.1	left	449	below and opposite Rosenberg-Ludwigsmühle	from southern Vogelbuck
Stream through the Wolfsklinge	1.3	right	448	400 m SSW of Rosenberg- Ludwigsmühle	from the west bend in the K 2628 road
Stream through the Wolfsklinge	0.7	left	442	southwest of the Old Castle	
Fuchsbach	1.6	left	439		flows through the Fuchsklinge
Dollesbach	2.6	right	438		from Bühlerzell-Kammerstadt, flows through the lake of Treibsee
Scherrbach	1.6	right	436		from Spatzenhof
Einsiedelsbach or perhaps the Einsiedelbach	2.1	left	435	at the sign where the 49th latitude and 10th longitude intersect	from Rosenberg-Hohenberg
Stream through the Höfelesklinge	1.0	right	430	400 m NNE of Bühlerzell-Röhmen	
Stadelsbach	4.1	left	425	at Bühlerzell's Röhmen saw mill	from Rosenberg-Zumholz
Heidenfeldbach	0.8	right	425	east of Bühlerzell-Grafenhof at the sewage farm	
Buchweiherbach	0.9	right	417	southeast of Adelmannsfelden-Mittelwald	Outflow of 0.8 hectare pond of Buchenweiher at Adelmannsfelden-Mittelwald
Waldbach	2.4	left	415	east opposite the Adelmannsfelden-Vorderwald Sommerhalde	from Rosenberg-Hinterbrand
Geißbach	1.9	left	412	opposite Vorderwald along the municipal boundary from Adelmannsfelden to Neuler at a track bridge over the Blinde Rot	Source region south of Rosenberg-Hütten
Tributary at the old Herrenmühle mill	0.5	right	408	at the feet of Adelmannsfelden-Ottenhof	
(Tributary)	0.6	right	407	between Ottenhof and Adelmannsfelden-Dollishäusle	
Klingenbach	1.1	right	405	Bridge on the L 1073 from Neuler-Gaishardt to Adelmannsfelden	rises in the western urban area of Adelmannsfelden, passes through the klinge between the village and north Dollishäusle
Haldenbach	3.0	left	398	Adelmannsfelden Paper Mill	rises northeast of Gaishardt
Klingenbach (!)	1.3	left	395		begins below Neuler-Leinenfirster Teufelskanzel
Fürtlebach	1.2	right	390	400 m south of Neuler-Burghardsmühle	begins south of Abtsgmünd-Herrenwald
Hartenbach	1.9	left	389		Source area in Neuler-Pfaffenhölzle
Jungholz Bach	0.5	right	385		
Franzbach	1.7	right	385		begins east of Abtsgmünd-Pommertsweiler
Zobelsbach	1.4	left	383		from Neuler-Ramsenstrut
Rotwiesenbach	0.6	right	383		from the Gschäl
Fischbach	3.0	right	380		from the eastern slopes of the Büchelberger Grat
Bach through the Birkenklinge	0.5	left	378	Abtsgmünd oil and sawmill	from the Zanken
Ölmühlbach	0.6	right	378	Abtsgmünd oil and sawmill	from Abtsgmünd-Unterwilflingen
Höftbach	1.0	left	375		from Neuler-Binderhof
Götzenreutebach	0.5	right	374		from Geigersberg
Geigersbergbach	0.4	left	374	at Westknick	
Buchhaldenbach	0.6	left	371		from the northwestern slope of the Hornberg, empties into a side branch
Forchenwald Bach	0.6	right	368		from Geigersberg. Mouth in the "Valley of the Blinde Rot" nature reserve
Kotenbach	1.2	right	367	northeast of Abtsgmünd-Schäufele	from southeast Wilflingen

== Environment and protected areas ==
The Blinde Rot initially flows through a very shallow depression, but from about Willa it cut more deeply and nowhere exceeds a maximum width of 150 metres. Mostly enclosed on both sides by wooded slopes, a small-scale, natural river landscape has survived on the valley floor. Pastures and meadows alternate here with woods, including elsewhere rare carrs. The river winds freely through both in natural meanders with steep and gently banks, accompanied by sandbanks, oxbow lakes and pools that are slowly silting up. The upper reaches, the valley from the village of Bühlerzell to the hamlet of Grafenhof, are designated as a protected landscape. This reserve was formed by a local act issued by the Ostalbkreis district office on 5 May 1994 and covers an area of 358 hectares. Immediately thereafter until the Burghardmühle mill below Adelmannsfelden is the protected landscape known as the "Valley of the Blinde Rot". It covers 84.5 hectares and was established on 20 December 1968.

== Fauna ==
The nature reserve of the Valley of the Blinde Rot (Naturschutzgebiet Tal der Blinde Rot) is a habitat rich in fauna. In the valley, 28 breeding bird species have been observed, including the white-throated dipper, the common kingfisher, the Eurasian woodcock and the marsh warbler. Two reptiles are native here: the viviparous lizard and slowworm, and the 7 species of amphibian include the fire salamander and yellow-bellied toad. In the waters of the Blinde Rot live the rare river trout and the endangered brook lamprey, and on the floodplain are numerous species of butterfly and dragonfly.

== Flora ==
The banks of the Blinde Rot are lined with black alder (Alnus glutinosa) and willows, and the low-intensity farmed wet meadows nearby still grow Globeflower (Trollius europaeus). Other wetland plants growing here include flat-sedge and several sedges, including yellow sedge, greater tussock sedge, downy-fruited sedge and true fox sedge. In the wetlands to find the source bulrush and various sedges like the Yellow, the tassel visible, the felt and the fox sedge. Orchids found in the valley include the broad-leaved marsh orchid (Dactylorhiza majalis), the early marsh orchid (Dactylorhiza incarnata) and the rare green-winged orchid (Anacamptis morio). Wolf’s-bane (Aconitum lycoctonum) and the common columbine (Aquilegia vulgaris) also occur.

== Water quality ==
The blind was red with 2004 levels detected over her for this run from about the inflow of Geißbachs lightly loaded (class I-II).

== History ==
In the catchment area, which is more than half covered by forests, forestry was formerly predominantly characterised by charcoal burning, resins, and especially the extraction of timber. It was processed in sawmills into sawn timber, but most of it was used as fuel, turned into firewood for those living in the valley. Most of the timber from the forests was transported along the Blinde Rot and Kocher to Schwäbisch Hall where the saltworks had a great demand for firewood.

== Sights and structures ==
- Fleckenbachsee lake and Fleckenbach Sawmill
- Middle reaches of the river with oxbow lakes, sandstone rocks and several steep side valleys
- St. James' pilgrimage church in Hohenberg in Rosenberg about 3 km east of the river at a height of 568 metres on the Zeugenberg
- Adelmannsfelden Castle

== Economy ==
Waterpower used to be used in the valley of the Blinde Rot to drive several sawmills, paper and oil mills. There is still a small sawmill at Betzenhof. On the Ludwigsmühle below Willa is a medium-sized woodmill. Hydropower is still used today at four locations in the valley.

== Importance as a transport route ==
In the valley, there are hardly any roads along the river. Apart from, the L 1060 at Willa and the L 1073 in Adelmannsfelden are no maintained roads of more than local significance.

== See also ==
- List of rivers of Baden-Württemberg
