= Schnelldorf =

- Municipality
- Coat of arms

- Location of Schnelldorf within Ansbach district
- Interactive map of Schnelldorf
- Location within Germany Location within Bavaria
- Coordinates: 49°12′N 10°10′E
- Country: Germany
- State: Bavaria
- Admin. region: Mittelfranken
- District: Ansbach
- Subdivisions: 10 Ortsteile

Government
  - Mayor (2020–26): Tobias Strauß

Area
  - Total: 51.48 km^{2} (19.88 sq mi)
- Elevation: 470 m (1,540 ft)

Population (2025-12-31)
  - Total: 3,568
  - Density: 69.31/km^{2} (179.5/sq mi)
- Time zone: UTC+01:00 (CET)
  - Summer (DST): UTC+02:00 (CEST)
- Postal codes: 91625
- Dialling codes: 07950
- Vehicle registration: AN
- Website: www.schnelldorf.de

Schnelldorf is a municipality in the district of Ansbach in Mittelfranken in Bavaria in Germany. It neighbours to Feuchtwangen, Wörnitz and Wettringen (Mittelfranken) in Bavaria and Rot am See, Wallhausen, Baden-Württemberg, Satteldorf and Kreßberg
