= Satteldorf =

- Municipality
- Coat of arms

- Location of Satteldorf within Schwäbisch Hall district
- Interactive map of Satteldorf
- Location within Germany Location within Baden-Württemberg
- Coordinates: 49°10′05″N 10°04′51″E
- Country: Germany
- State: Baden-Württemberg
- Admin. region: Stuttgart
- District: Schwäbisch Hall
- Subdivisions: 25 Ortsteile

Government
  - Mayor (2022–30): Thomas Haas

Area
  - Total: 46.21 km^{2} (17.84 sq mi)
- Elevation: 421 m (1,381 ft)

Population (2025-12-31)
  - Total: 5,666
  - Density: 122.6/km^{2} (317.6/sq mi)
- Time zone: UTC+01:00 (CET)
  - Summer (DST): UTC+02:00 (CEST)
- Postal codes: 74589
- Dialling codes: 07951
- Vehicle registration: SHA
- Website: www.satteldorf.de

Satteldorf (German pronunciation: [ˈzatl̩ˌdɔʁf]) is a municipality in the district of Schwäbisch Hall in Baden-Württemberg in Germany.

== Geography ==
Satteldorf is located on the Hohenloher level on the Jagst, a right tributary of the Neckar, about 4 km north of Crailsheim. The eastern districts are located directly on the Frankenhöhe. The municipality is bordered to the north by Wallhausen , to the east by the Bavarian municipality of Schnelldorf, to the southeast by Kreßberg, to the south by Crailsheim and to the west by the town of Kirchberg an der Jagst.

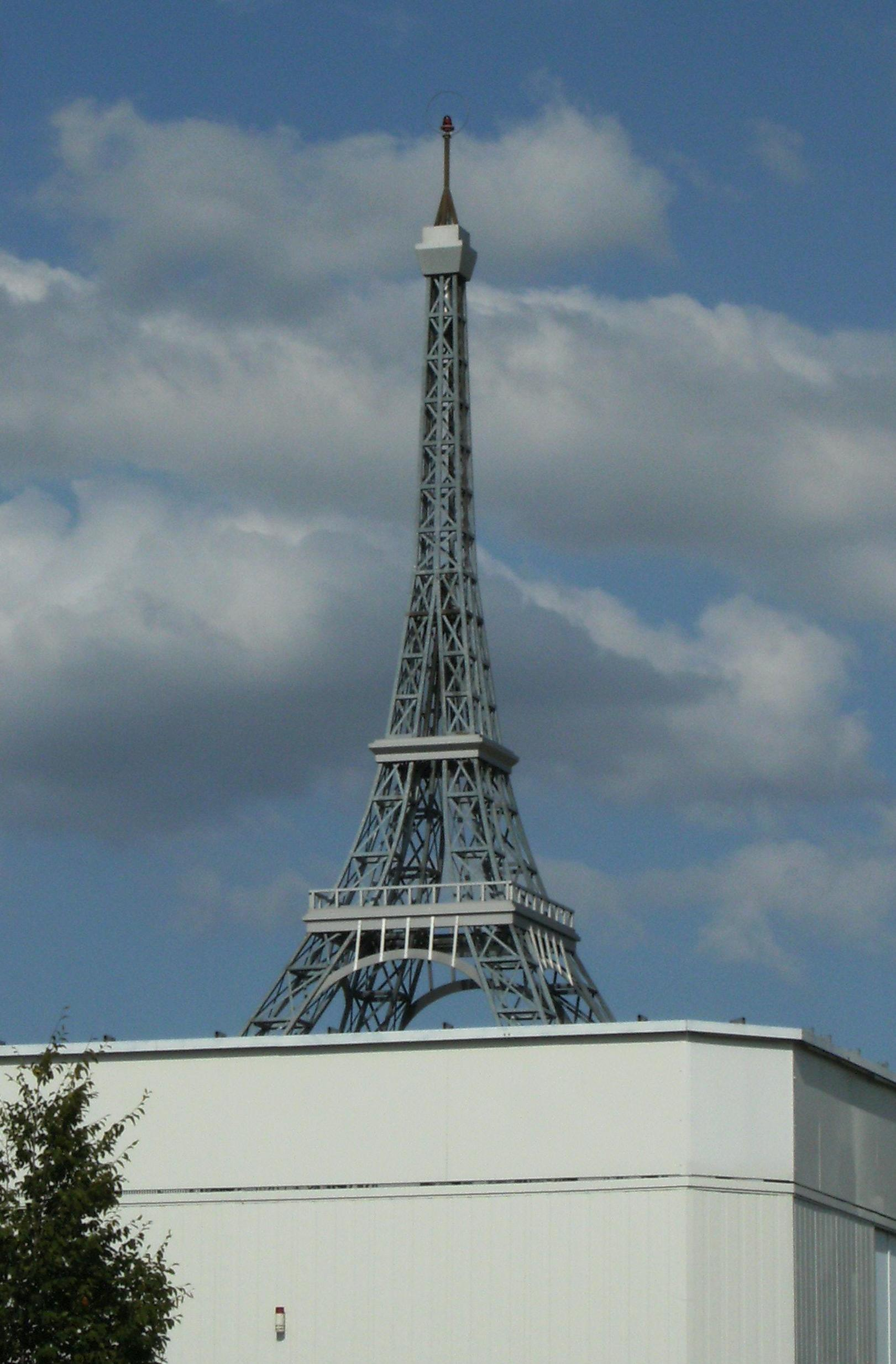
Replica of Eiffel Tower on factory building at Satteldorf near Crailsheim, Germany
