= Eisbach =

Eisbach may refer to:

== Places ==
- Eisbach (Styria), a municipality in the district of Graz-Umgebung, Styria, Austria
- Eisbach (Gaildorf), village in the borough of Gaildorf, county of Schwäbisch Hall, Baden-Württemberg, Germany
- Eisbach (Königswinter), district of Königswinter, Rhein-Sieg-Kreis, North Rhine-Westphalia, Germany
- Eisbach (Sulzbach-Laufen), village in Sulzbach-Laufen, county of Schwäbisch Hall, Baden-Württemberg, Germany
- Eisbach (Micheldorf), village in Micheldorf in Oberösterreich, district of Kirchdorf an der Krems, Upper Austria

Rivers:

- Eisbach (Isar), side arm of the Isar, Bavaria, Germany
- Eisbach (Kocher), right tributary of the Kocher in Sulzbach-Laufen, county of Schwäbisch Hall, Baden-Württemberg, Germany
- Eisbach (Nahe), tributary of the Nahe, Rhineland-Palatinate, Germany
- Eisbach (Paar), tributary of the Paar, Bavaria, Germany
- Eisbach (Queich), tributary of the Queich, Rhineland-Palatinate, Germany
- Eisbach (Rhine), tributary of the Rhine, Rhineland-Palatinate, Germany
- Eisbach, a right tributary of the Stiersbach near Oberrot in the county of Schwäbisch Hall, Baden-Württemberg, Germany
- Eisbach (Wallersee), stream feeding the Wallersee near Köstendorf, Salzburger Seengebiet, Austria
- Eisbach (Wulka), tributary of the Wulka, Burgenland, Austria
