= Fichtenberg =

Fichtenberg may refer to the following places in Germany:

- Fichtenberg (Württemberg), in the Schwäbisch Hall district
- A part of Mühlberg (Elbe) in the Elbe-Elster district
- Fichtenberg (Berlin), a part of the Steglitz district in Berlin
