= Ernsbach =

Ernsbach may refer to:

- Ernsbach (Kocher), a river of Baden-Württemberg, Germany, tributary of the Kocher
- Ernsbach (Riedbach), a river of Baden-Württemberg, Germany, tributary of the Riedbach
