= Hirtenbach =

Hirtenbach may refer to:

- Hirtenbach (Bühler), a river of Baden-Württemberg, Germany
- Hirtenbach (Wetter), a river of Hesse, Germany
