= Lanzenbach (Bühler) =

River in Germany

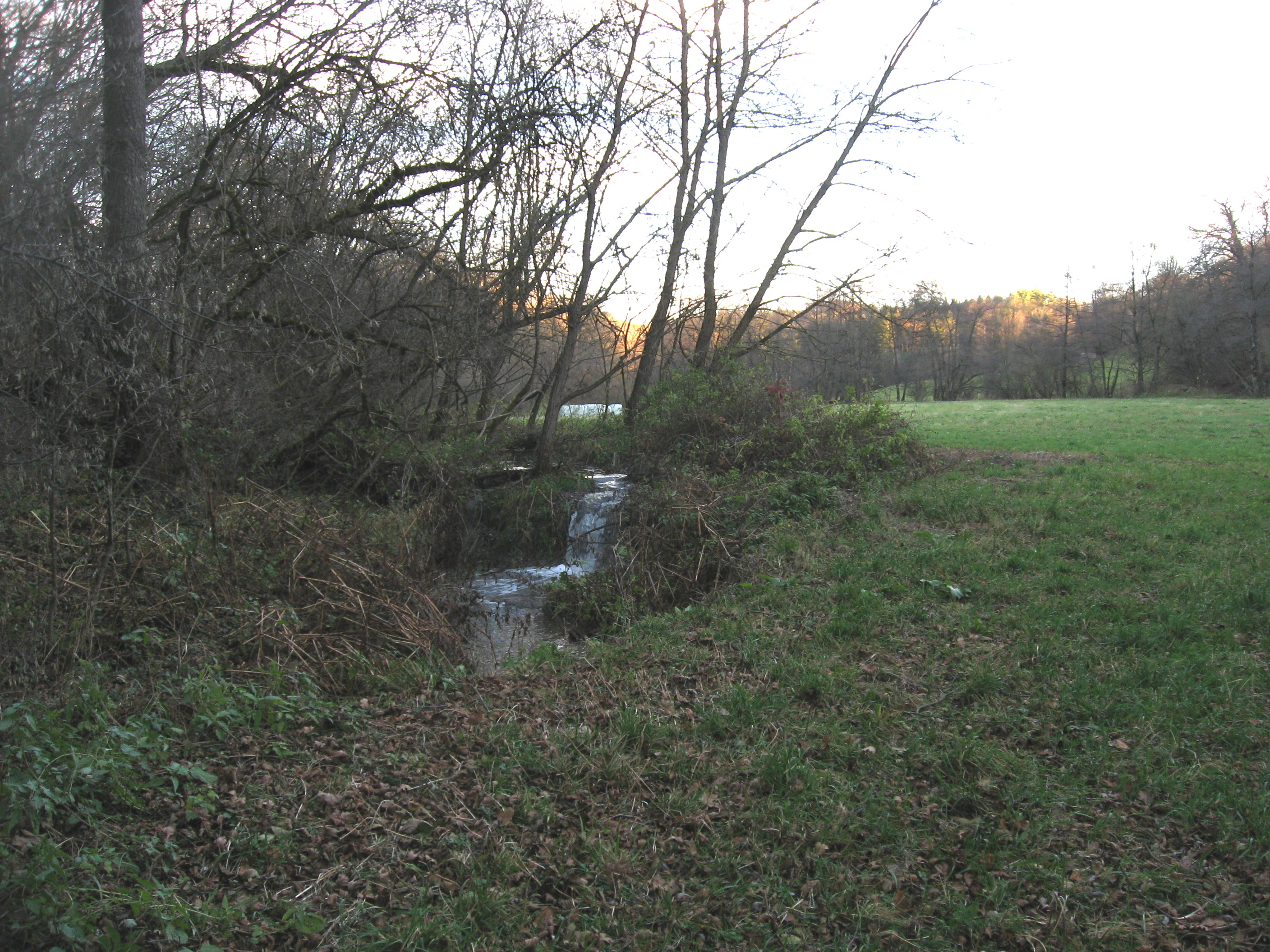

Location
- Country: Germany
- State: Baden-Württemberg

Physical characteristics
- Mouth
  - location: Bühler
  - coordinates: 49.0776°N 9.8929°E

Basin features
- Progression: Bühler→ Kocher→ Neckar→ Rhine→ North Sea

The Lanzenbach is a small river of Baden-Württemberg, Germany. It is a right tributary of the Bühler at Eschenau, a district of Vellberg.

== See also ==
- List of rivers of Baden-Württemberg
