= Aalenbach =

River in Germany

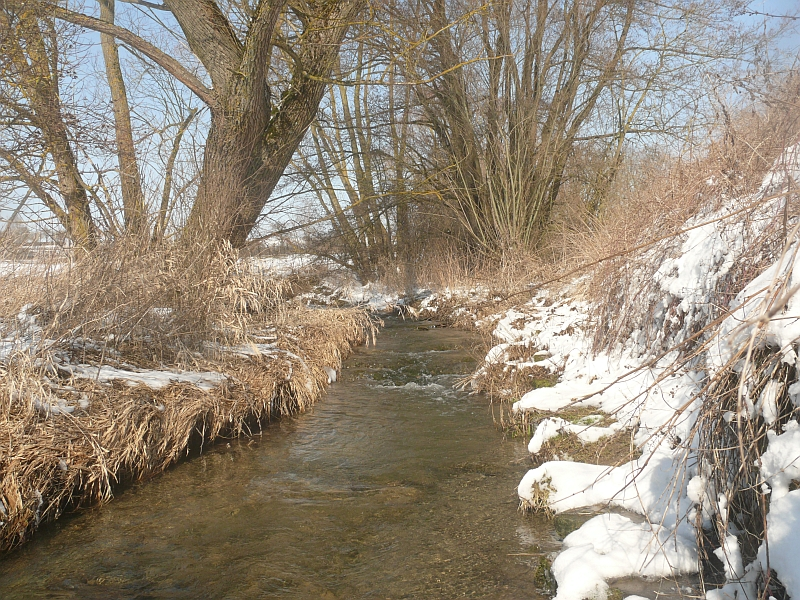
- The Aalenbach at Kleinaltdorf (a part of Vellberg)

- Mouth

Location
- Country: Germany
- State: Baden-Württemberg

Physical characteristics
- Mouth
  - location: Bühler
  - coordinates: 49°5′27″N 9°52′42″E

Basin features
- Progression: Bühler→ Kocher→ Neckar→ Rhine→ North Sea

The Aalenbach is a river located in Baden-Württemberg, Germany. It is 9.6 km (6.0 mi) long and is a tributary of the Bühler which it flows into near Vellberg.

== See also ==
- List of rivers of Baden-Württemberg
