= Otterbach (Bühler) =

River in Baden-Württemberg, Germany

Location
- Country: Germany
- States: Baden-Württemberg

Physical characteristics
- Mouth
  - location: Bühler
  - coordinates: 49.1231°N 9.8578°E

Basin features
- Progression: Bühler→ Kocher→ Neckar→ Rhine→ North Sea

The Otterbach (German pronunciation: [ˈɔtɐbax]) is a river of Baden-Württemberg, Germany. It is a tributary of the Bühler near Vellberg.

== See also ==
- List of rivers of Baden-Württemberg
