= Sauerbach =

Sauerbach may refer to:

- Sauerbach (Aal), a river of Baden-Württemberg, Germany, headwater of the Aal
- Sauerbach (Avenbach), a river of Baden-Württemberg, Germany, headwater of the Avenbach
- Sauerbach (Schweinnaab), a river of Bavaria, Germany
