= Nesselbach =

Nesselbach may refer to:

- Nesselbach (Bühler), a river of Baden-Württemberg, Germany, right tributary of the Bühler
- Nesselbach (Rombach), a river of Baden-Württemberg, Germany, upper part of the Rombach (tributary of the Aal)
- Nesselbach (Lenne), a river of North Rhine-Westphalia, Germany, right tributary of the Lenne
- a village in the district of Schwäbisch Hall, in Baden-Württemberg, Germany, today part of Langenburg
- a river in Döbling, district of Vienna, Austria
