= Wallhausen =

Wallhausen may refer to the following places in Germany:

- Wallhausen, Baden-Württemberg, in the district of Schwäbisch Hall
- Wallhausen, Rhineland-Palatinate, in the district of Bad Kreuznach
- Wallhausen, Saxony-Anhalt, in the district of Mansfeld-Südharz
- Konstanz-Wallhausen, a ward of the city of Konstanz, Baden-Württemberg.
