= Schmerach =

River in Germany

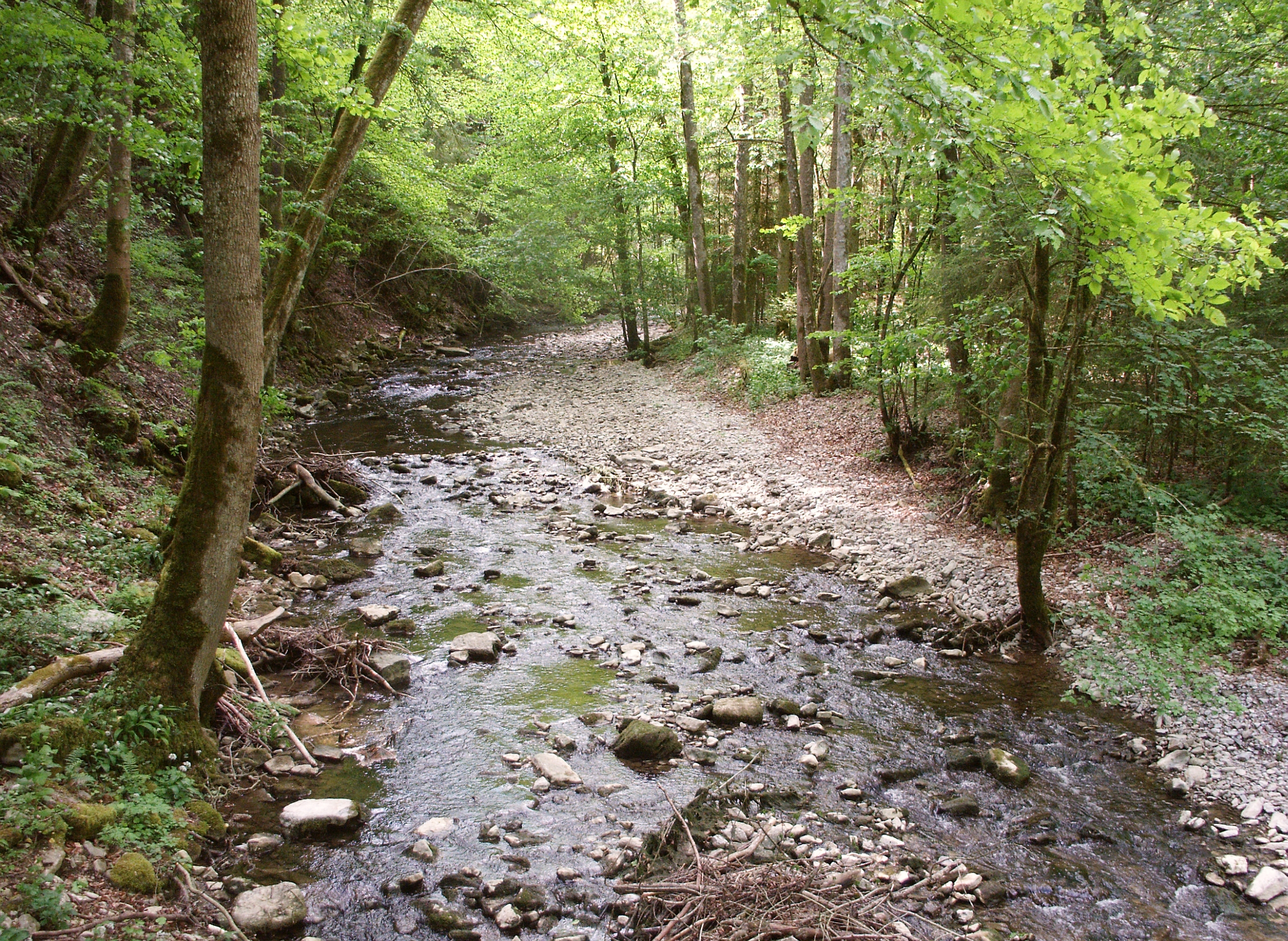

Location
- Country: Germany
- State: Baden-Württemberg

Physical characteristics
- Mouth
  - location: Bühler
  - coordinates: 49.1297°N 9.8612°E
- Length: 14.0 km (8.7 mi)

Basin features
- Progression: Bühler→ Kocher→ Neckar→ Rhine→ North Sea

The Schmerach is a river of Baden-Württemberg, Germany. It flows into the Bühler in Oberscheffach.

== See also ==
- List of rivers of Baden-Württemberg
