= Schwarzenlachenbach =

River in Germany

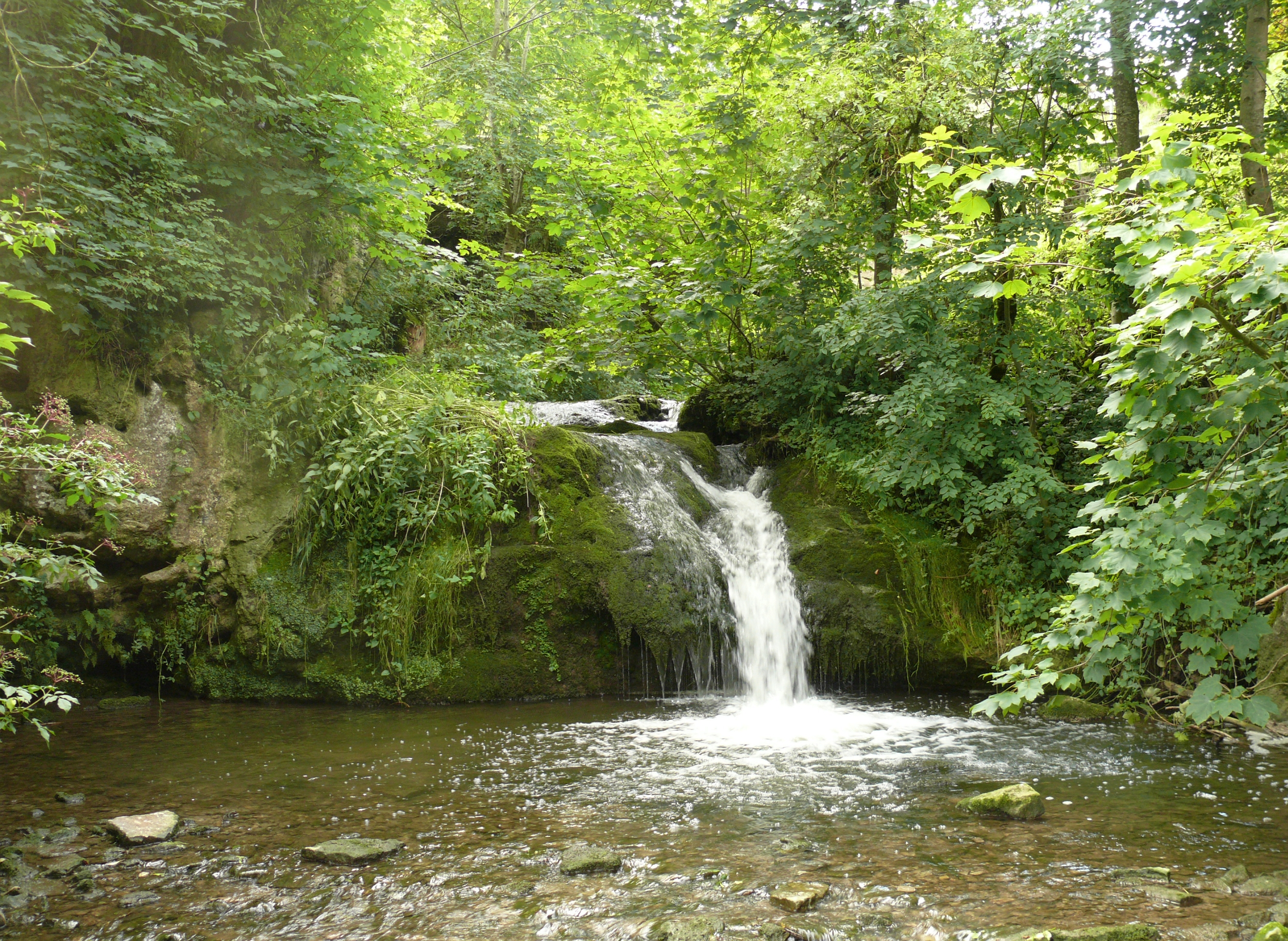

Location
- Country: Germany
- States: Baden-Württemberg

Physical characteristics
- Mouth
  - location: Bühler
  - coordinates: 49.1039°N 9.8659°E

Basin features
- Progression: Bühler→ Kocher→ Neckar→ Rhine→ North Sea

Schwarzenlachenbach is a small river of Baden-Württemberg, Germany. A tributary of the Bühler, the Schwarzenlachenbach joins it near Vellberg.

== See also ==
- List of rivers of Baden-Württemberg
