= Steinbach (Bühler, Vellberg) =

River in Baden-Württemberg, Germany

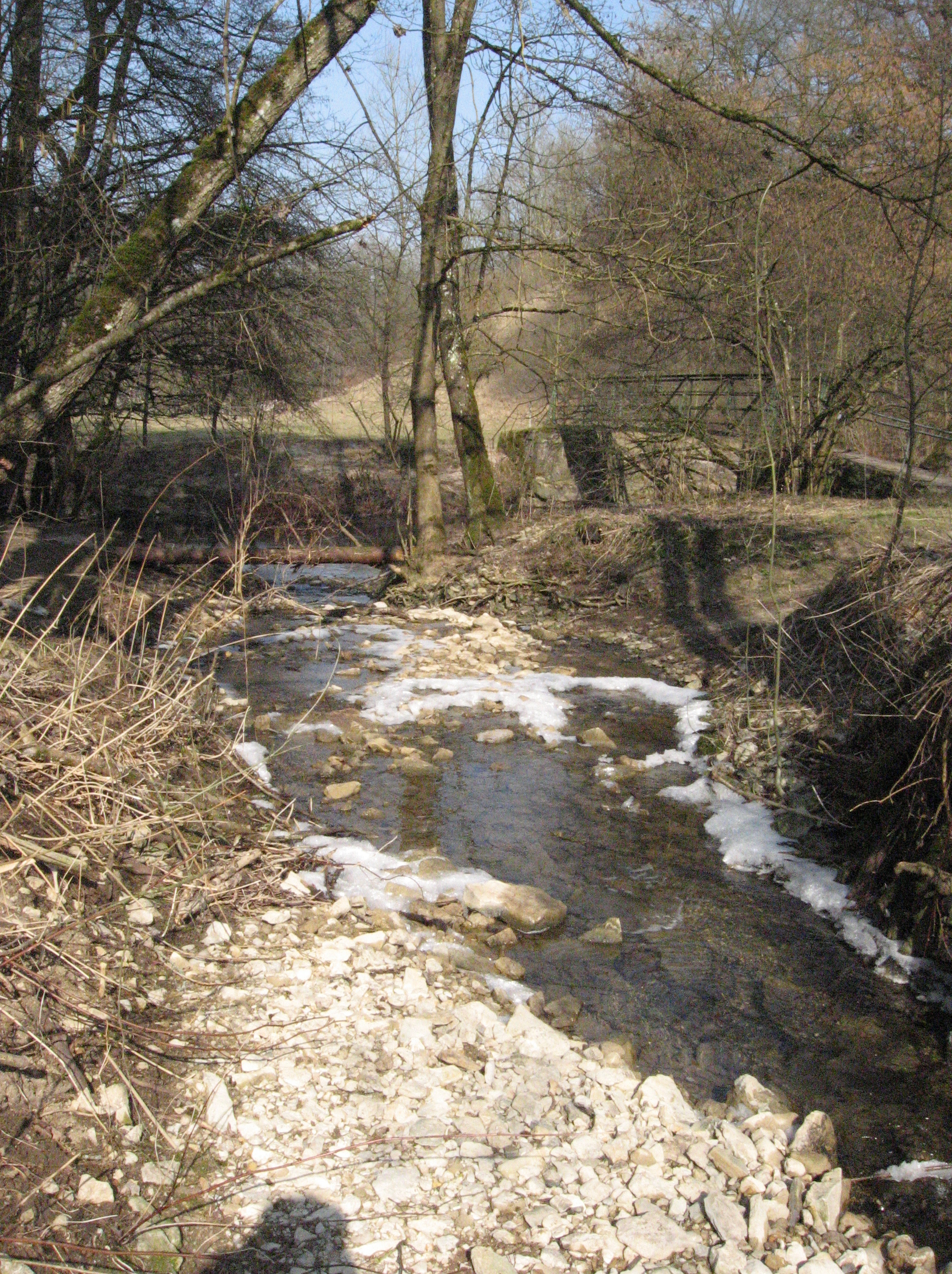

Location
- Country: Germany
- State: Baden-Württemberg

Physical characteristics
- Mouth
  - location: Bühler
  - coordinates: 49.0788°N 9.8884°E

Basin features
- Progression: Bühler→ Kocher→ Neckar→ Rhine→ North Sea

The Steinbach is a 4.7 km long river in northeastern Baden-Württemberg, Germany. It is a left tributary of the Bühler river south of Vellberg.

== See also ==
- List of rivers of Baden-Württemberg
