= Fischach (disambiguation) =

Fischach is a municipality in the district of Augsburg in Bavaria, Germany.

Fischach may also refer to:

- Fischach (Bühler), a river of Baden-Württemberg, Germany, tributary of the Bühler
- Fischach (Salzach), a river of the state Salzburg, Austria, tributary of the Salzach
