= Gruppenbach =

Gruppenbach may refer to:

- Gruppenbach (Schozach), a river of Baden-Württemberg, Germany, tributary of the Schozach
- Gruppenbach (Bühler), a river of Baden-Württemberg, Germany, tributary of the Bühler
