= Dammbach (Bühler) =

River in Germany

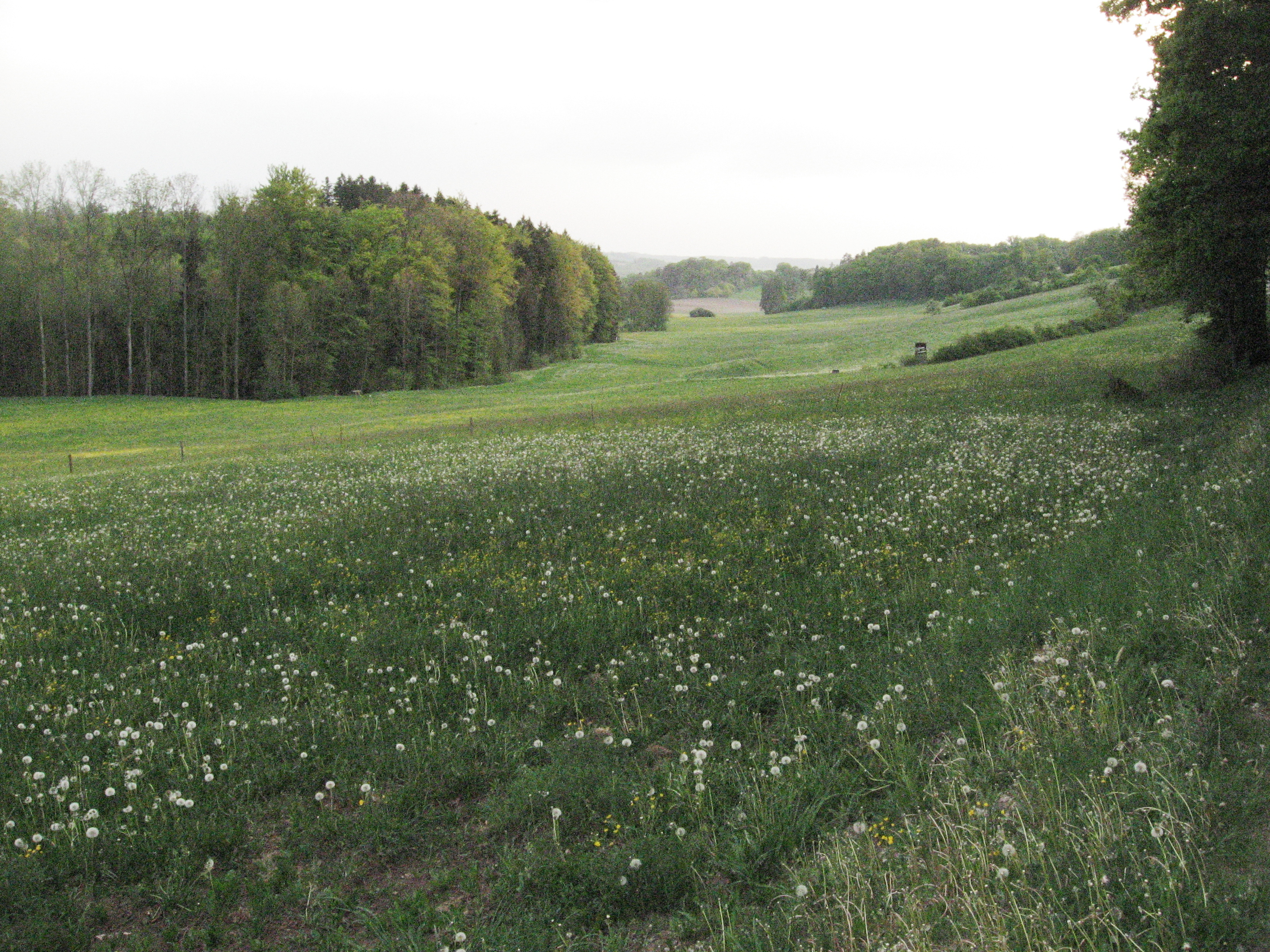
- The valley of the Dammbach

Location
- Country: Germany
- State: Baden-Württemberg

Physical characteristics
- Mouth
  - location: Bühler
  - coordinates: 49.0358°N 9.9122°E

Basin features
- Progression: Bühler→ Kocher→ Neckar→ Rhine→ North Sea

The Dammbach (German pronunciation: [ˈdambax]) is a river of Baden-Württemberg, Germany. It flows into the Bühler in Bühlertann.

== See also ==
- List of rivers of Baden-Württemberg
