= Gruppenbach (Bühler) =

River in Germany

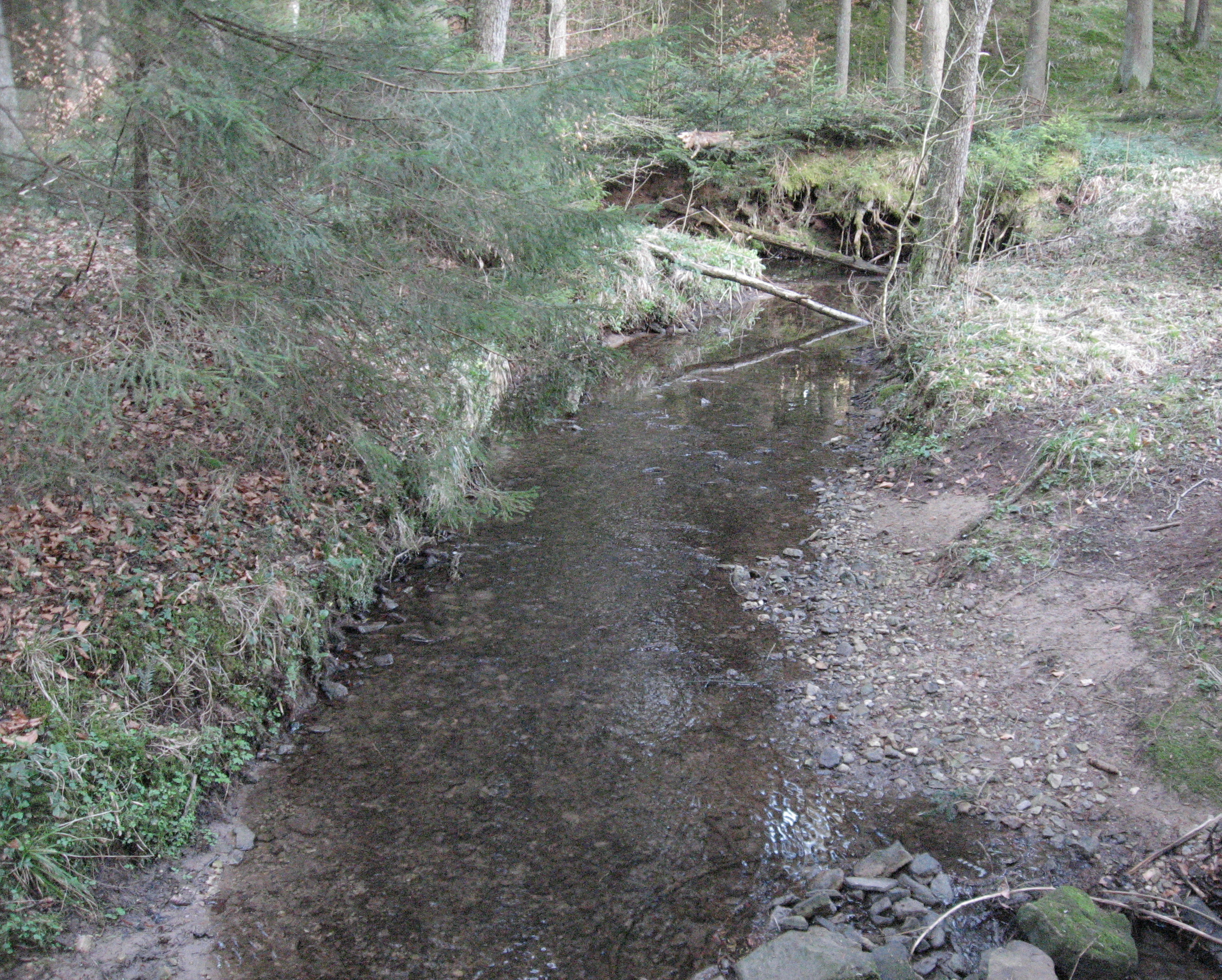

Location
- Country: Germany
- States: Baden-Württemberg

Physical characteristics
- Source
  - coordinates: 49°00′36″N 09°57′23″E
- Mouth
  - location: Bühler
  - coordinates: 48.9808°N 9.9263°E

Basin features
- Progression: Bühler→ Kocher→ Neckar→ Rhine→ North Sea

The Gruppenbach is a river of Baden-Württemberg, Germany. It flows into the Bühler near Bühlerzell.

== See also ==
- List of rivers of Baden-Württemberg
