= Hirtenbach (Bühler) =

River in Germany

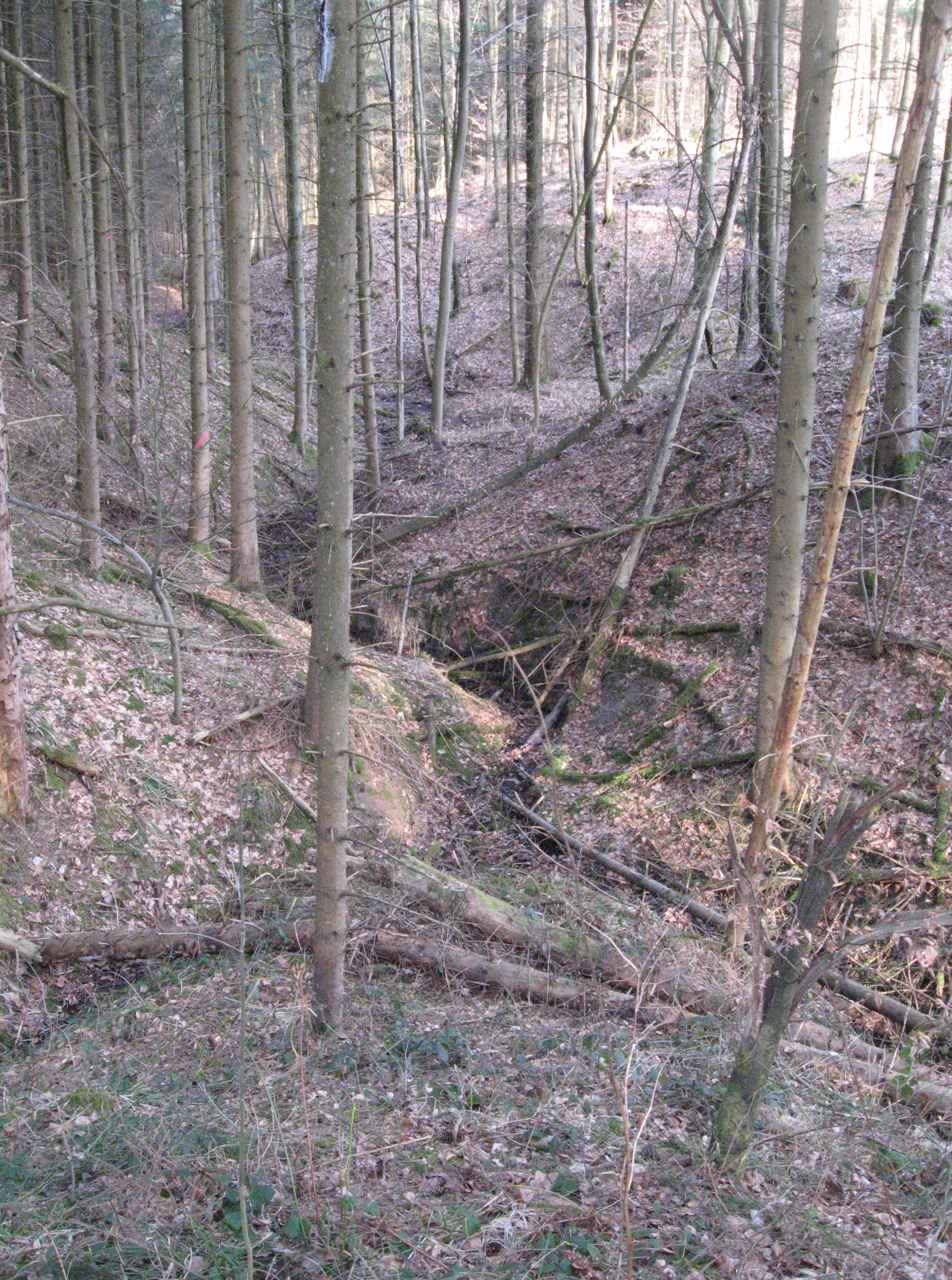

Location
- Country: Germany
- States: Baden-Württemberg

Physical characteristics
- Mouth
  - location: Bühler
  - coordinates: 49.1020°N 9.8675°E

Basin features
- Progression: Bühler→ Kocher→ Neckar→ Rhine→ North Sea

The Hirtenbach is a small river of Baden-Württemberg, Germany. It flows into the Bühler near Vellberg. It is a tributary of the Bühler River, joining it near Sulzdorf-Anhausen at the edge of the Schwäbisch Hall district. The stream is approximately 3.9 to 4 kilometers in length and flows mainly through wooded and rural landscapes before reaching its confluence with the Bühler.

== Location and course ==
- Region: Schwäbisch-Fränkische Waldberge (Swabian-Franconian Forest Hills), Baden-Württemberg, Germany
- Source: Southeast of Hehlberg and northeast of Birkentöbele hill, near the K 2627 road, in a forested area
- Mouth: Flows east and then north to empty into the Bühler River about 300 meters southeast of Sulzdorf-Anhausen
- Length: Approximately 3.9–4 kilometers
- Notable Feature: In its lower course, the stream drops about 30 meters through a wooded ravine

== Hydrology ==
The Hirtenbach flows through a catchment area of approximately 2 square kilometers. From its source to its confluence with the Bühler River, the stream descends about 117 meters in elevation. The basin progression follows the course from Hirtenbach to Bühler, then continues through the Kocher and Neckar rivers, eventually reaching the Rhine and ultimately the North Sea.

== See also ==
- List of rivers of Baden-Württemberg
