= Lea Geldner =

German politician (born 1991)

Member of the Landtag of Baden-Württemberg
- Incumbent
- Assumed office 18 May 2026

Personal details
- Born: 1991 (age 34–35)
- Party: Alliance 90/The Greens

Lea Geldner (born 1991) is a German politician serving as a member of the Landtag of Baden-Württemberg since 2026. She has served as co-chair of Alliance 90/The Greens in Schwäbisch Hall since 2025.
