= Nesselbach (Bühler) =

River in Germany

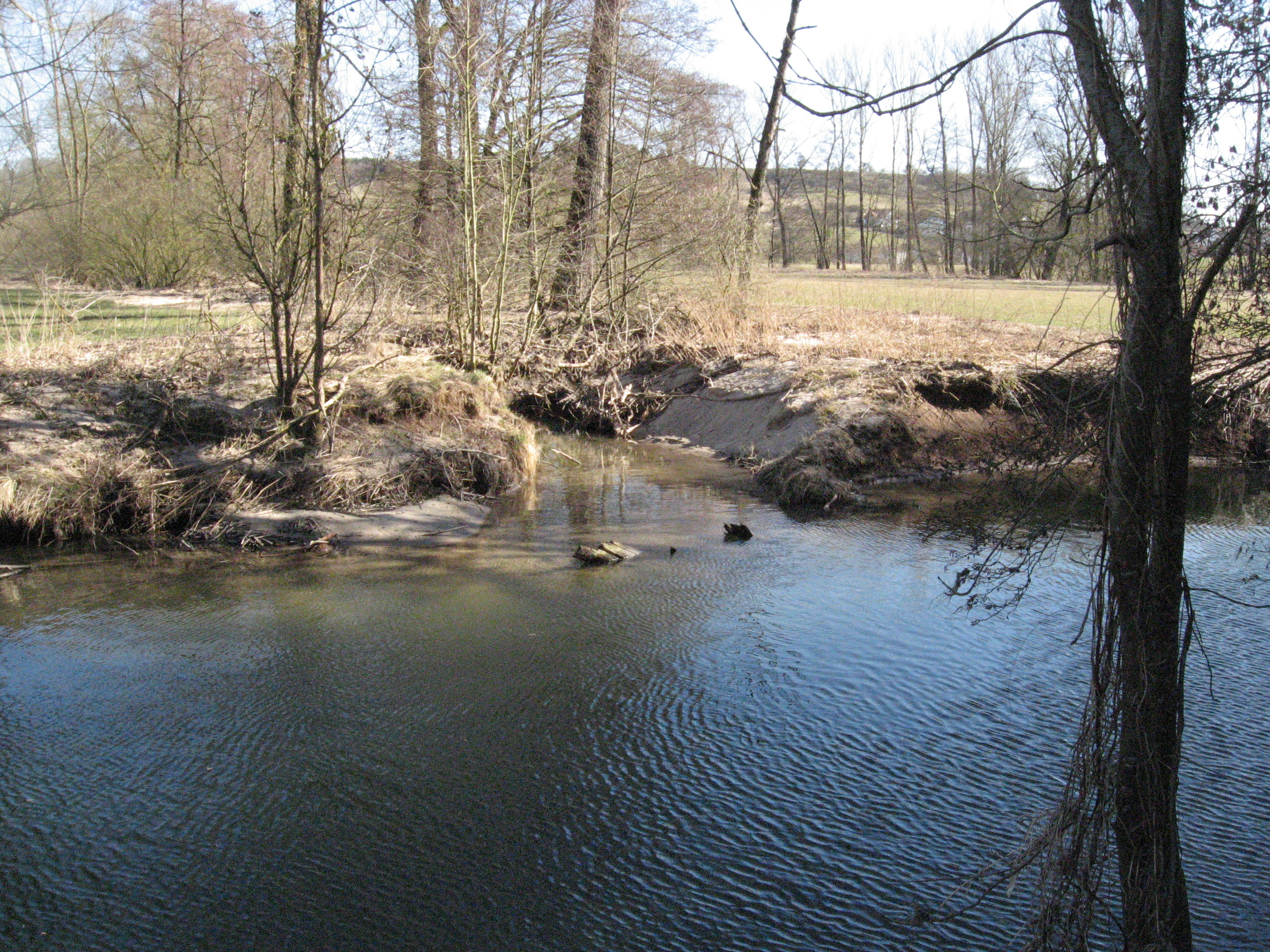

Location
- Country: Germany
- States: Baden-Württemberg

Physical characteristics
- Mouth
  - location: Bühler
  - coordinates: 49.0503°N 9.9052°E

Basin features
- Progression: Bühler→ Kocher→ Neckar→ Rhine→ North Sea

The Nesselbach is a river of Baden-Württemberg, Germany. It is a right tributary of the Bühler, joining it near Obersontheim.

== See also ==
- List of rivers of Baden-Württemberg
