= Fischach (Bühler) =

River in Germany

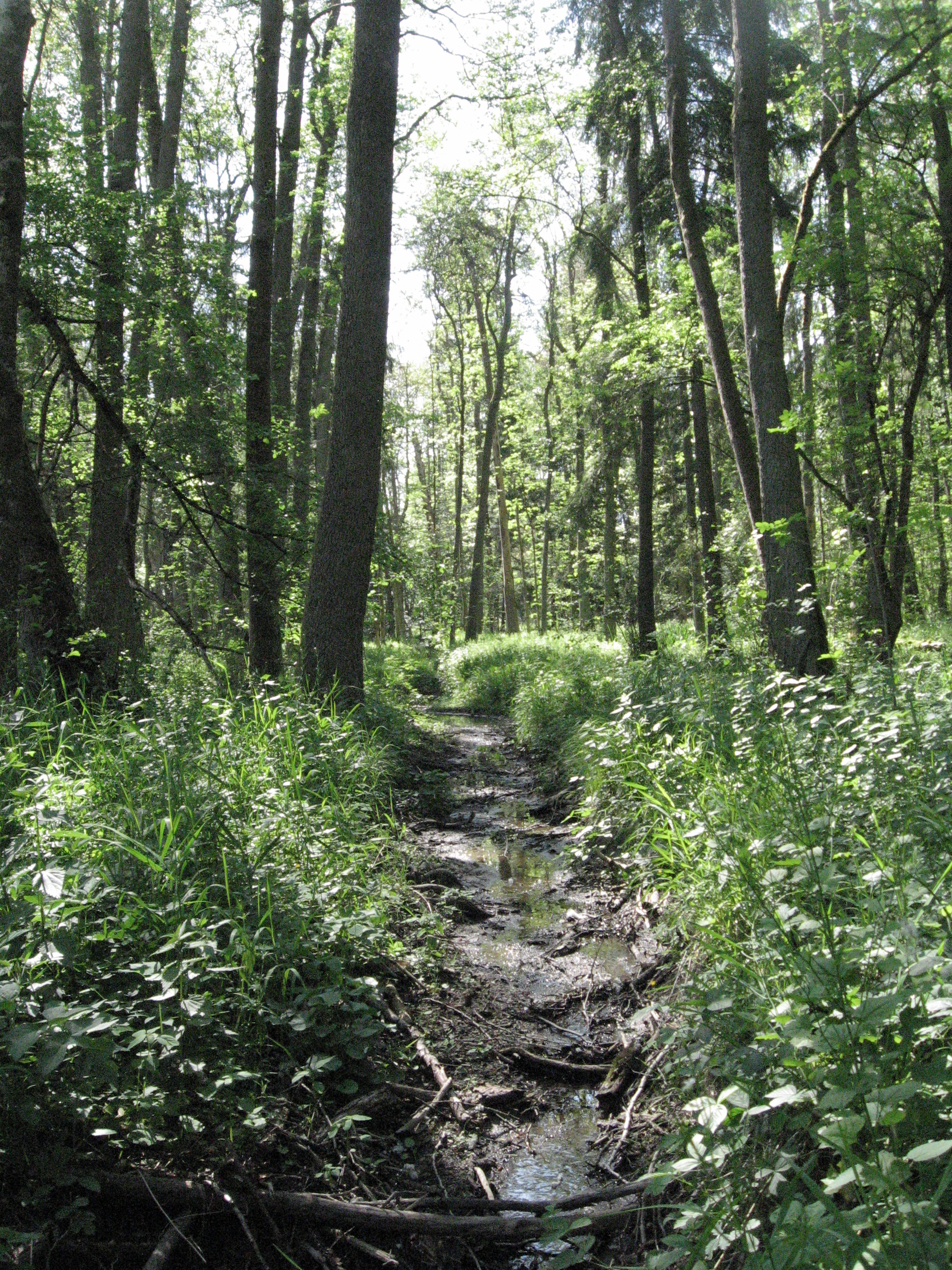

Location
- Country: Germany
- State: Baden-Württemberg

Physical characteristics
- Source
  - elevation: 481 m (1,578 ft)
- Mouth
  - location: Bühler
  - coordinates: 49.0216°N 9.9°E
  - elevation: 376 m (1,234 ft)
- Length: 14.2 km (8.8 mi)

Basin features
- Progression: Bühler→ Kocher→ Neckar→ Rhine→ North Sea

Fischach (German pronunciation: [ˈfɪʃax]) is a river of Baden-Württemberg, Germany. It is a tributary of the Bühler into which it flows near Bühlerzell.

== See also ==
- List of rivers of Baden-Württemberg
