= Avenbach =

River in Germany

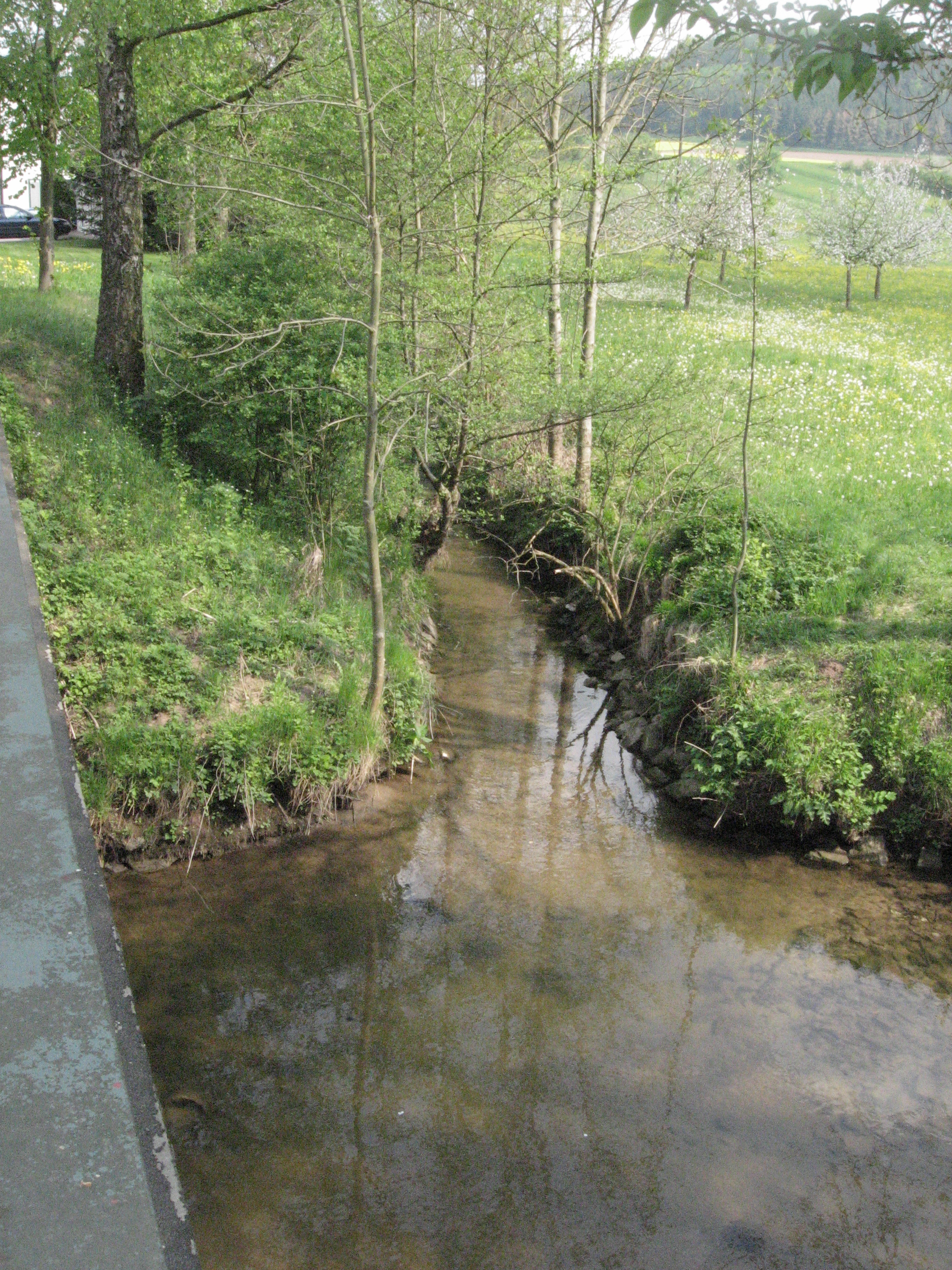
- Mouth of the Avenbach into the Bühler

- Location of mouth

Location
- Country: Germany
- State: Baden-Württemberg

Physical characteristics
- Mouth
  - location: Bühler
  - coordinates: 49.0186°N 9.9129°E

Basin features
- Progression: Bühler→ Kocher→ Neckar→ Rhine→ North Sea
- Tributaries
  - left: Sauerbach

The Avenbach is a river in Baden-Württemberg, Germany. The Avenbach is a tributary of the Bühler and flows into the latter near Bühlertann.

== See also ==
- List of rivers of Baden-Württemberg
