= Mainhardt =

- Municipality
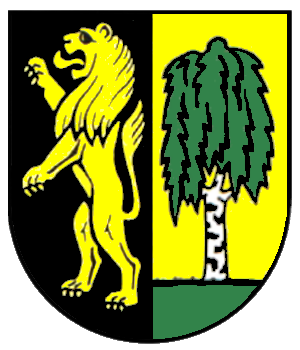
- Coat of arms

- Location of Mainhardt within Schwäbisch Hall district
- Interactive map of Mainhardt
- Location within Germany Location within Baden-Württemberg
- Coordinates: 49°5′N 9°33′E
- Country: Germany
- State: Baden-Württemberg
- Admin. region: Stuttgart
- District: Schwäbisch Hall
- Subdivisions: 5 Ortsteile

Government
  - Mayor (2018–26): Damian Komor

Area
  - Total: 58.69 km^{2} (22.66 sq mi)
- Elevation: 471 m (1,545 ft)

Population (2025-12-31)
  - Total: 5,963
  - Density: 101.6/km^{2} (263.1/sq mi)
- Time zone: UTC+01:00 (CET)
  - Summer (DST): UTC+02:00 (CEST)
- Postal codes: 74535
- Dialling codes: 07903
- Vehicle registration: SHA
- Website: www.mainhardt.de

Mainhardt (German pronunciation: [ˈmaɪ̯nˌhaʁt]) is a municipality in the district of Schwäbisch Hall in Baden-Württemberg in Germany.

== Demographics ==
Population development:

| Year | Inhabitants |
|---|---|
| 1939 | 2.853 |
| 1961 | 3.532 |
| 1970 | 3.818 |
| 1980 | 4.210 |
| 1990 | 4.636 |
| 2000 | 5.397 |
| 2010 | 5.715 |
| 2017 | 5.904 |

== See also ==
- Mainhardt Forest
