= Michelfeld =

- Municipality
- Coat of arms

- Location of Michelfeld within Schwäbisch Hall district
- Interactive map of Michelfeld
- Location within Germany Location within Baden-Württemberg
- Coordinates: 49°06′02″N 09°40′54″E
- Country: Germany
- State: Baden-Württemberg
- Admin. region: Stuttgart
- District: Schwäbisch Hall

Government
  - Mayor (2017–25): Wolfgang Binning

Area
  - Total: 35.22 km^{2} (13.60 sq mi)
- Elevation: 361 m (1,184 ft)

Population (2025-12-31)
  - Total: 3,683
  - Density: 104.6/km^{2} (270.8/sq mi)
- Time zone: UTC+01:00 (CET)
  - Summer (DST): UTC+02:00 (CEST)
- Postal codes: 74545
- Dialling codes: 0791
- Vehicle registration: SHA
- Website: www.michelfeld.de

Michelfeld is a town in the district of Schwäbisch Hall in Baden-Württemberg in Germany.

== Demographics ==
Population development:

Year	Inhabitants
1990	2,910
2001	3,575
2011	3,685
2021	3,837
