= Bühler (river) =

River in Germany

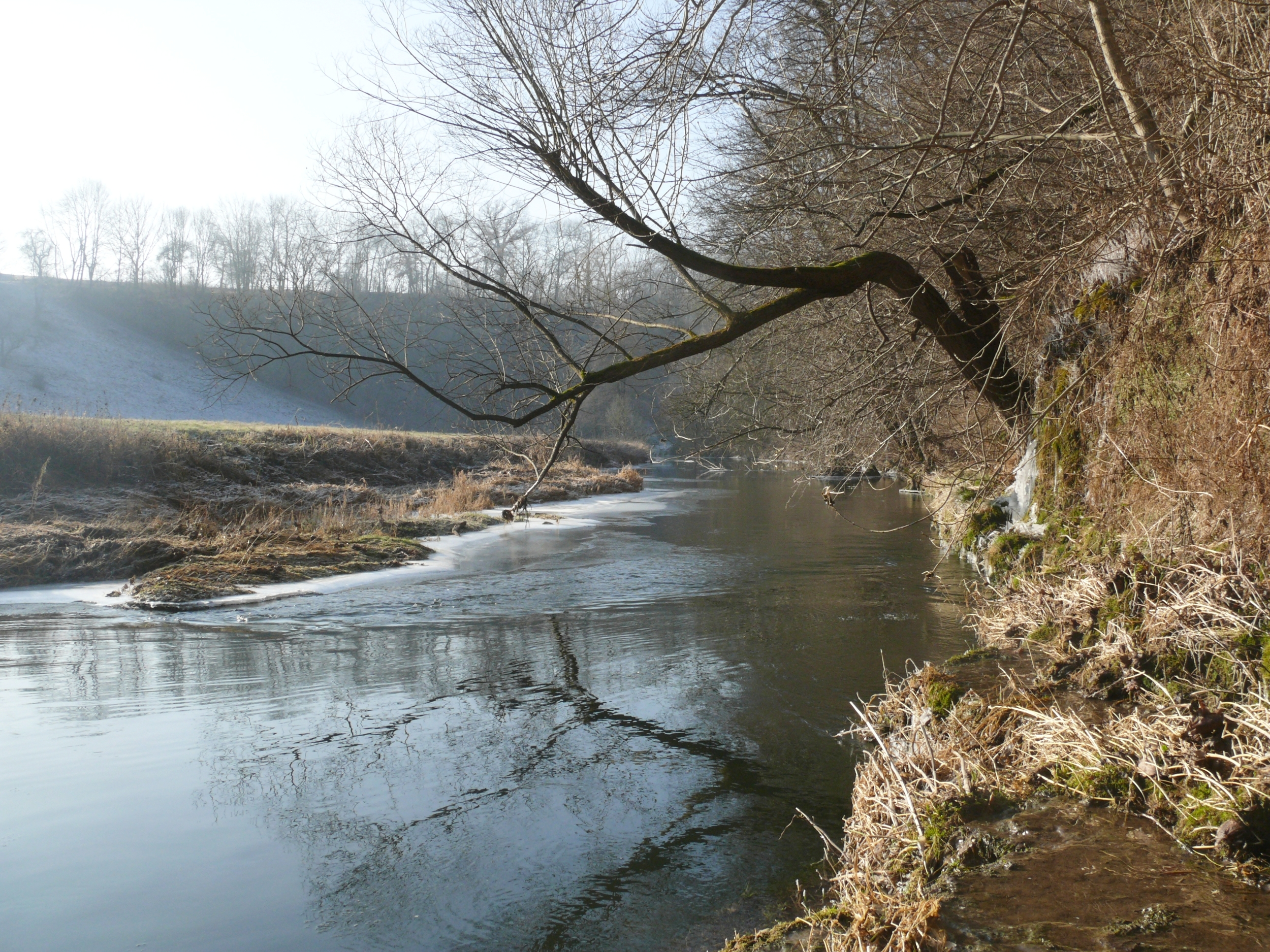
- The Bühler near Vellberg-Rappolden

Location
- Country: Germany
- State: Baden-Württemberg

Physical characteristics
- Mouth
  - location: Kocher
  - coordinates: 49.1685°N 9.7861°E
- Length: 48.6 km (30.2 mi)
- Basin size: 277 km^{2} (107 sq mi)

Basin features
- Progression: Kocher→ Neckar→ Rhine→ North Sea
- Tributaries
  - left: Fischach
  - right: Schmerach

The Bühler (German pronunciation: [ˈbyːlɐ]) is a river in Baden-Württemberg, Germany. It flows into the Kocher near Braunsbach. It is 48.6 km (30.2 mi) long and its basin size is 277 km^{2} (107 sq mi).

== Tributaries ==
The following rivers are tributaries to the Bühler (from source to mouth):

- Left: Klingenbach, Schleifseebach, Fischach, Schießbach, Riedbach, Steinbach, Hirtenbach, Schwarzenlachenbach, Otterbach
- Right: Gruppenbach, Avenbach, Elsäßerbach, Dammbach, Nesselbach, Lanzenbach, Aalenbach, Schmerach

== See also ==
- List of rivers of Baden-Württemberg
