= Rosengarten, Baden-Württemberg =

Rosengarten
- Municipality
- Coat of arms

- Location of Rosengarten within Schwäbisch Hall district
- Interactive map of Rosengarten
- Location within Germany Location within Baden-Württemberg
- Coordinates: 49°04′04″N 09°43′36″E
- Country: Germany
- State: Baden-Württemberg
- Admin. region: Stuttgart
- District: Schwäbisch Hall

Government
  - Mayor (2019–27): Julian Tausch

Area
  - Total: 31.02 km^{2} (11.98 sq mi)
- Elevation: 370 m (1,210 ft)

Population (2025-12-31)
  - Total: 5,301
  - Density: 170.9/km^{2} (442.6/sq mi)
- Time zone: UTC+01:00 (CET)
  - Summer (DST): UTC+02:00 (CEST)
- Postal codes: 74538
- Dialling codes: 0791
- Vehicle registration: SHA
- Website: www.rosengarten.de

Rosengarten is a municipality in the district of Schwäbisch Hall in Baden-Württemberg in Germany.
