= Michelbach an der Bilz =

- Municipality
- Coat of arms

- Location of Michelbach an der Bilz within Schwäbisch Hall district
- Interactive map of Michelbach an der Bilz
- Location within Germany Location within Baden-Württemberg
- Coordinates: 49°04′18″N 09°46′00″E
- Country: Germany
- State: Baden-Württemberg
- Admin. region: Stuttgart
- District: Schwäbisch Hall

Government
  - Mayor (2024–32): André Dörr

Area
  - Total: 17.69 km^{2} (6.83 sq mi)
- Elevation: 388 m (1,273 ft)

Population (2025-12-31)
  - Total: 3,398
  - Density: 192.1/km^{2} (497.5/sq mi)
- Time zone: UTC+01:00 (CET)
  - Summer (DST): UTC+02:00 (CEST)
- Postal codes: 74544
- Dialling codes: 0791
- Vehicle registration: SHA
- Website: www.michelbach-bilz.de

Michelbach an der Bilz is a town in the district of Schwäbisch Hall in Baden-Württemberg in Germany.

== Demographics ==
Population development:

Year	Inhabitants
1990	3,106
2001	3,342
2011	3,413
2021	3,597
