= Fichtenau =

- Municipality
- Coat of arms

- Location of Fichtenau within Schwäbisch Hall district
- Interactive map of Fichtenau
- Location within Germany Location within Baden-Württemberg
- Coordinates: 49°04′10″N 10°12′47″E
- Country: Germany
- State: Baden-Württemberg
- Admin. region: Stuttgart
- District: Schwäbisch Hall

Government
  - Mayor (2023–31): Anja Schmidt-Wagemann

Area
  - Total: 31.28 km^{2} (12.08 sq mi)
- Elevation: 528 m (1,732 ft)

Population (2025-12-31)
  - Total: 4,591
  - Density: 146.8/km^{2} (380.1/sq mi)
- Time zone: UTC+01:00 (CET)
  - Summer (DST): UTC+02:00 (CEST)
- Postal codes: 74579
- Dialling codes: 07962
- Vehicle registration: SHA
- Website: www.fichtenau.de

Fichtenau is a community of several villages, in the district of Schwäbisch Hall, in Baden-Württemberg, Germany.
