= Stimpfach =

- Municipality
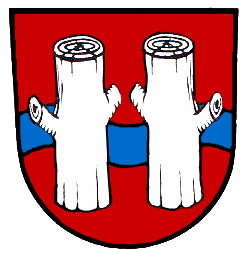
- Coat of arms

- Location of Stimpfach within Schwäbisch Hall district
- Interactive map of Stimpfach
- Location within Germany Location within Baden-Württemberg
- Coordinates: 49°03′44″N 10°05′24″E
- Country: Germany
- State: Baden-Württemberg
- Admin. region: Stuttgart
- District: Schwäbisch Hall

Government
  - Mayor (2023–31): Matthias Strobel (CDU)

Area
  - Total: 33.35 km^{2} (12.88 sq mi)
- Elevation: 450 m (1,480 ft)

Population (2025-12-31)
  - Total: 2,956
  - Density: 88.64/km^{2} (229.6/sq mi)
- Time zone: UTC+01:00 (CET)
  - Summer (DST): UTC+02:00 (CEST)
- Postal codes: 74597
- Dialling codes: 07967
- Vehicle registration: SHA
- Website: www.stimpfach.de

Stimpfach is a municipality in the district of Schwäbisch Hall in Baden-Württemberg in Germany.
