= Wolpertshausen =

- Municipality
- Coat of arms

- Location of Wolpertshausen within Schwäbisch Hall district
- Interactive map of Wolpertshausen
- Location within Germany Location within Baden-Württemberg
- Coordinates: 49°10′01″N 09°50′43″E
- Country: Germany
- State: Baden-Württemberg
- Admin. region: Stuttgart
- District: Schwäbisch Hall

Government
  - Mayor (2022–30): Jürgen Silberzahn

Area
  - Total: 27.42 km^{2} (10.59 sq mi)
- Elevation: 439 m (1,440 ft)

Population (2025-12-31)
  - Total: 2,358
  - Density: 86.00/km^{2} (222.7/sq mi)
- Time zone: UTC+01:00 (CET)
  - Summer (DST): UTC+02:00 (CEST)
- Postal codes: 74549
- Dialling codes: 07904
- Vehicle registration: SHA
- Website: www.wolpertshausen.de

Wolpertshausen (German pronunciation: [vɔlpɐt͡sˈhaʊ̯zn̩]) is a municipality in the district of Schwäbisch Hall in Baden-Württemberg in Germany.
