= Fichtenberg (Württemberg) =

- Municipality
- Coat of arms

- Location of Fichtenberg within Schwäbisch Hall district
- Interactive map of Fichtenberg
- Location within Germany Location within Baden-Württemberg
- Coordinates: 48°59′14″N 09°42′44″E
- Country: Germany
- State: Baden-Württemberg
- Admin. region: Stuttgart
- District: Schwäbisch Hall

Government
  - Mayor (2022–30): Ralf Glenk

Area
  - Total: 24.19 km^{2} (9.34 sq mi)
- Elevation: 345 m (1,132 ft)

Population (2025-12-31)
  - Total: 2,831
  - Density: 117.0/km^{2} (303.1/sq mi)
- Time zone: UTC+01:00 (CET)
  - Summer (DST): UTC+02:00 (CEST)
- Postal codes: 74427
- Dialling codes: 07971
- Vehicle registration: SHA
- Website: www.fichtenberg.de

Fichtenberg is a municipality in the district of Schwäbisch Hall in Baden-Württemberg in Germany.
