= Oberrot =

- Municipality
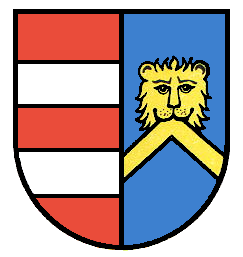
- Coat of arms

- Location of Oberrot within Schwäbisch Hall district
- Interactive map of Oberrot
- Location within Germany Location within Baden-Württemberg
- Coordinates: 49°00′55″N 09°40′15″E
- Country: Germany
- State: Baden-Württemberg
- Admin. region: Stuttgart
- District: Schwäbisch Hall

Government
  - Mayor (2021–29): Peter Keilhofer

Area
  - Total: 37.92 km^{2} (14.64 sq mi)
- Elevation: 369 m (1,211 ft)

Population (2025-12-31)
  - Total: 3,537
  - Density: 93.28/km^{2} (241.6/sq mi)
- Time zone: UTC+01:00 (CET)
  - Summer (DST): UTC+02:00 (CEST)
- Postal codes: 74420
- Dialling codes: 07977
- Vehicle registration: SHA
- Website: www.oberrot.de

Oberrot (Swabian: Ewwerroad) is a municipality in the district of Schwäbisch Hall in Baden-Württemberg in Germany.

== Demographics ==
Population development:

| Year | Inhabitants |
|---|---|
| 1990 | 3,191 |
| 2001 | 3,743 |
| 2011 | 3,631 |
| 2021 | 3,556 |
