= Schwäbisch Hall (district) =

Coordinates: 49.15°N 9.91°E

- District
- Flag Coat of arms
- Country: Germany
- State: Baden-Württemberg
- Adm. region: Stuttgart
- Capital: Schwäbisch Hall

Area
  - Total: 1,484.06 km^{2} (573.00 sq mi)

Population (31 December 2024)
  - Total: 200,902
  - Density: 135.373/km^{2} (350.615/sq mi)
- Time zone: UTC+01:00 (CET)
  - Summer (DST): UTC+02:00 (CEST)
- Vehicle registration: CR, SHA
- Website: landkreis-schwaebisch-hall

Schwäbisch Hall ([ˈʃvɛːbɪʃ ˈhal]) is a Landkreis (district) in the northeast of Baden-Württemberg, Germany. Neighboring districts are (from north clockwise) Main-Tauber, the Bavarian district Ansbach, Ostalbkreis, Rems-Murr, and Hohenlohe.

== History ==
The district dates back to the Oberamt Schwäbisch Hall, which was created in 1803, when the previously free imperial city Schwäbisch Hall became part of Württemberg. After several minor changes, it was converted into a district in 1938. In 1973, it was merged with the district Crailsheim and the area around Gaildorf, which was part of the also dissolved district Backnang.

== Geography ==
The two rivers Jagst and Kocher, tributaries to the Neckar, flow through the district. The landscapes covered by the district are the Hohenlohe plain (Hohenloher Ebene), the Swabian-Franconian Forest (Schwäbisch-Fränkischen Waldberge), which includes part of the Mainhardt Forest, and the Frankenhöhe.

== Partnerships ==
The district maintains partnerships with the district Delitzsch (now part of Nordsachsen) in Saxony and the Polish commune of Zamość.

== Coat of arms ==
The coat of arms shows a coin in the top part. The city of Schwäbisch Hall was one of the most important minting towns, the local coin Heller was well known in all of Germany. Below the coin are two hooks, taken from the coat of arms of the district Crailsheim, as well as from the city of Gaildorf. The black-and-white checkered area at the bottom is taken from the coat of arms of the Hohenzollern dynasty, who ruled the area historically.

== Cities and municipalities ==
Clickable map of towns and municipalities in the district

Cities
1. Crailsheim
2. Gaildorf
3. Gerabronn
4. Ilshofen
5. Kirchberg an der Jagst
6. Langenburg
7. Schrozberg
8. Schwäbisch Hall
9. Vellberg
Administrative districts
1. Braunsbach-Untermünkheim
2. Crailsheim
3. Fichtenau
4. Gerabronn
5. Ilshofen-Vellberg
6. Limpurger Land
7. Oberes Bühlertal
8. Rot am See
9. Schwäbisch Hall
Municipalities
1. Blaufelden
2. Braunsbach
3. Bühlertann
4. Bühlerzell
5. Fichtenau
6. Fichtenberg (Württemberg)
7. Frankenhardt
8. Kreßberg
9. Mainhardt
10. Michelbach an der Bilz
11. Michelfeld

12. Oberrot
13. Obersontheim
14. Rosengarten
15. Rot am See
16. Satteldorf
17. Stimpfach
18. Sulzbach-Laufen
19. Untermünkheim
20. Wallhausen
21. Wolpertshausen
