= Sulzbach-Laufen =

- Municipality
- Coat of arms

- Location of Sulzbach-Laufen within Schwäbisch Hall district
- Interactive map of Sulzbach-Laufen
- Location within Germany Location within Baden-Württemberg
- Coordinates: 48°57′48″N 09°50′43″E
- Country: Germany
- State: Baden-Württemberg
- Admin. region: Stuttgart
- District: Schwäbisch Hall

Government
  - Mayor (2022–30): Markus Bock

Area
  - Total: 43.96 km^{2} (16.97 sq mi)
- Elevation: 420 m (1,380 ft)

Population (2025-12-31)
  - Total: 2,587
  - Density: 58.85/km^{2} (152.4/sq mi)
- Time zone: UTC+01:00 (CET)
  - Summer (DST): UTC+02:00 (CEST)
- Postal codes: 74429
- Dialling codes: 07976
- Vehicle registration: SHA
- Website: www.sulzbach-laufen.de

Sulzbach-Laufen (German pronunciation: [ˈzʊlt͡sˌbax ˈlaʊ̯fn̩]) is a municipality in the district of Schwäbisch Hall in Baden-Württemberg in Germany.
