= Frankenhardt =

- Municipality
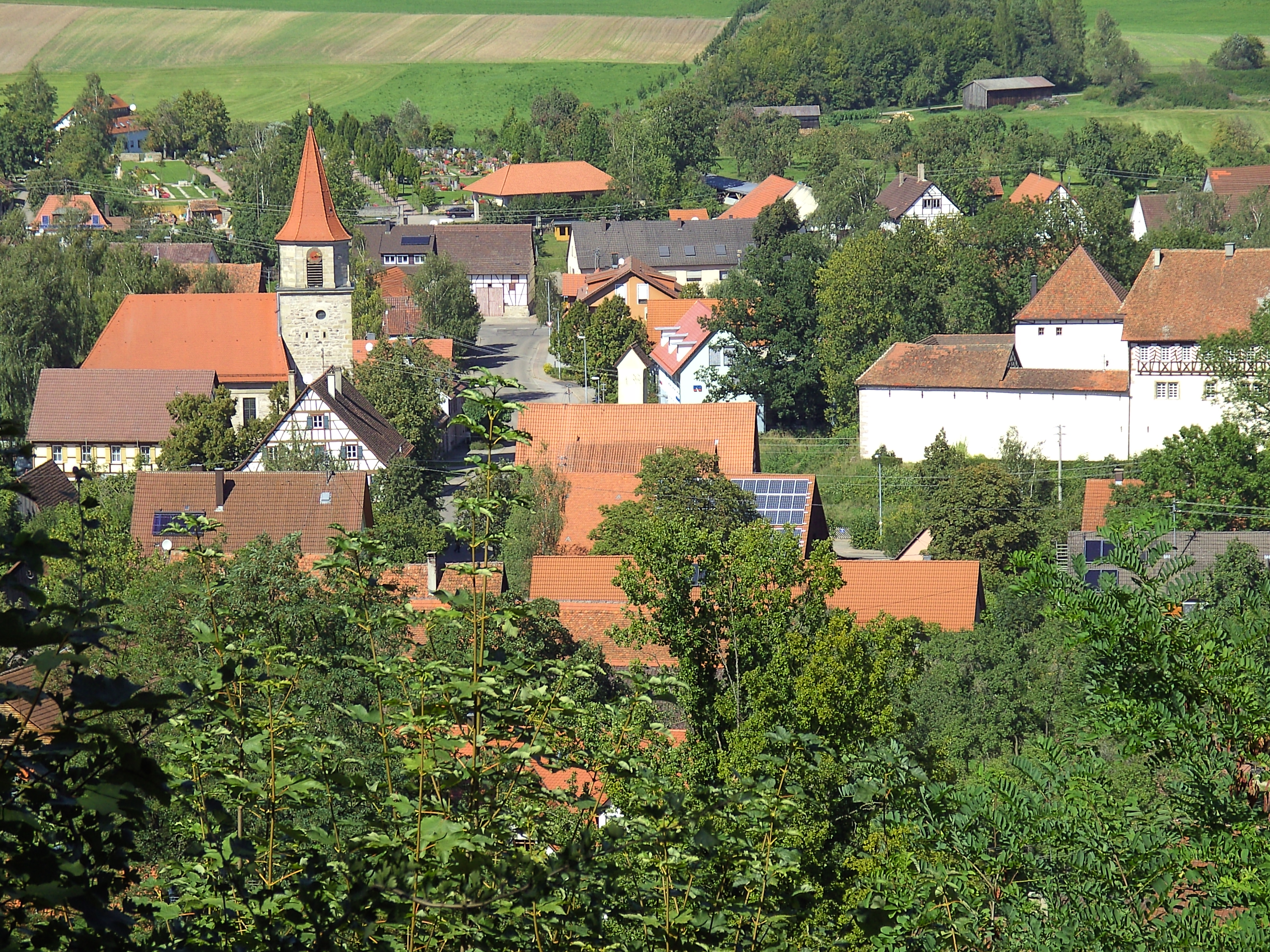
- Honhardt village in Frankenhardt

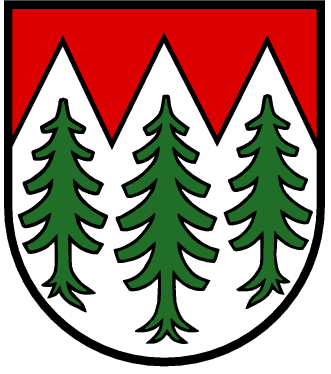
- Coat of arms

- Frankenhardt in Schwäbisch Hall district
- Interactive map of Frankenhardt
- Location within Germany Location within Baden-Württemberg
- Coordinates: 49°04′N 09°59′E
- Country: Germany
- State: Baden-Württemberg
- Admin. region: Stuttgart
- District: Schwäbisch Hall

Government
  - Mayor (2021–29): Jörg Schmidt

Area
  - Total: 69.87 km^{2} (26.98 sq mi)
- Elevation: 455 m (1,493 ft)

Population (2025-12-31)
  - Total: 5,020
  - Density: 71.8/km^{2} (186/sq mi)
- Time zone: UTC+01:00 (CET)
  - Summer (DST): UTC+02:00 (CEST)
- Postal codes: 74586
- Dialling codes: 07959
- Vehicle registration: SHA
- Website: www.frankenhardt.de

Frankenhardt (German pronunciation: [ˈfʁaŋkn̩ˌhaʁt]) is a rural Gemeinde (municipality) in the district of Schwäbisch Hall in Baden-Württemberg in Germany. It consists of thirty-nine villages, hamlets and other settlements. The largest village is Honhardt, followed by Gründelhardt and Oberspeltach. The township lies about twenty kilometres east of the town of Schwäbisch Hall.

The township was created in 1974 by the merger of the townships of Gründelhardt and Honhardt. One year later, the new created township was merged with the municipality of Oberspeltach.
