= Rot am See =

- Municipality
- Coat of arms

- Location of Rot am See within Schwäbisch Hall district
- Interactive map of Rot am See
- Location within Germany Location within Baden-Württemberg
- Coordinates: 49°15′03″N 10°01′24″E
- Country: Germany
- State: Baden-Württemberg
- Admin. region: Stuttgart
- District: Schwäbisch Hall

Government
  - Mayor (2021–29): Sebastian Kampe

Area
  - Total: 74.81 km^{2} (28.88 sq mi)
- Elevation: 419 m (1,375 ft)

Population (2025-12-31)
  - Total: 5,543
  - Density: 74.09/km^{2} (191.9/sq mi)
- Time zone: UTC+01:00 (CET)
  - Summer (DST): UTC+02:00 (CEST)
- Postal codes: 74585
- Dialling codes: 07955
- Vehicle registration: SHA
- Website: www.rotamsee.de

Rot am See ([ʁoːt am zeː]) is a town in the district of Schwäbisch Hall in Baden-Württemberg in Germany with a population of 5,388 as of December 31, 2018.

== History ==
=== Shooting ===
On January 24, 2020, it was the site of a mass shooting which killed six.

== Twin towns ==
Rot am See is twinned with:

- Weyersheim, France, since 2000
- Chatte, France, since 2002
