= Bühlertann =

- Municipality
- Coat of arms

- Location of Bühlertann within Schwäbisch Hall district
- Interactive map of Bühlertann
- Location within Germany Location within Baden-Württemberg
- Coordinates: 49°02′28″N 09°54′31″E
- Country: Germany
- State: Baden-Württemberg
- Admin. region: Stuttgart
- District: Schwäbisch Hall

Government
  - Mayor (2019–27): Florian Fallenbüchel

Area
  - Total: 23.59 km^{2} (9.11 sq mi)
- Elevation: 376 m (1,234 ft)

Population (2025-12-31)
  - Total: 3,052
  - Density: 129.4/km^{2} (335.1/sq mi)
- Time zone: UTC+01:00 (CET)
  - Summer (DST): UTC+02:00 (CEST)
- Postal codes: 74424
- Dialling codes: 07973, 07974
- Vehicle registration: SHA
- Website: www.buehlertann.de

Bühlertann (German pronunciation: [byːlɐˈtan]) is a municipality in the district of Schwäbisch Hall in Baden-Württemberg in Germany.
