= Kreßberg =

- Municipality
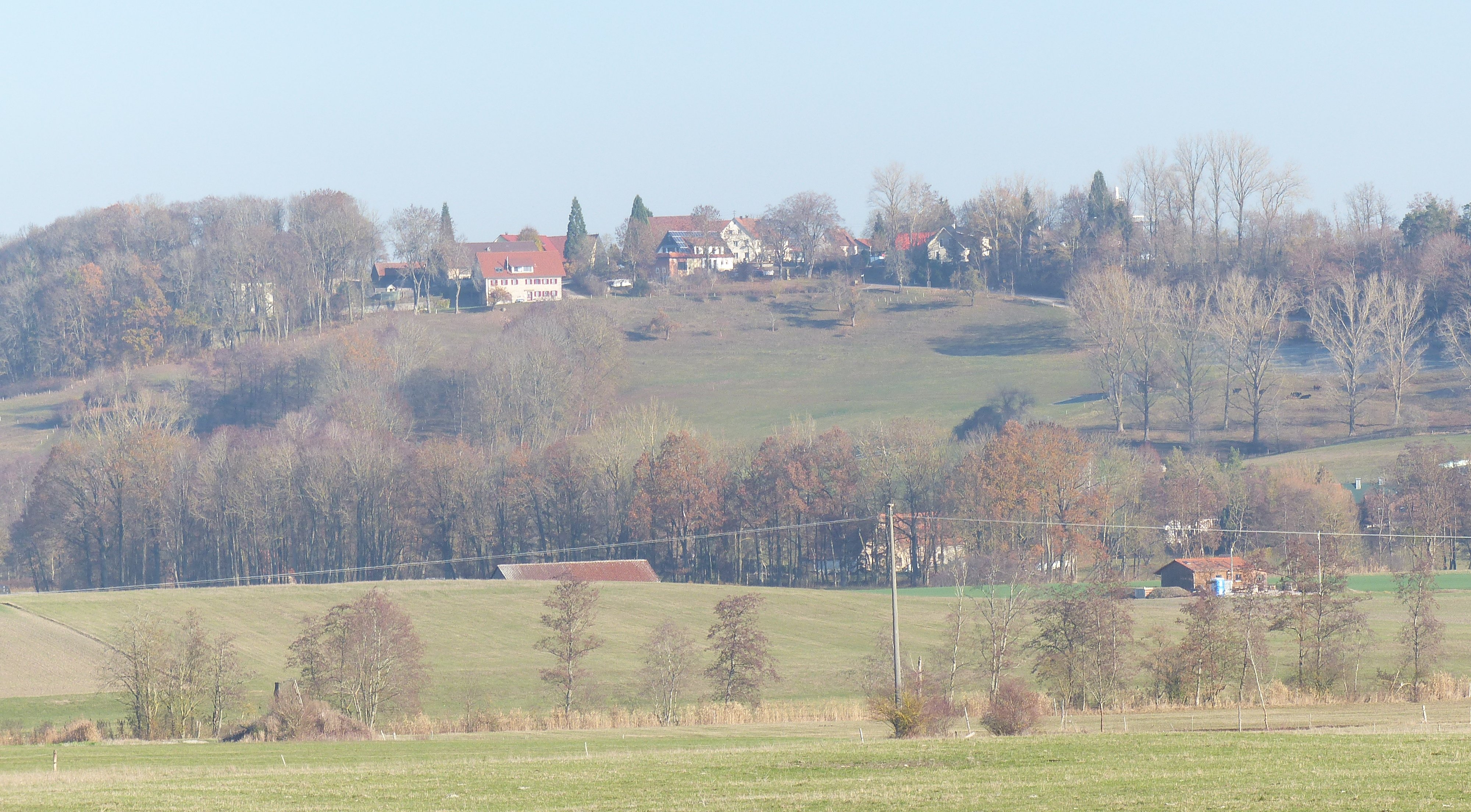

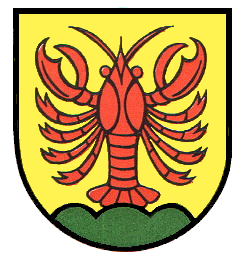
- Coat of arms

- Location of Kreßberg within Schwäbisch Hall district
- Interactive map of Kreßberg
- Location within Germany Location within Baden-Württemberg
- Coordinates: 49°07′52″N 10°11′03″E
- Country: Germany
- State: Baden-Württemberg
- Admin. region: Stuttgart
- District: Schwäbisch Hall
- Subdivisions: 33 Teilorte

Government
  - Mayor (2021–29): Annemarie Mürter-Mayer

Area
  - Total: 48.46 km^{2} (18.71 sq mi)
- Elevation: 470 m (1,540 ft)

Population (2025-12-31)
  - Total: 4,059
  - Density: 83.76/km^{2} (216.9/sq mi)
- Time zone: UTC+01:00 (CET)
  - Summer (DST): UTC+02:00 (CEST)
- Postal codes: 74594
- Dialling codes: 07957
- Vehicle registration: SHA
- Website: www.kressberg.de

Kreßberg is a municipality in the district of Schwäbisch Hall in Baden-Württemberg in Germany. No town or village has that name.

The community of Kreßberg consists of 33 separate villages:

Waldtann, Marktlustenau, Mariäkappel, Leukershausen, Bergbronn, Bergertshofen, Wüstenau, Riegelbach, Rötsweiler, Stegenhof, Schwarzenhorb, Hohenberg, Selgenstadt, Vötschenhof, Oberstelzhausen, Unterstelzhausen, Tempelhof, Hohenkreßberg, Gaisbühl, Schönbronn, Bräunersberg, Halden, Vehlenberg, Ruppersbach, Asbach, Haselhof, Waidmannsberg, Mistlau, Neuhaus, Sixenhof, Rudolfsberg, Schönmühle, and Rotmühle

The total population figure of Kreßberg is just 3788 (2010).

First settlements in the Kreßberg area were established between the 7th and the 9th centuries. The community in its current dimensions has existed since 1 January 1973, when the former communities of Waldtann, Marktlustenau, Mariäkappel, and Leukershausen were combined during the municipal reform.
