= Kirchberg an der Jagst =

- Town
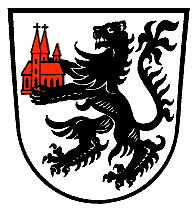
- Coat of arms

- Location of Kirchberg an der Jagst within Schwäbisch Hall district
- Interactive map of Kirchberg an der Jagst
- Location within Germany Location within Baden-Württemberg
- Coordinates: 49°12′14″N 09°58′53″E
- Country: Germany
- State: Baden-Württemberg
- Admin. region: Stuttgart
- District: Schwäbisch Hall

Government
  - Mayor (2017–25): Stefan Ohr

Area
  - Total: 40.93 km^{2} (15.80 sq mi)
- Elevation: 384 m (1,260 ft)

Population (2025-12-31)
  - Total: 4,149
  - Density: 101.4/km^{2} (262.5/sq mi)
- Time zone: UTC+01:00 (CET)
  - Summer (DST): UTC+02:00 (CEST)
- Postal codes: 74592
- Dialling codes: 07954
- Vehicle registration: SHA
- Website: www.kirchberg-jagst.de

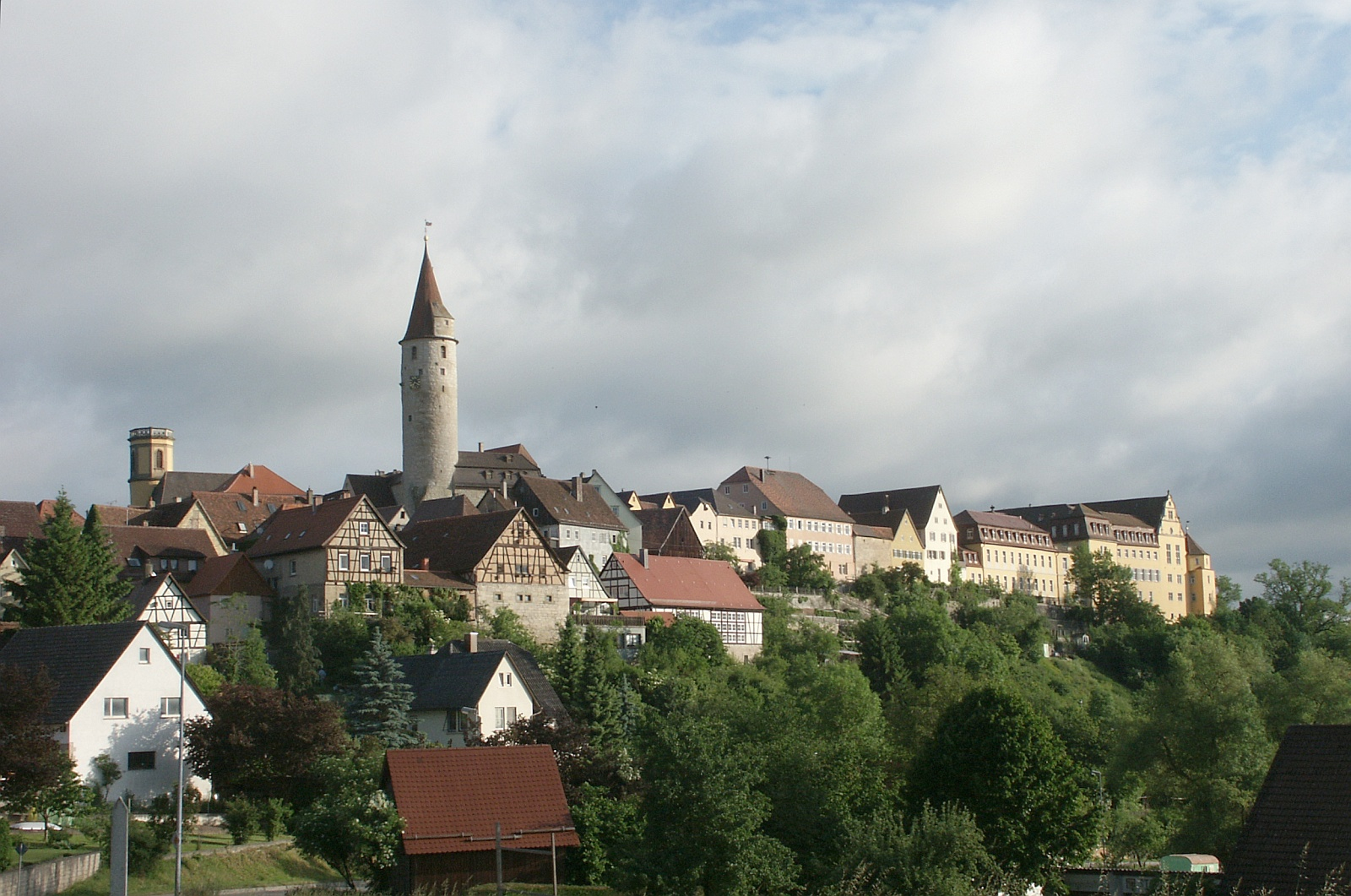
The old town of Kirchberg

Kirchberg an der Jagst (German pronunciation: [ˈkɪʁçbɛʁk ʔan deːɐ̯ ˈjakst], lit. 'Kirchberg on the Jagst') is a town in the district of Schwäbisch Hall, in Baden-Württemberg, Germany. It is located on the river Jagst, 11 km northwest of Crailsheim.

The Second World War resistance member Friedrich Gustav Jaeger was born here.

== Politics ==
Elections for the local council (Gemeinderat) in 2014:

- Unabhängige Wählervereinigung (Independent voters association): 7 seats
- Aktive Bürger (active citizens) 8 seats
- Unabhängige Grüne Liste (Independent green list) 5 seats
