= Ilshofen =

- Town
- Coat of arms

- Location of Ilshofen within Schwäbisch Hall district
- Interactive map of Ilshofen
- Location within Germany Location within Baden-Württemberg
- Coordinates: 49°10′13″N 09°55′13″E
- Country: Germany
- State: Baden-Württemberg
- Admin. region: Stuttgart
- District: Schwäbisch Hall

Government
  - Mayor (2018–26): Martin Blessing

Area
  - Total: 54.87 km^{2} (21.19 sq mi)
- Elevation: 441 m (1,447 ft)

Population (2025-12-31)
  - Total: 7,080
  - Density: 129/km^{2} (334/sq mi)
- Time zone: UTC+01:00 (CET)
  - Summer (DST): UTC+02:00 (CEST)
- Postal codes: 74532
- Dialling codes: 07904
- Vehicle registration: SHA
- Website: www.ilshofen.de

Ilshofen (German: [ɪlsˈhoːfn̩]) is a town in the district of Schwäbisch Hall, in Baden-Württemberg, Germany. It is located 15 km northeast of Schwäbisch Hall.
