= Obersontheim =

- Municipality
- Coat of arms

- Location of Obersontheim within Schwäbisch Hall district
- Interactive map of Obersontheim
- Location within Germany Location within Baden-Württemberg
- Coordinates: 49°03′28″N 09°53′48″E
- Country: Germany
- State: Baden-Württemberg
- Admin. region: Stuttgart
- District: Schwäbisch Hall

Government
  - Mayor (2021–29): Stephan Türke

Area
  - Total: 54.82 km^{2} (21.17 sq mi)
- Elevation: 379 m (1,243 ft)

Population (2025-12-31)
  - Total: 5,350
  - Density: 97.6/km^{2} (253/sq mi)
- Time zone: UTC+01:00 (CET)
  - Summer (DST): UTC+02:00 (CEST)
- Postal codes: 74423
- Dialling codes: 07973
- Vehicle registration: SHA
- Website: www.obersontheim.de

Obersontheim (German pronunciation: [oːbɐˈzɔnthaɪ̯m]) is a municipality in the district of Schwäbisch Hall in Baden-Württemberg in Germany.

Today the town includes a number of villages, including Untersontheim, Ummenhofen and Hausen.

== Demographics ==
Population development:

Year	Inhabitants
1990	3,955
2001	4,668
2011	4,691
2021	5,404
