= Wallhausen, Baden-Württemberg =

Wallhausen
- Municipality
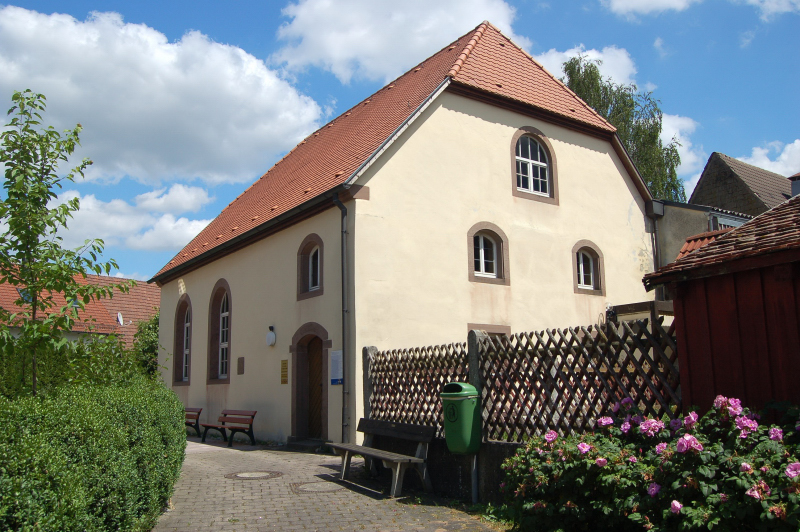
- Synagogue in Michelbach an der Lücke

- Coat of arms

- Location of Wallhausen within Schwäbisch Hall district
- Interactive map of Wallhausen
- Location within Germany Location within Baden-Württemberg
- Coordinates: 49°12′39″N 10°03′51″E
- Country: Germany
- State: Baden-Württemberg
- Admin. region: Stuttgart
- District: Schwäbisch Hall

Government
  - Mayor (2022–30): Andreas Frickinger

Area
  - Total: 25.47 km^{2} (9.83 sq mi)
- Elevation: 469 m (1,539 ft)

Population (2025-12-31)
  - Total: 3,652
  - Density: 143.4/km^{2} (371.4/sq mi)
- Time zone: UTC+01:00 (CET)
  - Summer (DST): UTC+02:00 (CEST)
- Postal codes: 74599
- Dialling codes: 07955
- Vehicle registration: SHA
- Website: www.gemeinde-wallhausen.de

Wallhausen (German pronunciation: [ˈvalˌhaʊzn̩]) is a municipality in the district of Schwäbisch Hall in Baden-Württemberg in Germany.

It contained the village of Hengstfeld and its hamlets of Asbach, Roßbürg and Schönbronn, incorporated into Wallhausen on 1 July 1974.

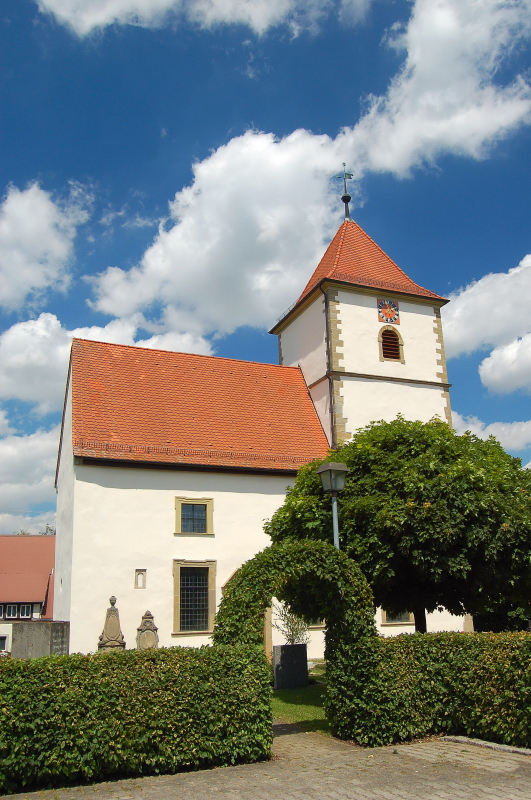
Jakobuskirche in the hamlet of Schainbach
