= Bühlerzell =

- Municipality
- Coat of arms

- Location of Bühlerzell within Schwäbisch Hall district
- Interactive map of Bühlerzell
- Location within Germany Location within Baden-Württemberg
- Coordinates: 49°00′11″N 09°55′08″E
- Country: Germany
- State: Baden-Württemberg
- Admin. region: Stuttgart
- District: Schwäbisch Hall

Government
  - Mayor (2017–25): Thomas Botschek

Area
  - Total: 49.32 km^{2} (19.04 sq mi)
- Elevation: 393 m (1,289 ft)

Population (2025-12-31)
  - Total: 2,076
  - Density: 42.09/km^{2} (109.0/sq mi)
- Time zone: UTC+01:00 (CET)
  - Summer (DST): UTC+02:00 (CEST)
- Postal codes: 74426
- Dialling codes: 07974
- Vehicle registration: SHA
- Website: www.buehlerzell.de

Bühlerzell (German pronunciation: [byːlɐˈt͡sɛl]) is a municipality in the district of Schwäbisch Hall in Baden-Württemberg in Germany.
