= Vellberg =

- Town
- Coat of arms

- Location of Vellberg within Schwäbisch Hall district
- Interactive map of Vellberg
- Location within Germany Location within Baden-Württemberg
- Coordinates: 49°05′16″N 09°52′54″E
- Country: Germany
- State: Baden-Württemberg
- Admin. region: Stuttgart
- District: Schwäbisch Hall

Government
  - Mayor (2023–31): Jürgen Reichert

Area
  - Total: 31.89 km^{2} (12.31 sq mi)
- Elevation: 375 m (1,230 ft)

Population (2025-12-31)
  - Total: 4,728
  - Density: 148.3/km^{2} (384.0/sq mi)
- Time zone: UTC+01:00 (CET)
  - Summer (DST): UTC+02:00 (CEST)
- Postal codes: 74541
- Dialling codes: 07907
- Vehicle registration: SHA
- Website: www.vellberg.de

Vellberg (German pronunciation: [ˈfɛlbɛʁk]) is a town in the district of Schwäbisch Hall, in Baden-Württemberg, Germany. It is located 10 km east of Schwäbisch Hall, and 15 km southwest of Crailsheim.

Vellberg in Schwäbisch Hall district

== Gallery ==
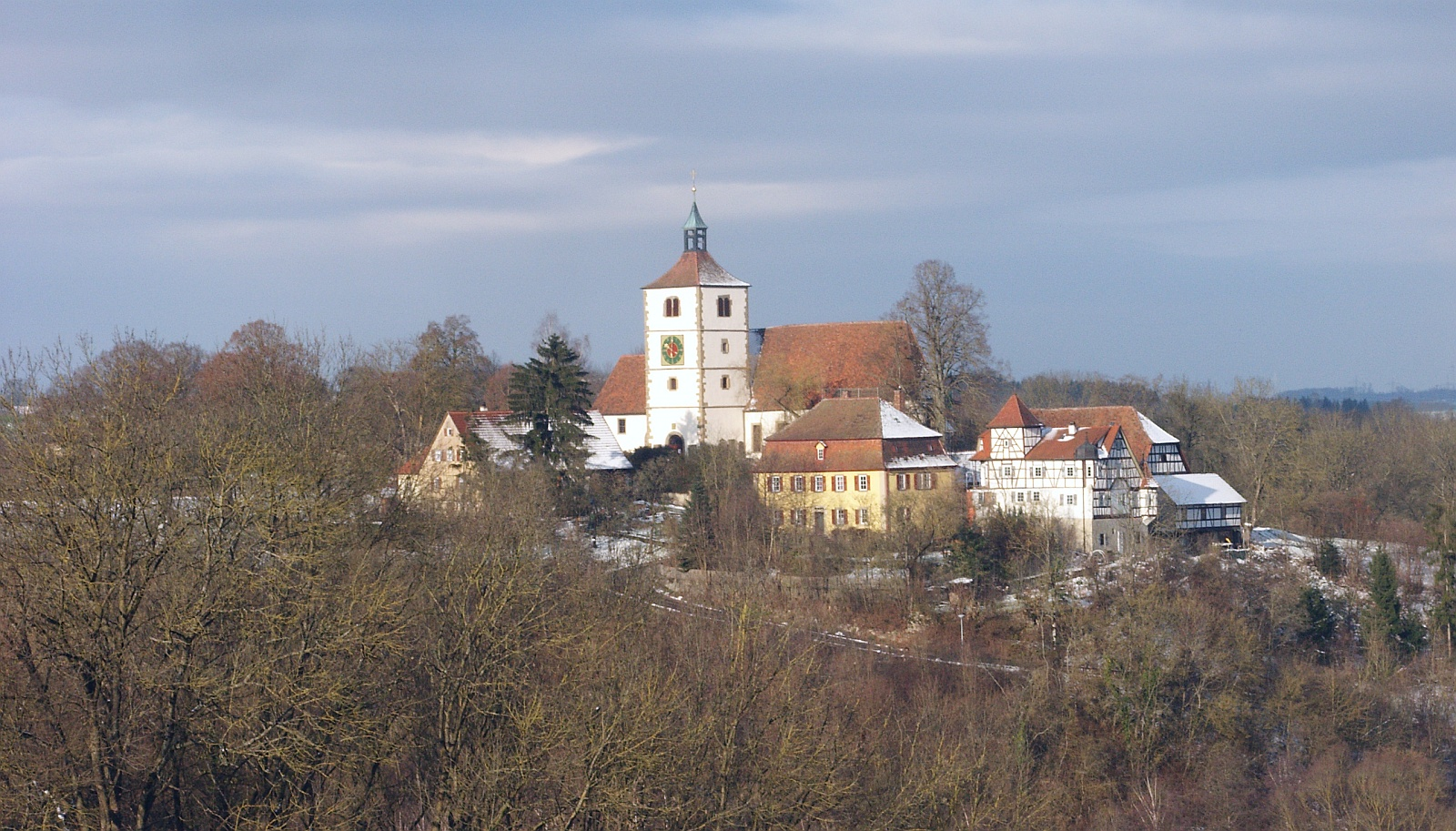
Vellberg's church St. Martin is commonly known as "Stöckenburg"

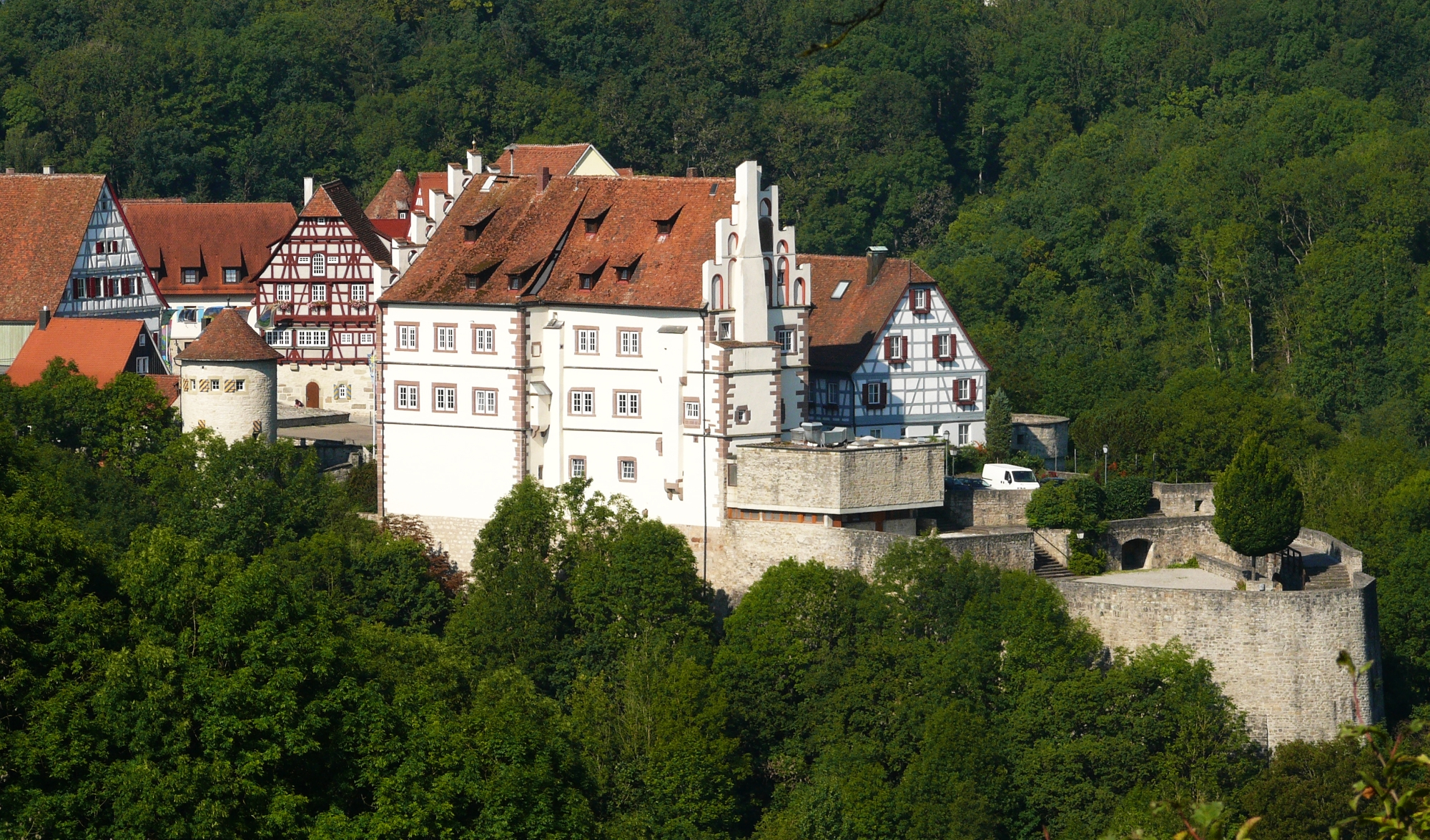
Burg Vellberg (Unteres Schloss, which means Lower Castle)
