= Backnang (electoral district) =

State electoral district of Germany

17: Backnang
- Electoral district for the Landtag of Baden-Württemberg
- Backnang in 2026
- District: Rems-Murr
- Electorate: 93,975 (2026)
- Major settlements: Alfdorf, Allmersbach im Tal, Althütte, Aspach, Auenwald, Backnang, Berglen, Burgstetten, Großerlach, Kaiserbach, Kirchberg an der Murr, Murrhardt, Oppenweiler, Spielberg, Sulzbach an der Murr, Weissach im Tal, and Welzheim

Current electoral district
- Party: CDU
- Member: Jens Steinat

Backnang is an electoral constituency (German: Wahlkreis) represented in the Landtag of Baden-Württemberg. Since 2026, it has elected one member via first-past-the-post voting. Voters cast a second vote under which additional seats are allocated proportionally state-wide. Under the constituency numbering system, it is designated as constituency 17. It is wholly within the district of Rems-Murr.

== Geography ==
The constituency includes the municipalities of Alfdorf, Allmersbach im Tal, Althütte, Aspach, Auenwald, Backnang, Berglen (since 2010), Burgstetten, Großerlach, Kaiserbach, Kirchberg an der Murr, Murrhardt, Oppenweiler, Spielberg, Sulzbach an der Murr, Weissach im Tal, and Welzheim, within the district of Rems-Murr.

There were 93,975 eligible voters in 2026.

== Members ==
=== First mandate ===
Both prior to and since the electoral reforms for the 2026 election, the winner of the plurality of the vote (first-past-the-post) in every constituency won the first mandate.

Election	Member	Party	%
1976	Erich Schneider	CDU	
1980	Erich Schneider	CDU	
1984	Erich Schneider	CDU	
1988	Erich Schneider	CDU	
1992	Rosely Schweizer	CDU	
1996	Rosely Schweizer	CDU	
2001	Wilfried Klenk	CDU	42.2
2006	Wilfried Klenk	CDU	44.7
2011	Wilfried Klenk	CDU	40.8
2016	Wilfried Klenk	CDU	27.7
2021	Ralf Nentwich	Grüne	24.0
2026	Jens Steinat	CDU	34.5

=== Second mandate ===
Prior to the electoral reforms for the 2026 election, the seats in the state parliament were allocated proportionately amongst parties which received more than 5% of valid votes across the state. The seats that were won proportionally for parties that did not win as many first mandates as seats they were entitled to, were allocated to their candidates which received the highest proportion of the vote in their respective constituencies. This meant that following some elections, a constituency would have one or more members elected under a second mandate.

Prior to 2011, these second mandates were allocated to the party candidates who got the greatest number of votes, whilst from 2011-2021, these were allocated according to percentage share of the vote.

Prior to 2011, no second mandate members were elected in this constituency.

Election	Member	Party	Member	Party
2011	Wilhelm Halder	SPD		
2016	Wilhelm Halder	SPD	Jörg Meuthen	AfD
Jan 2018	Wilhelm Halder	SPD		
2021	Wilhelm Halder	SPD	Daniel Lindenschmid	AfD
Oct 2024	Simone Kirschbaum	SPD	Daniel Lindenschmid	AfD

== Election results ==
=== 2026 election ===
State election (2026): Backnang
Notes:	Blue background denotes the winner of the electorate vote. Pink background denotes a candidate elected from their party list. Yellow background denotes an electorate win by a list member, or other incumbent. A ✓ or ✗ denotes status of any incumbent, win or lose respectively.						
Party	Candidate	Votes	%	±%	Party votes	%	±%
CDU	Jens Steinat	23,006	34.5	▲11.3	19,719	29.5	▲6.3
AfD	Daniel Lindenschmid	16,661	25.0	▲12.9	16,400	24.5	▲12.4
Greens	✗ Ralf Nentwich	14,782	22.2	▼1.9	17,506	26.2	▲2.1
SPD	Simone Kirschbaum	5,144	7.7	▼11.3	3,286	4.9	▼14.1
FDP	Marc Juric	2,616	3.9	▼6.6	3,042	4.5	▼6.0
Left	Allegra Conrad	2,595	3.9	▲1.5	2,297	3.4	▲1.1
Pirate Party Germany	Philip Köngeter	1,191	1.8	Steady			
FW					1,112	1.7	▼0.2
BSW					987	1.5	
APT					614	0.9	
Volt	Damaris Lauffer	648	1.0		406	0.6	
PARTEI					335	0.5	▼1.1
dieBasis					276	0.4	▼0.9
Bündnis C					225	0.3	
Values					169	0.3	
ÖDP					138	0.2	▼0.5
Pensioners					114	0.2	
Team Todenhöfer					77	0.1	
PdF					66	0.1	
Verjüngungsforschung					37	0.1	
KlimalisteBW					30	0.0	▼0.6
Humanists					22	0.0	
Informal votes		607			392		
Total valid votes		66,643			66,858		
Turnout		67,250	71.6	▲7.6			
CDU gain from Greens	Majority	6,345	9.5				

=== 2021 election ===
State election (2026): Backnang
Party	Candidate	Votes	%	±%
Greens	Ralf Nentwich	14,278	24.0	▲1.7
CDU	Georg Devrikis	13,791	23.2	▼4.5
SPD	Gernot Gruber	11,274	19.0	▲3.3
AfD	Daniel Lindenschmid	7,202	12.1	▼7.6
FDP	Charlotte Klinghoffer	6,243	10.5	▲2.5
Left	Annette Keles	1,406	2.4	▲0.3
FW	Konstantinos Kefalas	1,110	1.9	
Pirates	Philip Köngeter	1,062	1.8	▲0.6
PARTEI	Alexander Lisson	944	1.6	
dieBasis	Joachim Reymann	792	1.3	
WiR2020	Nico Mast	482	0.8	
ÖDP	Norbert Barthold	431	0.7	▼0.2
KlimalisteBW	Berthold Daubner	360	0.6	
Majority		488	0.8	
Rejected ballots		401	0.7	▼0.2
Turnout		59,777	64.0	▼8.2
Registered electors		93,471		
Greens gain from CDU		Swing		

== See also ==
- Politics of Baden-Württemberg
- Landtag of Baden-Württemberg
