= Löwenstein Hills =

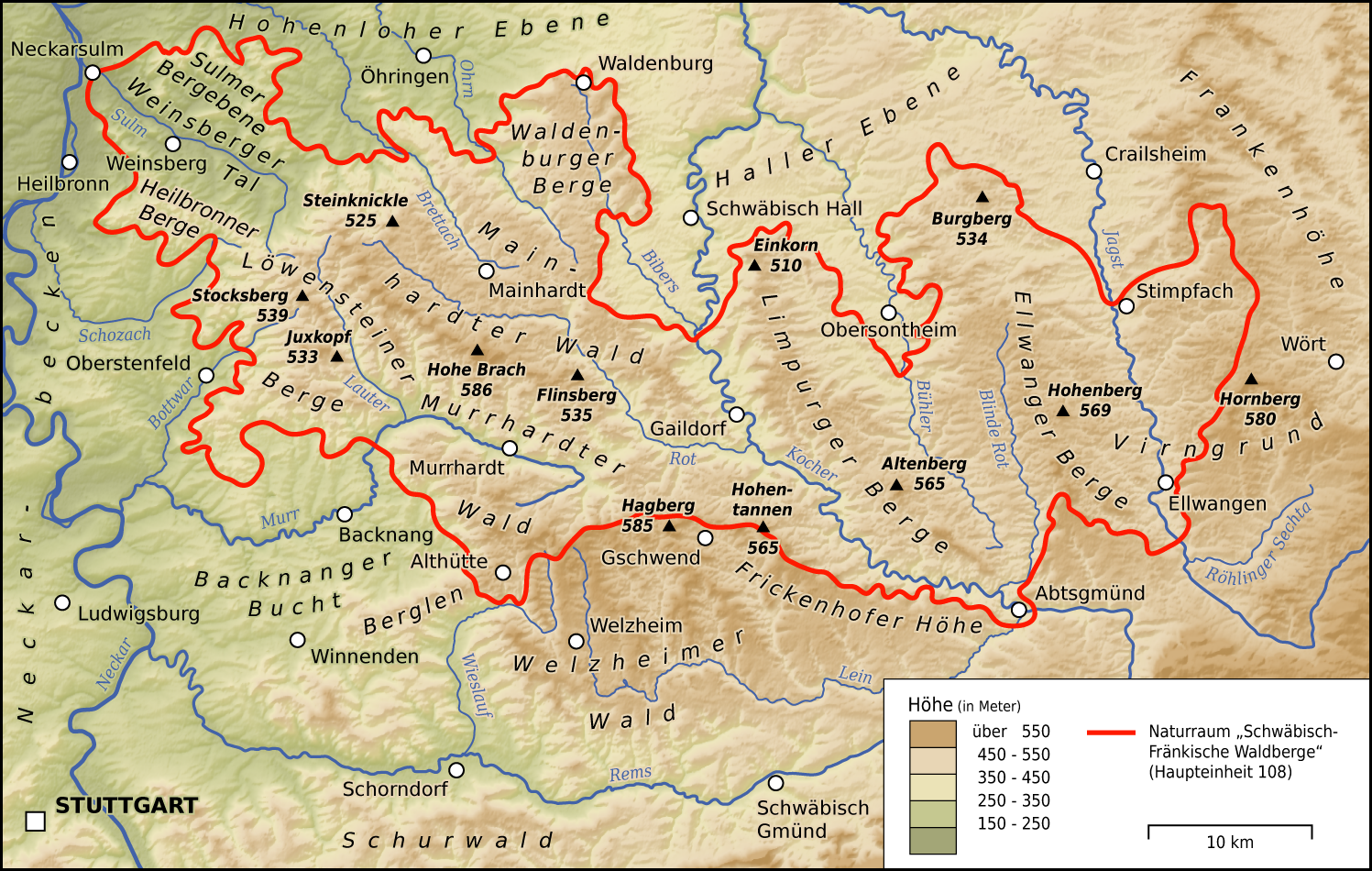
- The Lowenstein Hills west of the Swabian-Franconian Forest

Highest point
- Peak: Raitelberg
- Elevation: 561 m above NHN

Dimensions
- Length: 25.752 km (16.002 mi)

Geography
- State(s): Baden-Württemberg, Deutschland
- Range coordinates: 49°04′44″N 9°27′10″E
- Parent range: Swabian-Franconian Forest

Geology
- Orogeny: Bergland
- Rock type: Keuper

The Löwenstein Hills (German: Löwensteiner Berge) are a hill range up to 561 m above sea level (NHN), in the counties of Heilbronn, Ludwigsburg, Rems-Murr-Kreis and Hohenlohekreis in the German state of Baden-Württemberg. They are named after the town of Löwenstein.

== Geography ==
=== Location ===
According to the classification of the Handbook of Natural Region Divisions of Germany, the Löwenstein Hills are natural region number 108.1 in the Swabian-Franconian Forest in the Swabian Keuper-Lias Plains. Most of the range belongs to the Swabian-Franconian Forest Nature Park.

The forested hill country lies around 40 kilometres north-northeast of Stuttgart and about 20 kilometres east-southeast of Heilbronn between the Hohenlohe Plain to the north, the Mainhardt Forest to the northeast, the Murrhardt Forest to the southeast, the Backnang Bay to the south and the Neckar Basin to the west.

The Heilbronn Hills and the Sulm Plateau continue the Löwenstein Hills to the northwest and, in the Heilbronn Hills to the south reach as far as Weinsberg and Heilbronn and in the Sulm Plateau to the north reach as far as Bretzfeld, Eberstadt, Langenbrettach, Erlenbach and Neckarsulm.

On the northern edge of the range are the settlements of Löwenstein and Obersulm, to the east are Wüstenrot and Spiegelberg, to the south, Sulzbach an der Murr, Oppenweiler, Backnang and Aspach, and on the western rim are Oberstenfeld, Beilstein, Abstatt, Untergruppenbach and Lehrensteinsfeld.

To the south, west and north, mighty Keuper escarpments prominently mark the boundaries of the range with the Backnang Bay, Neckar Basin and Hohenlohe Plain. The valley of the Murr between Sulzbach and Oppenweiler separates the Lowenstein Hills from the Murrhardt Forest. The boundary with the adjacent Mainhardt Forest to the east is not clear from the terrain; it runs roughly from north to south, initially following the valley of the Gabelbach, a tributary of the Brettach, then via the settlement of Chausseehaus on the Bundesstraße 39 Federal road to the watershed on the ridge between the Lauter in the west and the Fischbach in the east, which it then follows.

In the sparsely populated Lowenstein Hills themselves there are only a few small settlements, The largest of which is Spiegelberg.

=== Hills ===
The highest point of the Löwenstein Hills, at 561.0 m, is the wooded Raitelberg west of Wüstenrot; roughly north of this "hill" is the Stangenberg (559.0 m). The forested Horkenberg between Löwenstein and Wüstenrot, at 549.0 m, is very high. The Stocksberg (538.9 m) which belongs to Beilstein and Löwenstein and the Juxkopf (533.1 m) near Spiegelberg with its Juxkopf Tower have good views. To the west in the Heilbronn forest area of the Heilbronn Hills is the Schweinsberg (372.8 m) and another observation tower, the Schweinsberg Tower, the Heilbronn Transmission Tower (Fernmeldeturm Heilbronn) and the Schweinsberg Water Tower (Hochbehälter Schweinsberg) owned by the Lake Constance water company, Bodensee-Wasserversorgung.

To the south where the hills transition into the Mainhardt Forest, the wooded Black Jurassic kuppen between the Lauter valley and Fischbach valley heights rise up to 565.7 m (Steinberg south of Wüstenrot).

=== Rivers and streams ===
The following rivers and larger streams drain the Lowenstein Hills or are catchment waters on its perimeter.

- The Murr rises not far from Murrhardt in the Murrhardt Forest, flows mainly westwards via Murrhardt and Backnang to Marbach, where it empties into the Neckar. Part of its course flows through the southeast of the Löwenstein Hills.
  - The Lauter rises near Löwenstein-Hirrweiler, flows southeastwards through Spiegelberg and discharges near Sulzbach into the Murr.
  - The Klöpferbach rises north of Rietenau, flows south through Aspach and joins the Murr near Backnang-Unterschöntal.
  - The Wüstenbach rises near Kleinaspach, flows mainly southwards and empties into the Murr between Burgstetten-Burgstall and Backnang.
  - The Bottwar rises near Prevorst, flows southwestwards via Großbottwar to Steinheim on the Murr, where it ends.
- The Schozach rises near Löwenstein, flows initially southwestwards through Abstatt to Ilsfeld and then northwestwards via Talheim to Heilbronn-Sontheim, where it discharges into the Neckar.
- The Sulm rises near Löwenstein, flows northwestwards through the Weinsberg valley (Weinsberger Tal) and empties near Neckarsulm into the Neckar.

== Geology ==
Geologically the Löwenstein Hills belong to the Germanic Trias supergroup of the earth's Triassic period and are counted as part of the Keuper, which means they were formed about 220 million years ago. The highest points are isolated Black Jurassic domed summits or kuppen, which lie on the Knollenmergel.

In the Löwenstein Hills there are numerous outcrops, rock formations and mining galleries, some of which have educational paths offering information about them:

- Aspach, Keuper educational path (10.3 km) north of the village of Rietenau with several outcrops and 21 stations covering topics from gypsum keuper (Grabfeld Formation) to Stuben sandstone
- Obersulm-Eichelberg, the Hohlenstein: a natural rock arch, about 14 metres long, made of Stuben sandstone
- Obersulm-Eichelberg, the Kolbensteige: an outcrop with rocks ranging from the Lower Bunter Marl to the Lowest Stuben sandstone on the bank of a sunken road
- Spiegelberg-Vorderbüchelberg, the Bodenbach Gorge: an erosion gorge of Stuben sandstone with a 30-metre-wide rock shelter, the Hohler Stein, and a small waterfall
- Spiegelberg-Jux, the Hüttenwald Gorge: an erosion gorge, Upper Bunter Marl and Stuben sandstone
- Spiegelberg-Jux, the Wetzsteinstollen, a mining gallery in the gravel sandstone, worked until 1923, in the valley of the Winterlauter
- Spiegelberg-Nassach: Mining educational path in the valley of the Winterlauter with evidence of the mining of coal, construction rock, sand pits for glassmaking and the Wetzstein gallery.
- Untergruppenbach: south of the motorway junction, a marl pit in the Lower Bunter Estherian beds of the gypsum keuper
- Untergruppenbach-Unterheinriet: sunken road and quarry on the southern Hohberg in the reed sandstone
- Wüstenrot, Pfaffenklinge: erosion gorge in the Stuben sandstone and Knollenmergel with two galleries from the 18th century, in which only pyrites was found instead of the hoped-for silver.

== Literature ==
- Thomas Huth und Baldur Junker: Geotouristische Karte von Baden-Württemberg 1:200 000 NORD. Erläuterungen. Regierungspräsidium Freiburg, Landesamt für Geologie, Rohstoffe und Bergbau, Freiburg i. Br. 2005.
