= Althütte =

German municipality

- Municipality
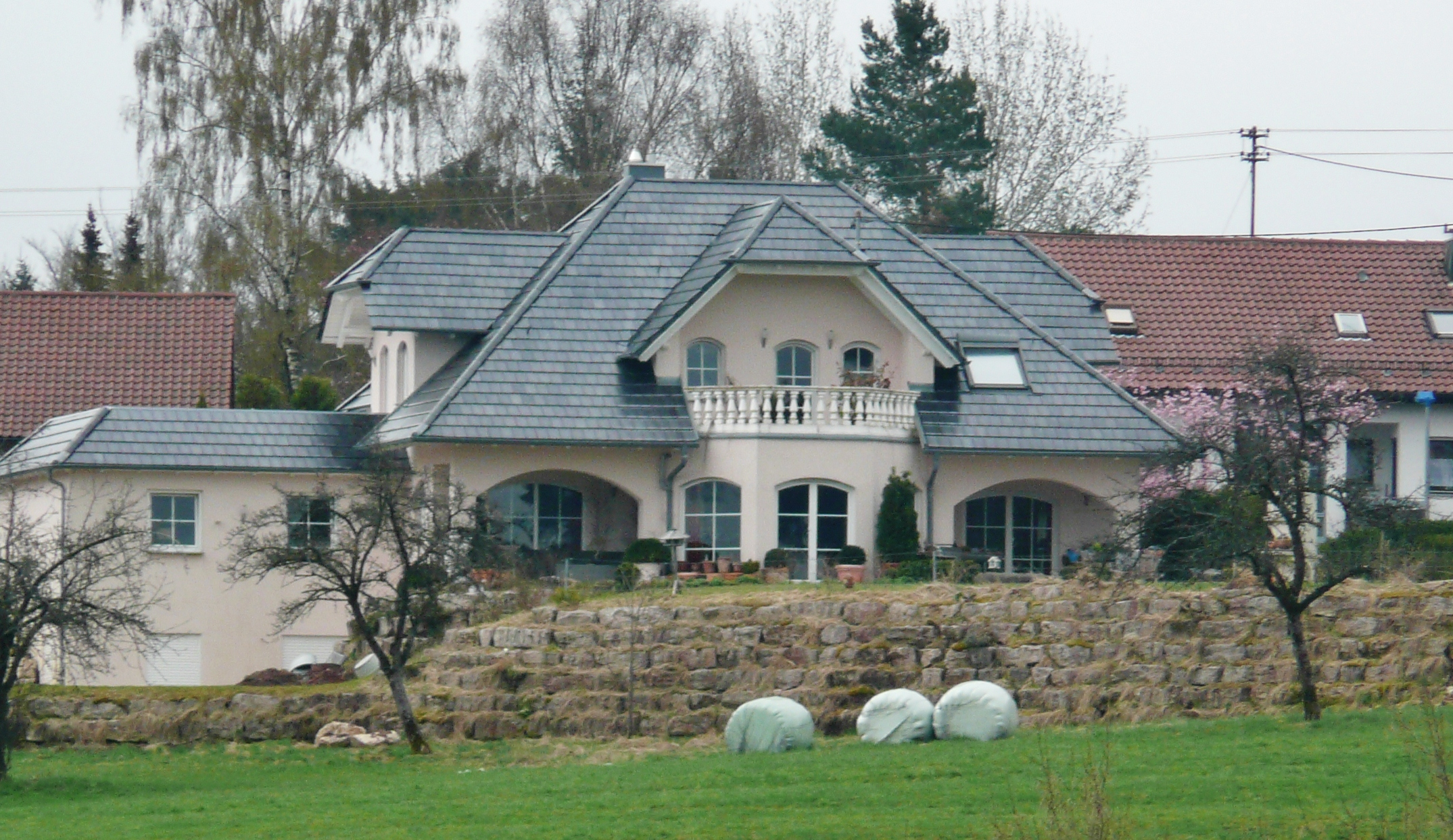

- Coat of arms

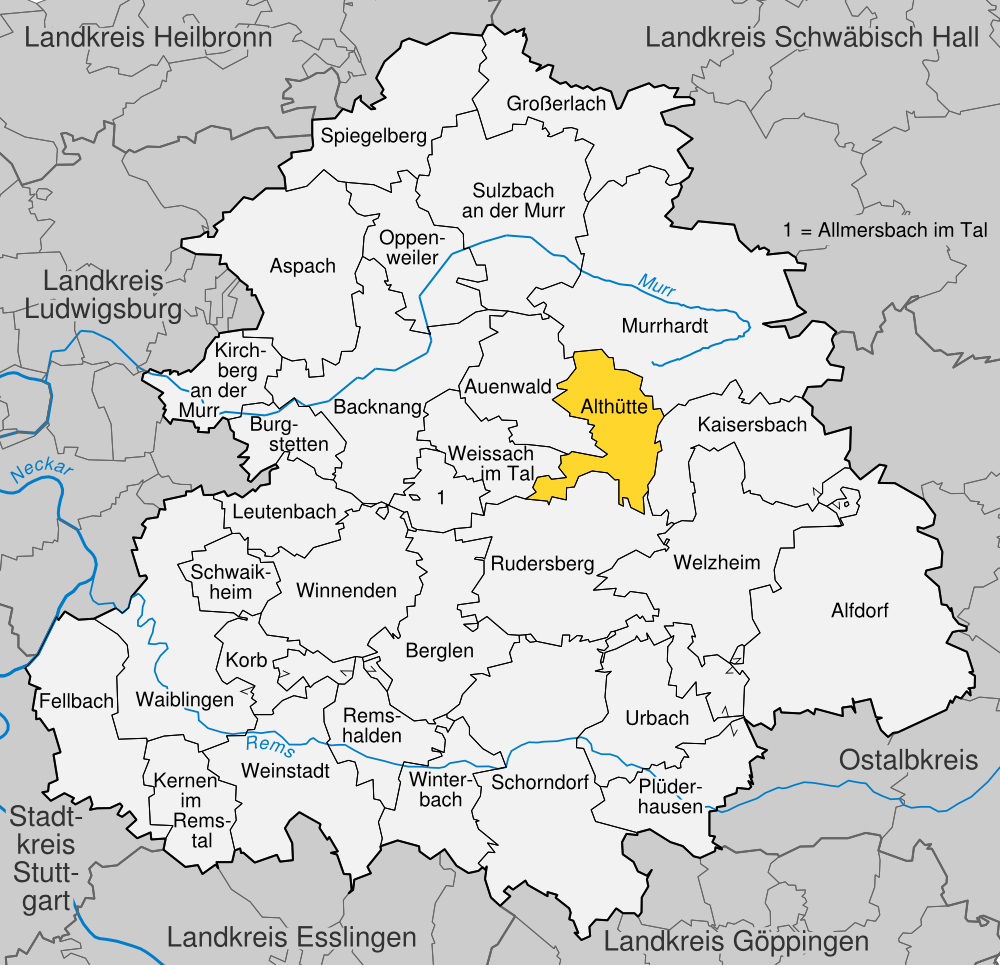
- Location of Althütte within Rems-Murr-Kreis district
- Interactive map of Althütte
- Location within Germany Location within Baden-Württemberg
- Coordinates: 48°54′47″N 09°34′19″E
- Country: Germany
- State: Baden-Württemberg
- Admin. region: Stuttgart
- District: Rems-Murr-Kreis

Area
  - Total: 18.15 km^{2} (7.01 sq mi)
- Elevation: 497 m (1,631 ft)

Population (2025-12-31)
  - Total: 4,156
  - Density: 229.0/km^{2} (593.1/sq mi)
- Time zone: UTC+01:00 (CET)
  - Summer (DST): UTC+02:00 (CEST)
- Postal codes: 71566
- Dialling codes: 07183
- Vehicle registration: WN
- Website: www.althuette.de

Althütte is a municipality of the Rems-Murr district in Baden-Württemberg, Germany.

== History ==
The modern municipality of Althütte was formed by the merging of the villages of Althütte and Sechselberg in 1971.

== Geography ==
The municipality (Gemeinde) of Althütte is located in the Rems-Murr district, in the German state of Baden-Württemberg. Althütte is physically located in the Murrhardt Forest, a region of the larger Swabian-Franconian Forest. Elevation above sea level in the municipal area ranges from a high of 571 meters (1,873 ft) Normalnull (NN) to a low of 339 meters (1,112 ft) NN.

Portions of the Federally protected Hörschbachschlucht and Strümpfelbach valley nature reserves are located in Althütte's municipal area.

== Politics ==
Althütte has two boroughs (Ortsteile), Althütte and Sechselberg, and 16 villages: Fautspach, Gallenhof, Glaitenhof, Hahnenhof, Hörschhof, Hörschhöfer Sägmühle, Kallenberg, Klösterle, Lutzenberg, Nonnenmühle, Rottmannsberger Sägmühle, Schlichenhöfle, Schlichenweiler, Schöllhütte, Voggenhof, and Waldenweiler. Althütte is in an mutually-beneficial municipal association with the city of Backnang and the municipalities of Allmersbach im Tal, Aspach, Auenwald, Burgstetten, Kirchberg an der Murr, Oppenweiler, and Weissach im Tal.

=== Coat of arms ===
Althütte's municipal coat of arms displays two white glassblowing pipes crossed over a field of blue. The coat of arms refers to the name Althütte and to Althütte's history of glassworking. This coat of arms was created from a proposal by the Central State Archive Stuttgart in 1924.

== Transportation ==
Althütte is connected to Germany's network of roadways by its local Landesstraßen and Kreisstraßen. Local public transportation is provided by the Verkehrs- und Tarifverbund Stuttgart.
