= Allmersbach =

German municipality

Allmersbach im Tal
- Municipality
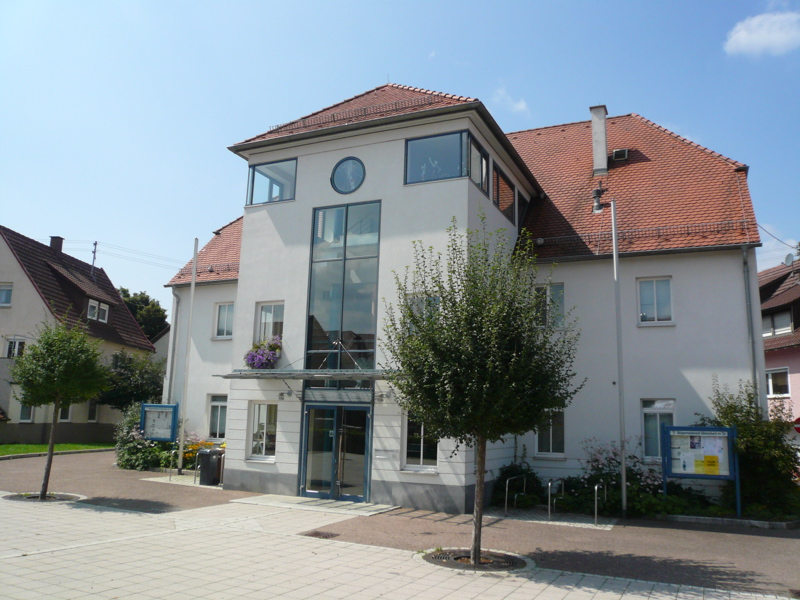
- Allmersbach town hall

- Coat of arms

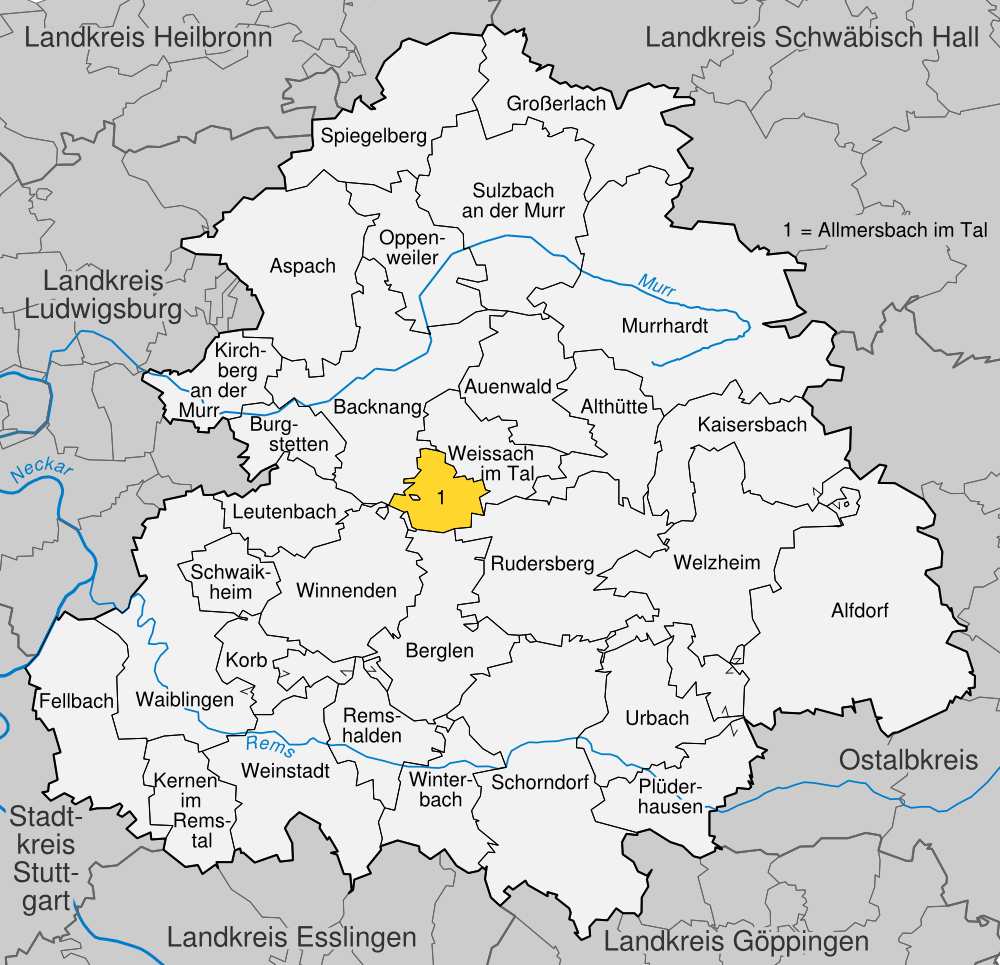
- Location of Allmersbach im Tal within Rems-Murr-Kreis district
- Interactive map of Allmersbach im Tal
- Location within Germany Location within Baden-Württemberg
- Coordinates: 48°54′23″N 09°28′08″E
- Country: Germany
- State: Baden-Württemberg
- Admin. region: Stuttgart
- District: Rems-Murr-Kreis

Area
  - Total: 7.96 km^{2} (3.07 sq mi)
- Elevation: 286 m (938 ft)

Population (2025-12-31)
  - Total: 4,914
  - Density: 617/km^{2} (1,600/sq mi)
- Time zone: UTC+01:00 (CET)
  - Summer (DST): UTC+02:00 (CEST)
- Postal codes: 71573
- Dialling codes: 07191
- Vehicle registration: WN, BK
- Website: www.allmersbach.de

Allmersbach im Tal (German pronunciation: [ˈalmɐsbax ʔɪm ˈtaːl], lit. 'Allmersbach in the Valley') is a municipality in the Rems-Murr district of Baden-Württemberg, Germany. It belongs to the Stuttgart Region (middle Neckar Region until 1992) and to the boundary area of the Stuttgart Metropolitan Region.

== History ==
Allmersbach im Tal was first mentioned in 1291, relating to the gifting of goods from the Countess Richinza von Löwenstein to the Teutonic Order of Winnenden. Owing to this gifting, Manorialism came into the hands of the Dominican Monastery Weiler bei Esslingen. In the 16th century the Reformation lead to the town falling under the jurisdiction of Württemberg. Until 1712 Allmersbach im Tal belonged to the monastery court mastery and until 1807 to the monasterial administration of the monastery Weiler bei Esslingen.

With the new administrative structure of the Kingdom of Württemberg, Allmersbach was assigned to the Backnang offices.

During NS-rule, 1938 reforms assigned Allmersbach to the Backnang district. In 1945 the town was a part of the American Zone of the Ally occupied Germany, this made it a part of the newly founded Württemberg-Baden which then dissolved into the state Baden-Württemberg.

The municipality of Allmersbach im Tal was formed on 1 January 1972, as part of the 1968-75 Baden-Württemberg municipal reforms, by the merging of the towns of Allmersbach and Heutensbach.

== Geography ==
The municipality (Gemeinde) of Allmersbach lies at the center of the Rems-Murr district of Baden-Württemberg, one of the 16 States of the Federal Republic of Germany. Allmersbach is physically located in the Neckar basin and the southwest edge of the Backnanger Bucht. The municipal area also includes portions of the Schurwald and Welzheim Forest. Elevation above sea level in the municipal area ranges from a high of 462 meters (1,516 ft) Normalnull (NN) to a low of 414 meters (1,358 ft) NN.

The Federally-protected Sommerrain nature reserve is located in Allmersbach's municipal area.

== Politics ==
Allmersbach is in a municipal association (Verwaltungsgemeinschaft) with the city of Backnang and the municipalities of Althütte, Aspach, Auenwald, Burgstetten, Kirchberg an der Murr, Oppenweiler, and Weissach im Tal.

=== Mayors ===
- 1975–1999: Rüdiger Kieninger
- 1999–2021: Ralf Wörner
- since 2021: Patrizia Rall

=== Coat of arms ===
Allmersbach's coat of arms displays a crossbow, in red and with its trigger guard facing right, upon a field of silver. The crossbow is a motif that has been associated with Allmersbach since 1686, though it is not known why, and the tincture is taken from the arms of the County of Löwenstein, which had property in the town. The coat of arms was approved for official use and a corresponding municipal flag issued by the Federal Ministry of the Interior on 16 September 1965.

== Transportation ==
Allermsbach is connected to German's network of roadways by its local Landesstraßen and Kreisstraßen. Local public transportation is provided by the Verkehrs- und Tarifverbund Stuttgart.
