= Wilfried Klenk =

German politician

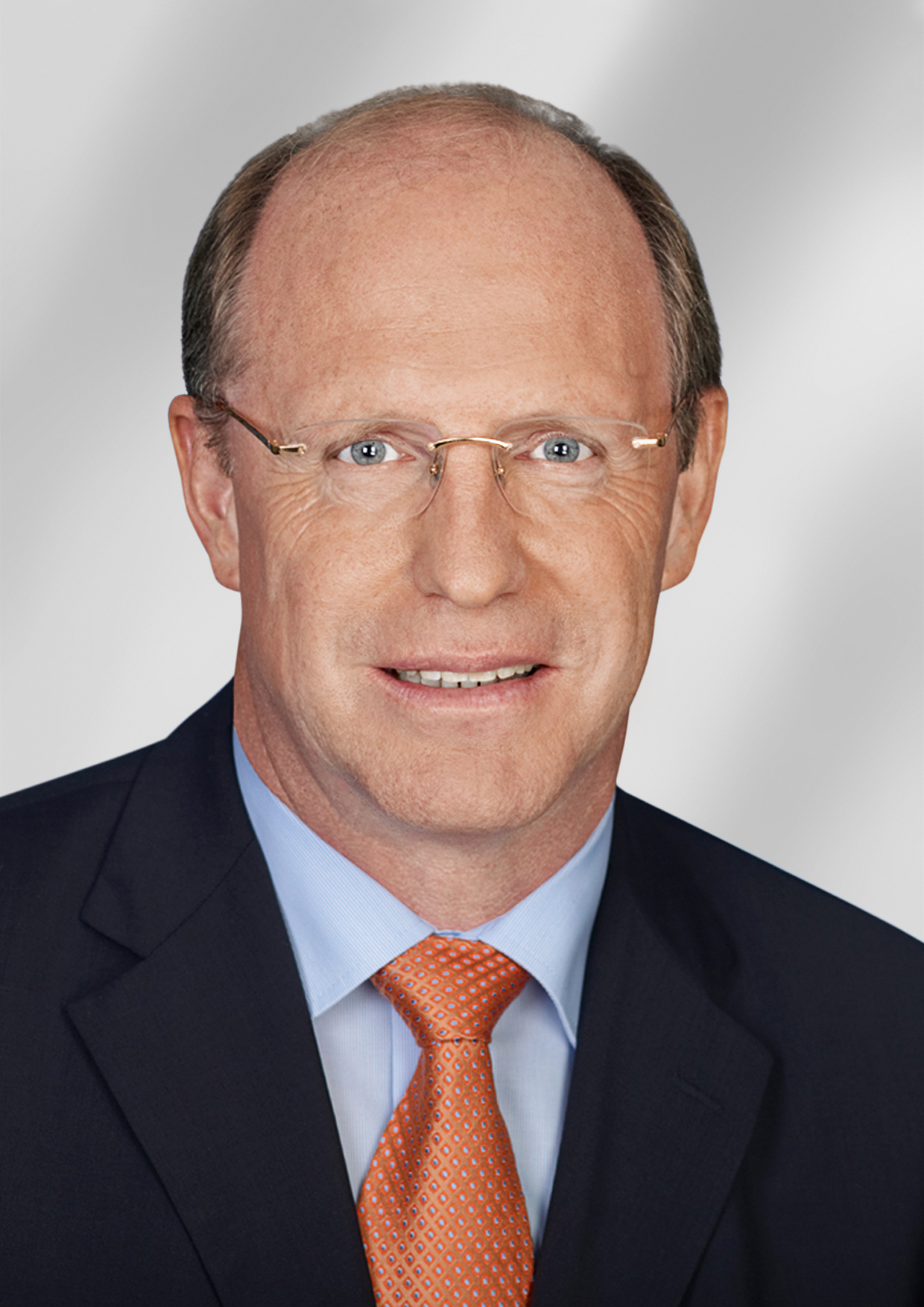

President of the Landtag of Baden-Württemberg
- In office February 2015 – May 2016
- Preceded by: Guido Wolf (politician)
- Succeeded by: Muhterem Aras

Member of the Landtag of Baden-Württemberg for Backnang
- Incumbent
- Assumed office 12 April 2001

Deputy mayor of Oppenweiler
- In office February 2017 – March 2018

District councillor in Rems-Murr-Kreis
- In office 1999–2018

Municipal councillor in Oppenweiler
- In office 1980–2018

Personal details
- Born: March 3, 1959 (age 67) Oppenweiler, West Germany
- Party: Christian Democratic Union of Germany

Wilfried Klenk (born 3 March 1959) is a German politician (CDU) who served as President of the Landtag of Baden-Württemberg from 2015 to 2016.

== Biography ==
Born in Oppenweiler, Klenk trained as a paramedic and was admitted to the Academy for Crisis Management, Emergency Planning and Civil Defense (de). He headed ambulance stations at Murrhardt and Backnang, and was head of the Stuttgart Rescue Service and the Oberleitstelle Baden-Württemberg.

He has served as a municipal councillor, deputy mayor, and the CDU's chapter in Oppenweiler. From 1999 to 2018 he served as a district councillor in Rems-Murr-Kreis.

He has served in the Landtag of Baden-Württemberg since 2001, and was President of the Landtag of Baden-Württemberg from 2015 to 2016.

He has served in the German Red Cross since 1973. He is married with one child.
