= Murr (river) =

River in Germany

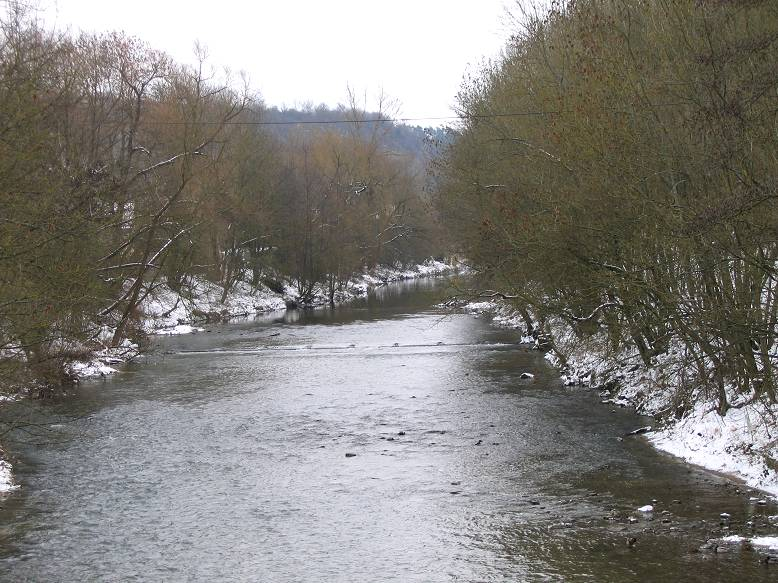
- The Murr near Steinheim

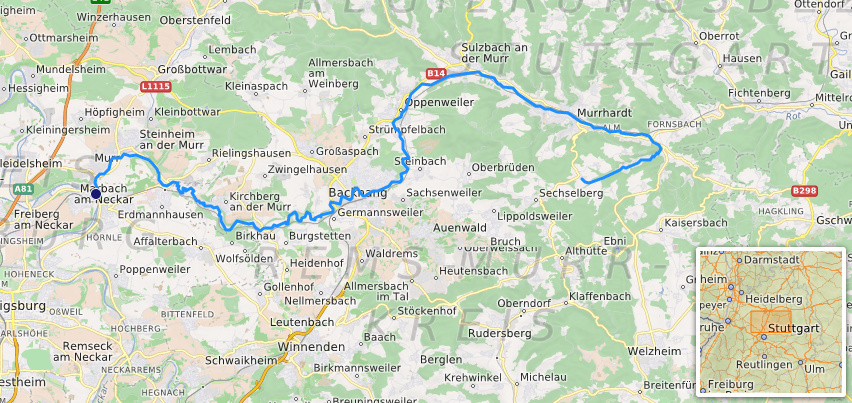

Location
- Country: Germany
- State: Baden-Württemberg

Physical characteristics
- Source
  - location: Swabia
- Mouth
  - location: Neckar
  - coordinates: 48°56′48″N 9°15′5″E
- Length: 51.8 km (32.2 mi)
- Basin size: 507 km^{2} (196 sq mi)

Basin features
- Progression: Neckar→ Rhine→ North Sea

The Murr (German: [mʊʁ]) is a river in Baden-Württemberg, Germany. It is a right tributary of the Neckar. The river gave its name to a small town on its banks, Murr, and to the Rems-Murr-Kreis district, which was also named after the river Rems, which runs roughly parallel to the south of the Murr.

Its source is approximately 4 km south of Murrhardt. It flows northeast before turning west to cross Murrhardt. After a further 7 km, Sulzbach an der Murr is reached. Here, at its northernmost point, the Lauter joins from the north, coming from Spiegelberg. The Murr continues southwest, passing Oppenweiler to reach Backnang, where its narrow valley widens. Further towns on its way are Burgstall an der Murr, Kirchberg an der Murr, Steinheim an der Murr, and the community of Murr itself, which is located in the district of Ludwigsburg.

North of Marbach am Neckar, the Murr joins the Neckar after having travelled about 50 km in total.

The Murr runs south of the Löwenstein Hills. A large part of the river is situated in the Swabian-Franconian Forest, after which the eponymous nature park was named.

== Name ==
The name Murr is of Celtic origin, means something like "musty river" and comes from the muddy water of the river. An early mention of the name Murr is in the Roman settlement vicus murrensis, which was a camp village situated near Benningen am Neckar or near Murrhardt.

The medieval Franconian Murrgau as well as the present Rems-Murr-Kreis are named after the river. Beside it Murr appears in the designations of some places at the run, approximately in shape of the rear name addition "at the Murr".

== Geography ==
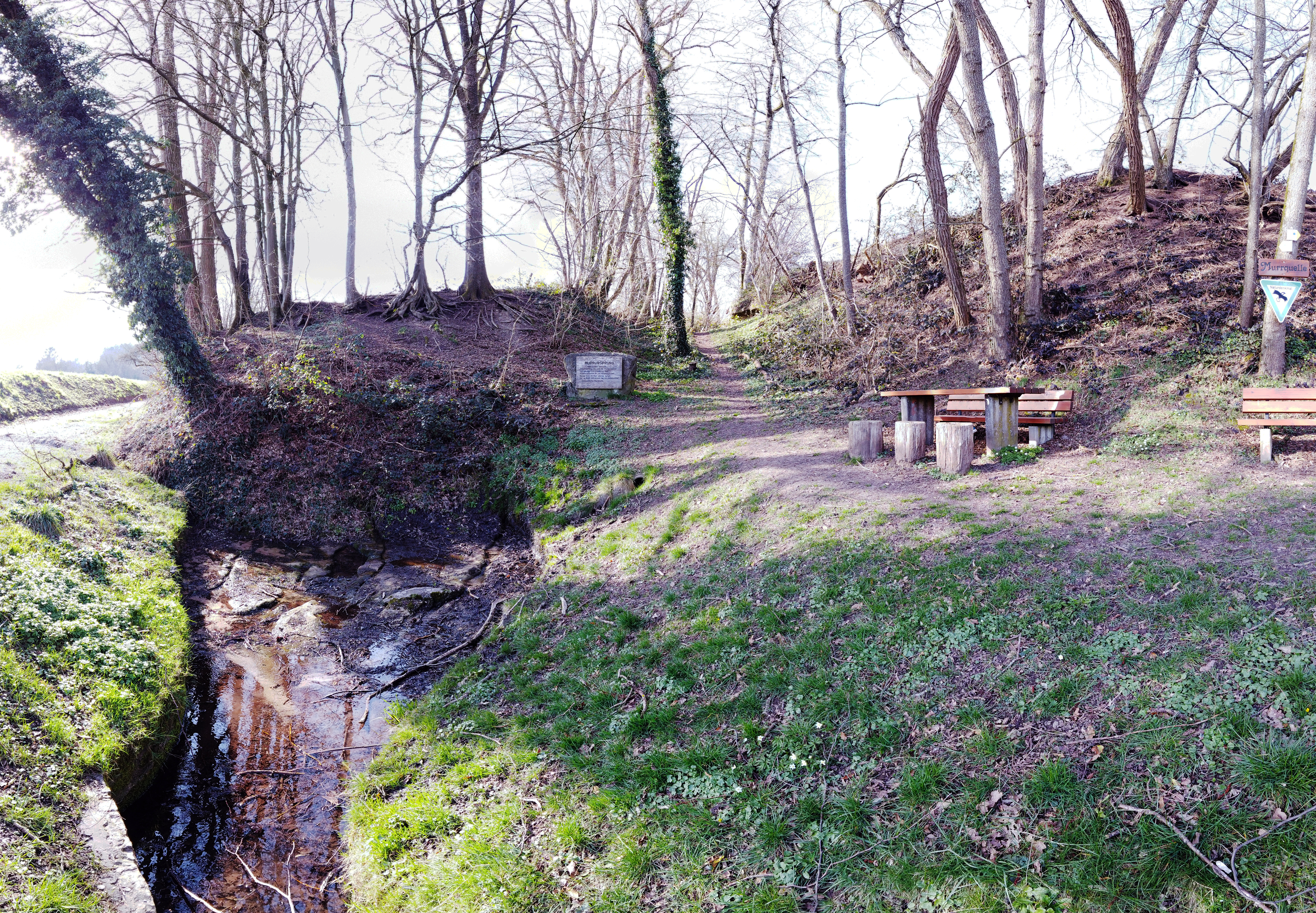
The source of the Murr near Vorderwestermurr

=== Sources ===
The source area of the Murr is located 3 km south of the city Murrhardt on the heights of the Murrhardter forest. At the southern outskirts of the hamlet Vorderwestermurr, a sign shows a spring box as "Murrursprung". Because of its strong and reliable discharge of two liters per second even in dry periods, it is regarded as main-source of the Murr, even if several small brooks near Vorderwestermurr and Fautspach lie higher and further from the confluence.

=== Course ===
==== From the source to the western bend of the Fornsbach tributary ====
In the uppermost run, the Murr moves to the northeast. From its source, which still lies in the Lion's Arch formation, it digs its way through the underlying layers of the Keupers a deep forest klinge, in which the Vorderwestermurrer Mühle is the only settlement in which, after several small waterfalls, they quickly descended the geological strata to the Untere Bunte Mergeln. Further down in its steep valley, it enters the field in a valley spider at the Klettenhöfle. It passes the almost equally small settlements of Klingen and Hammerschmiede, where it reaches the Gipskeuper Formation and shortly after the Lower Keuper.

Here its valley widens strongly, and it goes in the wide valley level of the "Fornsbacher Talspinne" into a narrow bend of almost 150° to the left, in whose course it - the Westermurr, thus western Murr - successively only the right Otterbach - also called Mettelbach, the middle brook - from the south, then at the iron forge mill the right Fornsbach - front brook - from the east, to which two shortly before larger brooks from still other directions flowed.

==== From Fornsbach to "Spiegelberger" Lauter ====
Afterwards it is on west course, the direction of the inflowing Fornsbach, whose length here exceeds hers. Its broad valley floor below the slopes, which are still wooded at medium altitude, now offers space for more important traffic routes. Accompanied by the L 1066 and the railroad line Waiblingen-Schwäbisch Hall-Hessental, it passes the Wahlenmühle, Hausen and the Lutzensägmühle, and after passing the alpine pasture settlement on its right, where once the Upper Germanic-Raetian Limes crossed its valley, it finally flows into the core town of Murrhardt; the city is the largest settlement on its upper reaches. On the western edge of its old town the Dentelbach from the north, further down the valley the Hörschbach from the south, at the edge of its settlement and shortly before the western city limits the Harbach flows through the hamlet Harbach again from the north.

In the area of the adjacent community Sulzbach, its course turns slightly north-northwest, it flows past Schleißweiler on the right, where the Eschelbach flows in from the left, and left at Bartenbach, through which the Haselbach reaches it again from the north. Then the valley curves slowly southwards again, the Murr reaches its northernmost point in Sulzbach itself, near which the Fischbach flows, which is also a southern tributary. Here also from direction Mainhardt the B 14 rises into the valley and continues the L 1066 as a large valley road. Just outside the village the ("Spiegelberger") Lauter, in whose valley the L 1066 turns off from the B 14, then the Murr flows into the area of Oppenweiler.

==== From the Lauter to the entrance of the Backnang bay ====
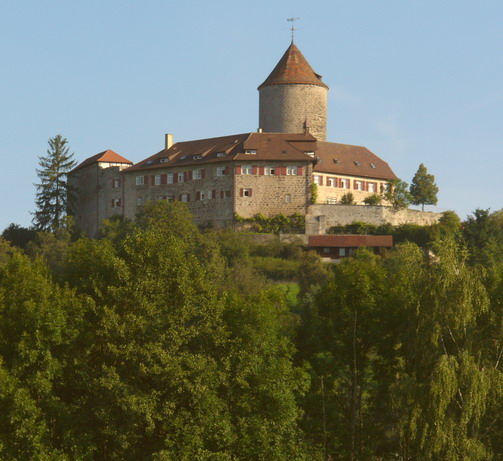
Burg Reichenberg right above the Murr valley

In Oppenweiler, the Murr passes the hamlet Ellenweiler on the left side and, approximately on a southwest course, the district Reichenberg, above which the Burg Reichenberg stands. Beyond the river lies the hamlet Reichenbach an der Murr at the foot of the left slope. After the village the Tierbach flows from the right. Between Reichenberg and the main town of Oppenweiler, an industrial area stretches along the right bank of the river until the Rohrbach meets the Murr from the right at the edge of its residential area; a short right branch of it feeds the castle pond around the Wasserschloss Oppenweiler close to the right bank of the river; a little downhill opposite is the hamlet Aichelbach of the community. In Oppenweiler, the B 14 now rises out of the Murr valley and turns away from it; the Kreisstraße K 1897 and the railroad line Schwäbisch Hall-Hessental-Waiblingen continue to run in it. The following hamlet of Zell lies on both banks, then the Murr passes over into the Backnang city area.

Here the valley narrows again, with heavily meandering meanders it ends its southern course between forest tongues which briefly reach close to the shore again and turns to the west-southwest, out of the mountainous region of the Swabian-Franconian Forest, which was previously divided by it, into the Neckar Basin. Their bed now lies in the harder rock of the Muschelkalk.

==== From the Buchenbach to the estuary ====
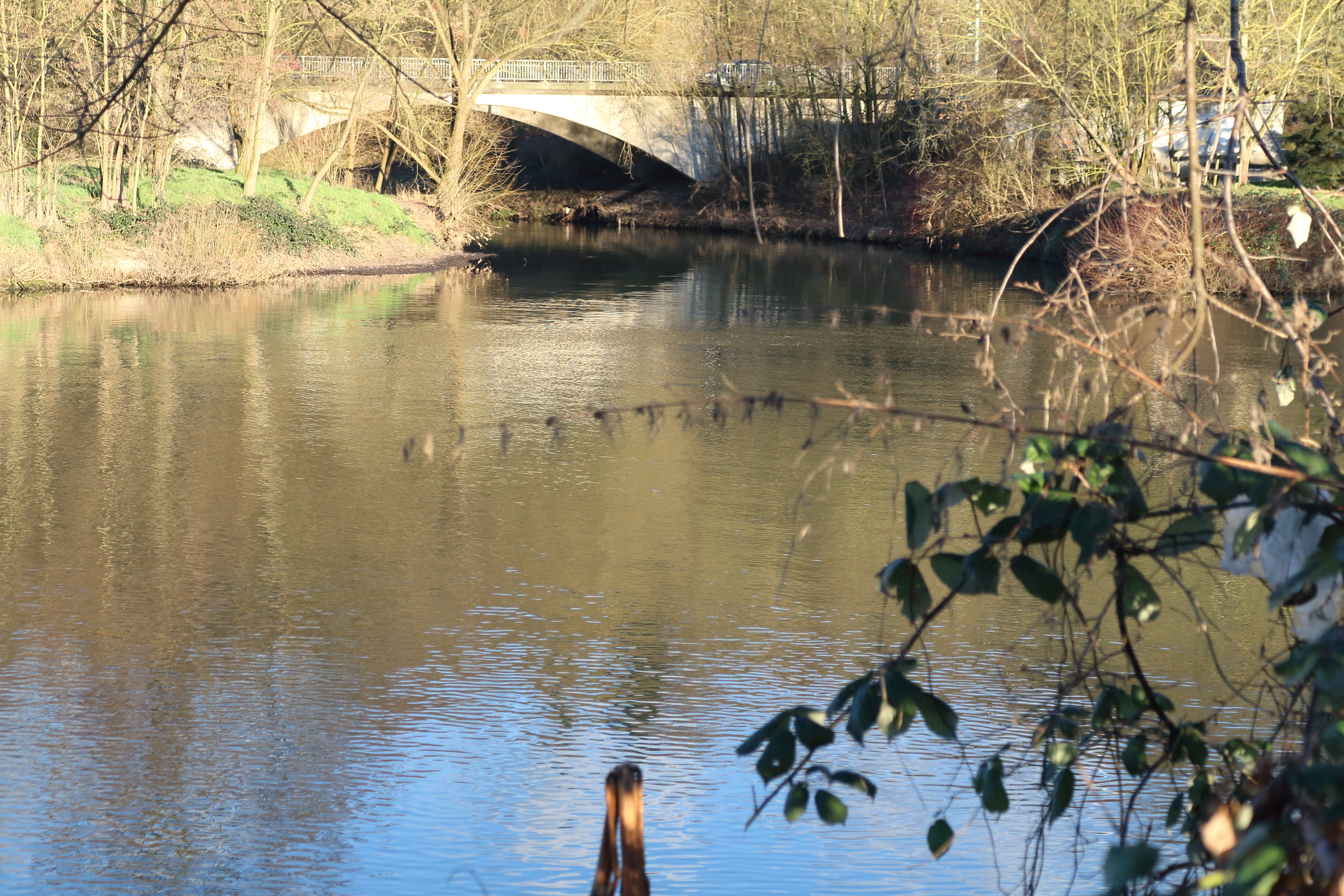
Confluence of the Murr into the Neckar (from right to left).

After a short stretch, on which Affalterbach is the left-hand neighbor, the river turns northwest to the area of Kirchberg an der Murr, which is on the right-hand side of the valley except for a mill estate and some newer commercial buildings. After this, the Eichbach, which is unsteady in its lower course, flows from the right through a long blade as well as the short Weidenbach. At the Kirchberg hamlet Rundsmühlhof on the valley floor the river leaves the Rems-Murr-Kreis, and briefly joins the area of Rielingshausen. (district and exclave of Marbach) on the right and Erdmannhausen on the left to the bank, over the so-called Schweißbrücke, the first of two state roads crosses the river here with the L 1124 Großaspach-Marbach at the deeply cut lower course, whose valley then enters a wide northern loop and the area of Steinheim an der Murr. Here it is reached immediately from the right by the Sulzbach, and again by a longer blade of the Otterbach, whereupon Steinheim reaches down from the slope to the right bank. Through this small town at the northernmost point of the lower course, the Bottwar flows towards something below 195.1 m from the right, which rises far in the north in the Löwenstein Hills. In the part of the loop running back to the south the Murr crosses the boundary of the municipality Murr. The village is situated on the right slope and is embraced by the L 1100 running south, which crosses the river at the eastern and southern edge of the municipal territory over bridges and then follows it a short distance to the left. The Murr runs its last kilometer southwards on the ground of the city Marbach am Neckar and flows there, after a last crossing by the L 1011, at 190.2 m and after a run of over 51 km from the right into the Neckar.

=== Tributaries ===
The longest tributary of the Murr is with 25 km the Buchenbach, which flows between Burgstetten and Kirchberg and the Murr supplies the outflow of the Berglen. Measured at the catchment area the Bottwar near Steinheim is with 76 km² the largest and with a run of 18 km the second longest inflow. Other tributaries with a length of ten or more kilometers are the "Spiegelberger" Lauter (15.2 km), the Wüstenbach (12.9 km) and the Klöpferbach (10.2 km), which all come from the Löwensteiner mountains to the Murr, as well as the Weißach (12 km), which is fed by numerous watercourses in the east of Backnang Bay. From the strongly dissected Murrhardter forest numerous smaller brooks flow to the Murr, of which the Hörschbach (Murr) might be the most well known because of its natural beauties.

Tributaries
| Name | Side of confluence | Length in km | Remaining length of the Murr at confluence in km |
|---|---|---|---|
| Fautsbach | right | 2.392 | 49.075 |
| Taubenbach | left | 2.289 | 48.334 |
| Gießbach | right | 2.767 | 48.239 |
| Köchersbächle | left | 1.719 | 47.175 |
| Klettenbach | right | 2.101 | 46.923 |
| unnamed | left | 1.101 | 46.357 |
| Otterbach | right | 5.669 | 44.464 |
| Fornsbach | right | 8.296 | 43.623 |
| Neu Fornsbach | right | 0.367 | 43.440 |
| Raitklinge | left | 1.012 | 43.204 |
| Kölschklingenbach | left | 0.876 | 42.993 |
| Grundbach | left | 0.743 | 42.323 |
| Fehlbach | right | 1.919 | 41.584 |
| Großkehlbach | left | 3.287 | 39.620 |
| Trauzenbach | right | 7.953 | 39.354 |
| unnamed | left | 0.842 | 38.607 |
| Hörschbach | left | 5.452 | 37.933 |
| Harbach | right | 6.354 | 37.112 |
| Eschelbach | right | 3.967 | 35.928 |
| Haselbach | left | 6.742 | 34.918 |
| Gronbach | right | 1.319 | 33.884 |
| Fischbach | right | 8.33 | 32.828 |
| Seebach | left | 1.04 | 32.558 |
| Reizenbach | left | 1.06 | 32.218 |
| Lauter | right | 15.546 | 31.851 |
| Rosstalbach | right | 1.328 | 30.784 |
| Reichenbach | left | 2.039 | 29.948 |
| Tierbach | right | 3.045 | 29.554 |
| Rohrbach | right | 4.198 | 29.067 |
| Froschbach | right | 1.556 | 28.535 |
| Eichelbach | left | 3.893 | 28.137 |
| Dinkelbach | right | 0.903 | 27.204 |
| Büffenbach | left | 1.359 | 27.031 |
| Fraunklingenbach | left | 2.647 | 26.964 |
| Kreuzhaubach | right | 1.308 | 26.579 |
| Schreppenbach | left | 2.608 | 25.656 |
| Bodenbach | left | 1.837 | 25.427 |
| Weißach (Murr) | left | 12.262 | 23.316 |
| Eckertsbach | right | 6.215 | 21.998 |
| Krähenbach | right | 4.997 | 19.775 |
| Maubach | left | 5.59 | 18.348 |
| Klöpferbach | right | 10.293 | 17.432 |
| Wüstenbach | right | 13.031 | 15.818 |
| Söllbach | left | 3.091 | 15.207 |
| Buchenbach | left | 24.013 | 12.686 |
| Eichbach | right | 4.135 | 8.865 |
| Weidenach | right | 2.182 | 8.134 |
| Sulzbach | right | 2.695 | 5.278 |
| Otterbach | right | 6.557 | 4.838 |
| Bottwar | right | 18.331 | 2.971 |
