= Weissach (disambiguation) =

Weissach is a municipality in the district of Böblingen in Baden-Württemberg in Germany.

Weissach or Weißach may also refer to:

== Places in Europe ==
- Weissach im Tal, a municipality in the Rems-Murr-Kreis district of Baden-Württemberg, Germany
- Weißach (Bregenzer Ach), a river in the German and Austrian Alps, tributary of the Bregenzer Ach
- Weißach (Tegernsee), a river of Bavaria, Germany, tributary of the Tegernsee
- Weißach (Murr), a river of Baden-Württemberg, Germany, tributary of the Murr
- Weißach (Saalbach), a river of Baden-Württemberg, Germany, headstream of the Saalbach
- Weissach, a quarter of the town Kufstein, Austria

== Related to Porsche ==
- Weissach axle, a special rear suspension arrangement devised for the Porsche 928
- Weissach Package, an upgrade option available for the Porsche 918 Spyder and other models
