= Ralf Nentwich =

German politician (born 1982)

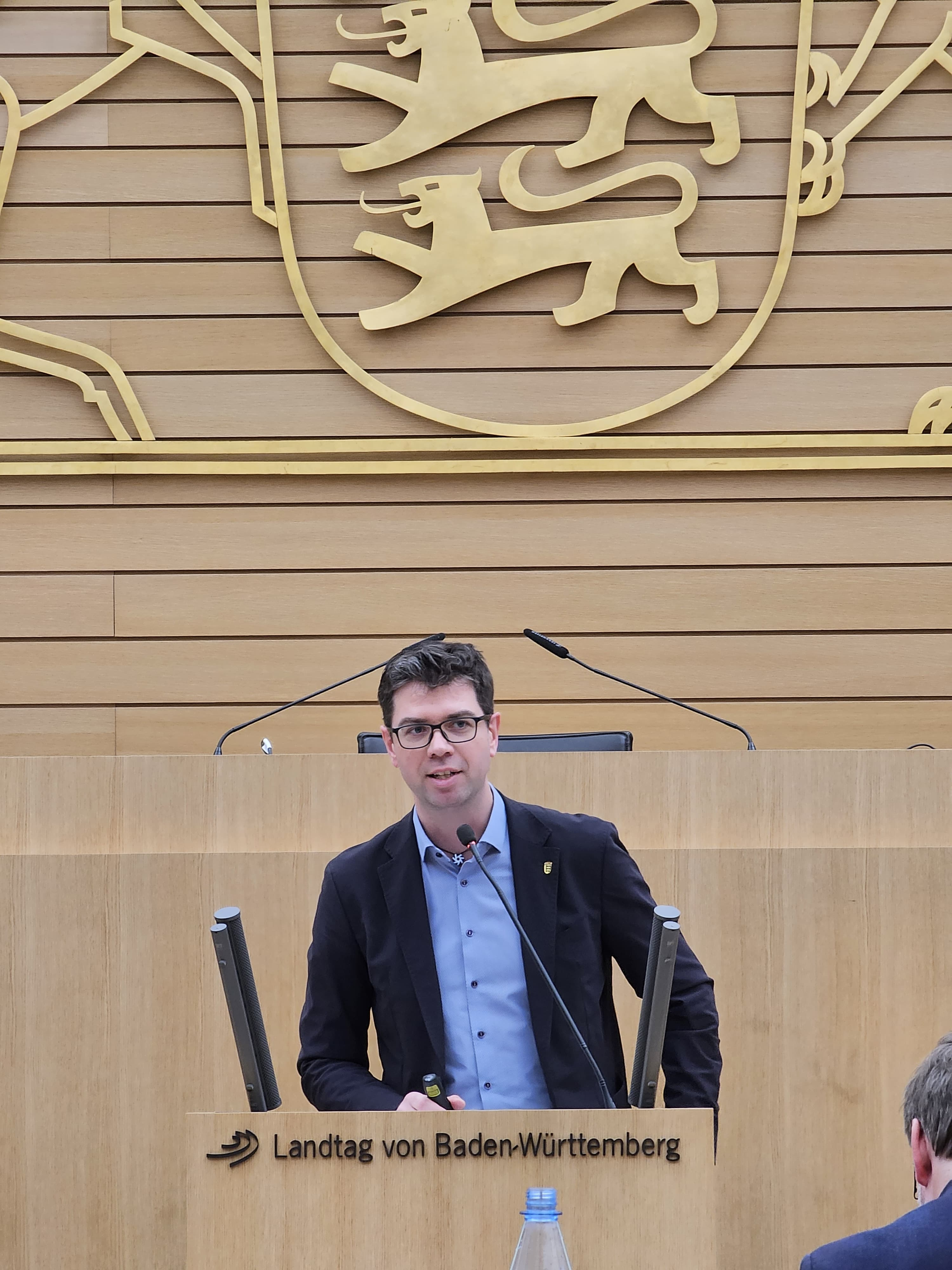
- Nentwich in 2024

Member of the Landtag of Baden-Württemberg
- Incumbent
- Assumed office 14 April 2021
- Constituency: Backnang

Personal details
- Born: 30 January 1982 (age 44) Backnang
- Party: Alliance 90/The Greens

Ralf Nentwich (born 30 January 1982 in Backnang) is a German politician serving as a member of the Landtag of Baden-Württemberg since 2021. He has been a city councillor of Murrhardt since 2019.
