= Trauzenbach =

River in Germany

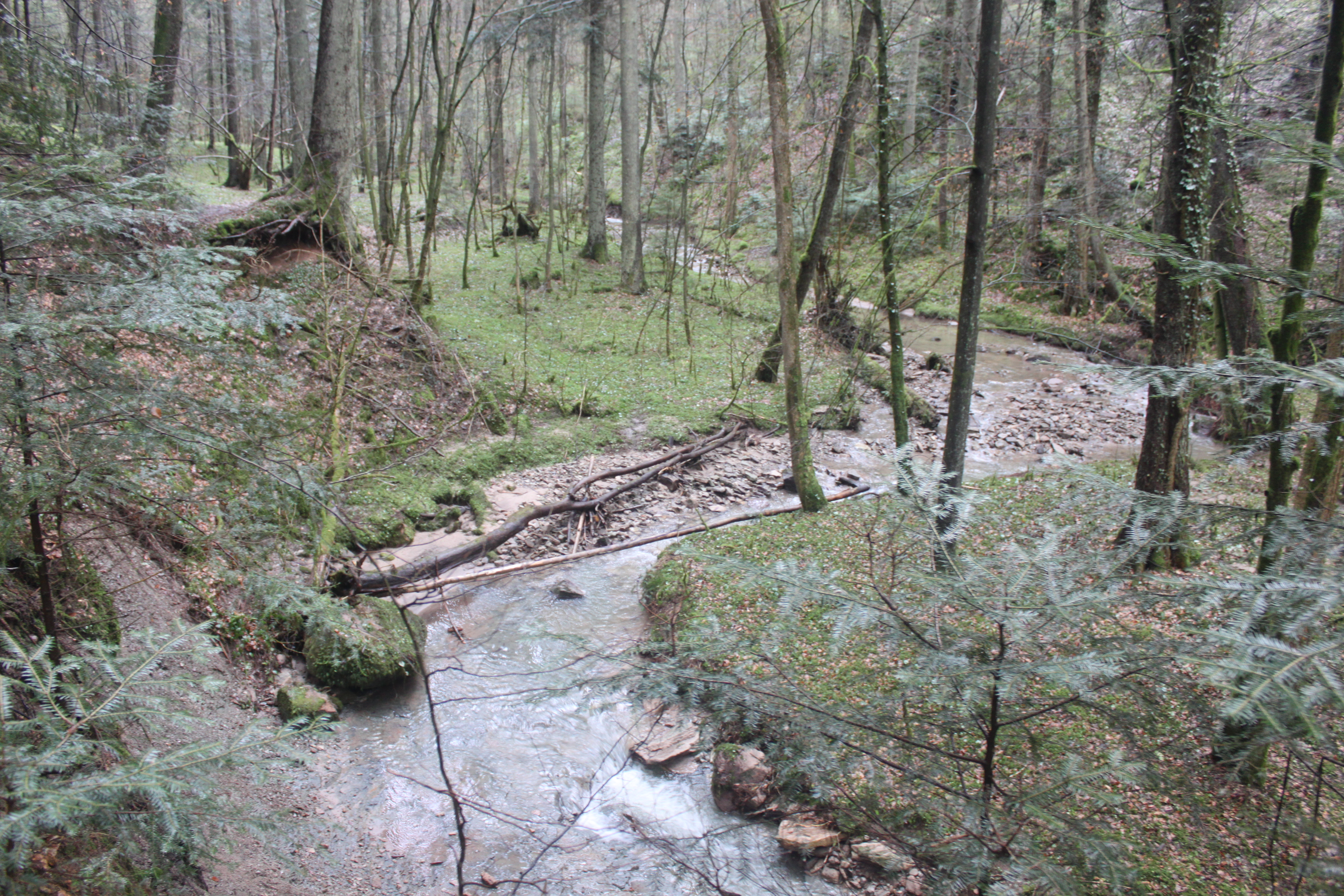
- The Trauzenbach1

Location
- Country: Germany
- State: Baden-Württemberg

Physical characteristics
- Mouth
  - location: Murr
  - coordinates: 48.9810°N 9.5788°E
- Length: 8.0 km (5.0 mi)

Basin features
- Progression: Murr→ Neckar→ Rhine→ North Sea

Trauzenbach (in its lower course: Dentelbach) is a river of Baden-Württemberg, Germany. It flows into the Murr in Murrhardt.

== See also ==
- List of rivers of Baden-Württemberg
