= Buchenbach (Murr) =

River in Germany

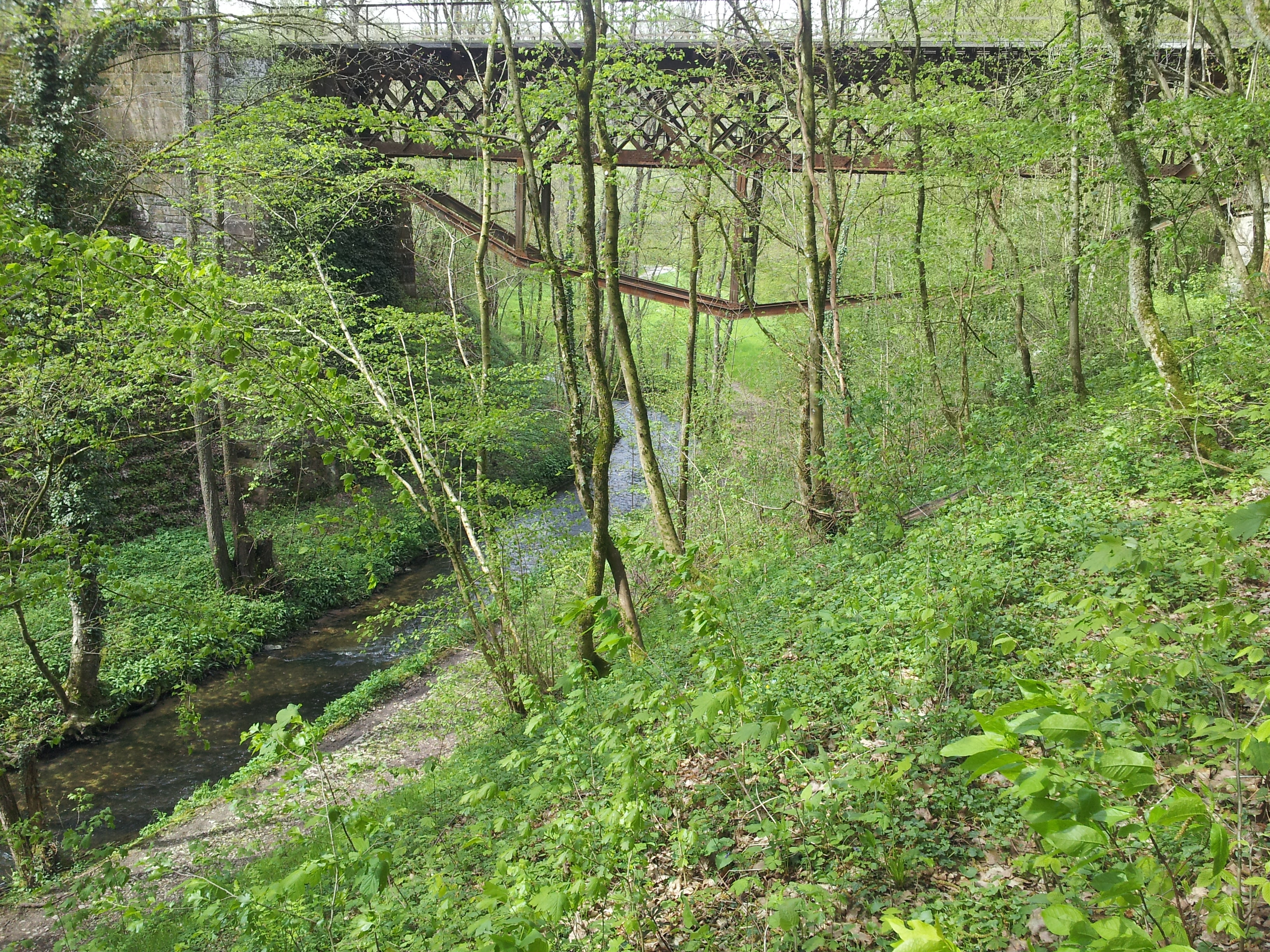
- The Buchenbach beneath the railroad bridge at the municipal boundary between Burgstetten and Affalterbach (the bridge was replaced by a new structure in 2018)

Location
- Country: Germany
- State: Baden-Württemberg

Physical characteristics
- Mouth
  - location: Murr
  - coordinates: 48.9333°N 9.3517°E
- Length: 24.0 km (14.9 mi)

Basin features
- Progression: Murr→ Neckar→ Rhine→ North Sea

The Buchenbach is a river in Baden-Württemberg, Germany. It passes through Winnenden and flows into the Murr near Burgstetten.

== See also ==
- List of rivers of Baden-Württemberg
