= Tierbach (Murr) =

River in Germany

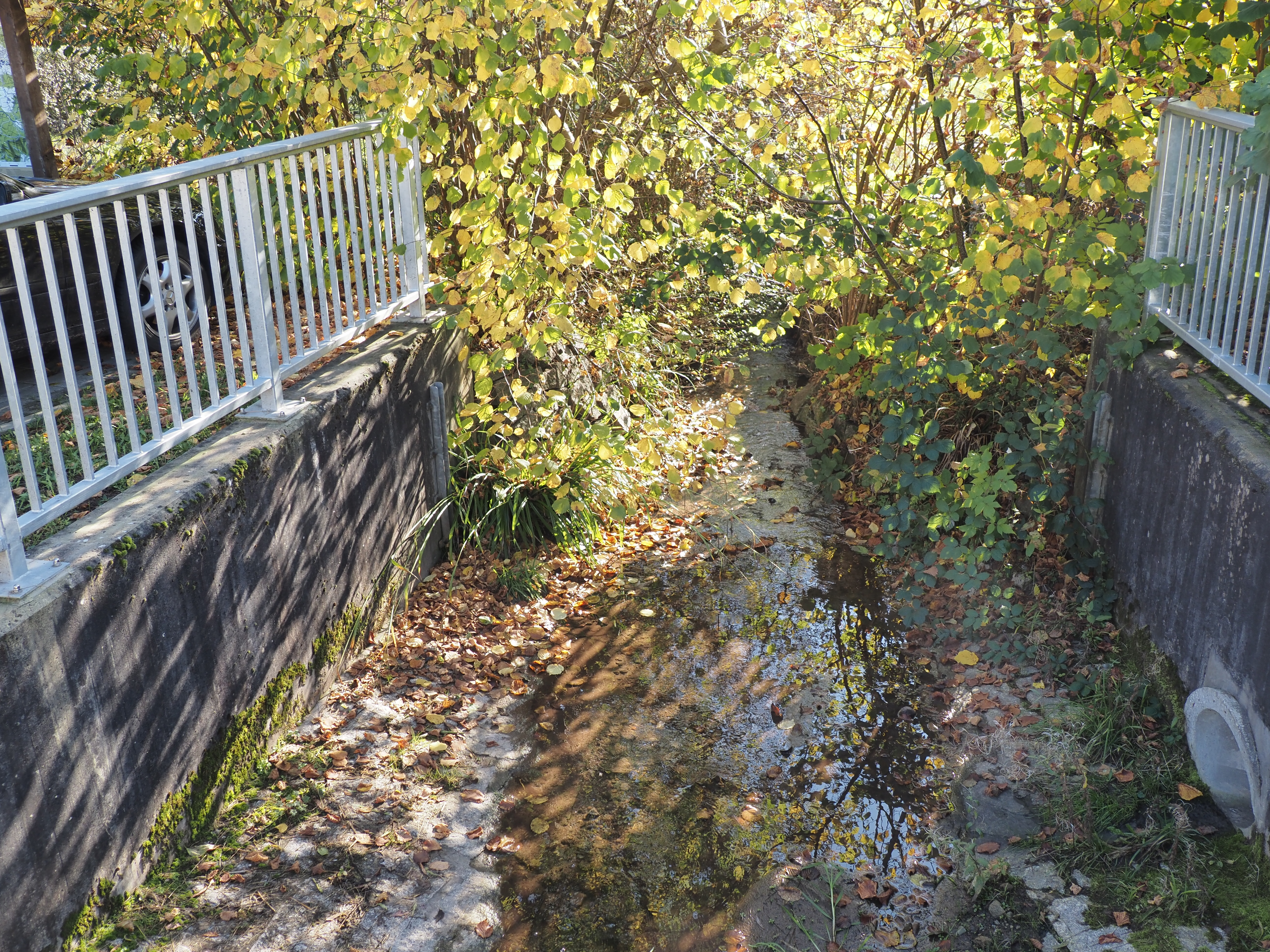

Location
- Country: Germany
- State: Baden-Württemberg

Physical characteristics
- Mouth
  - location: Murr
  - coordinates: 48.9872°N 9.4653°E

Basin features
- Progression: Murr→ Neckar→ Rhine→ North Sea

Tierbach is a river of Baden-Württemberg, Germany. It is a right tributary of the Murr in Oppenweiler.

== See also ==
- List of rivers of Baden-Württemberg
