= Weißach (Murr) =

River in Baden-Württemberg, Germany

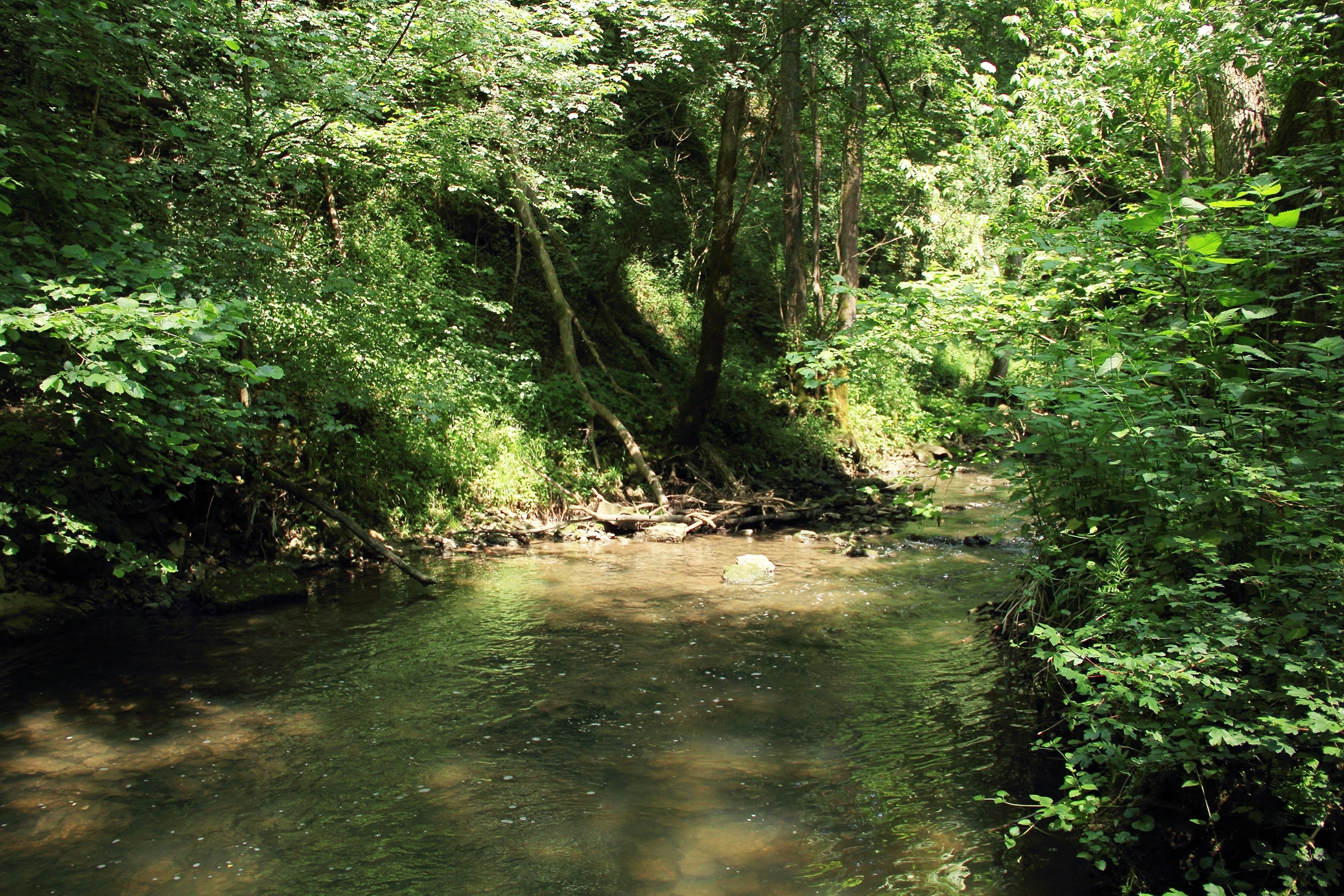

Location
- Country: Germany
- State: Baden-Württemberg

Physical characteristics
- Mouth
  - location: Murr
  - coordinates: 48.9483°N 9.4461°E
- Length: 12.3 km (7.6 mi)

Basin features
- Progression: Murr→ Neckar→ Rhine→ North Sea

Weißach is a river of Baden-Württemberg, Germany. It passes through Weissach im Tal and flows into the Murr near Backnang.

== See also ==
- List of rivers of Baden-Württemberg
