= Wüstenbach =

River in Germany

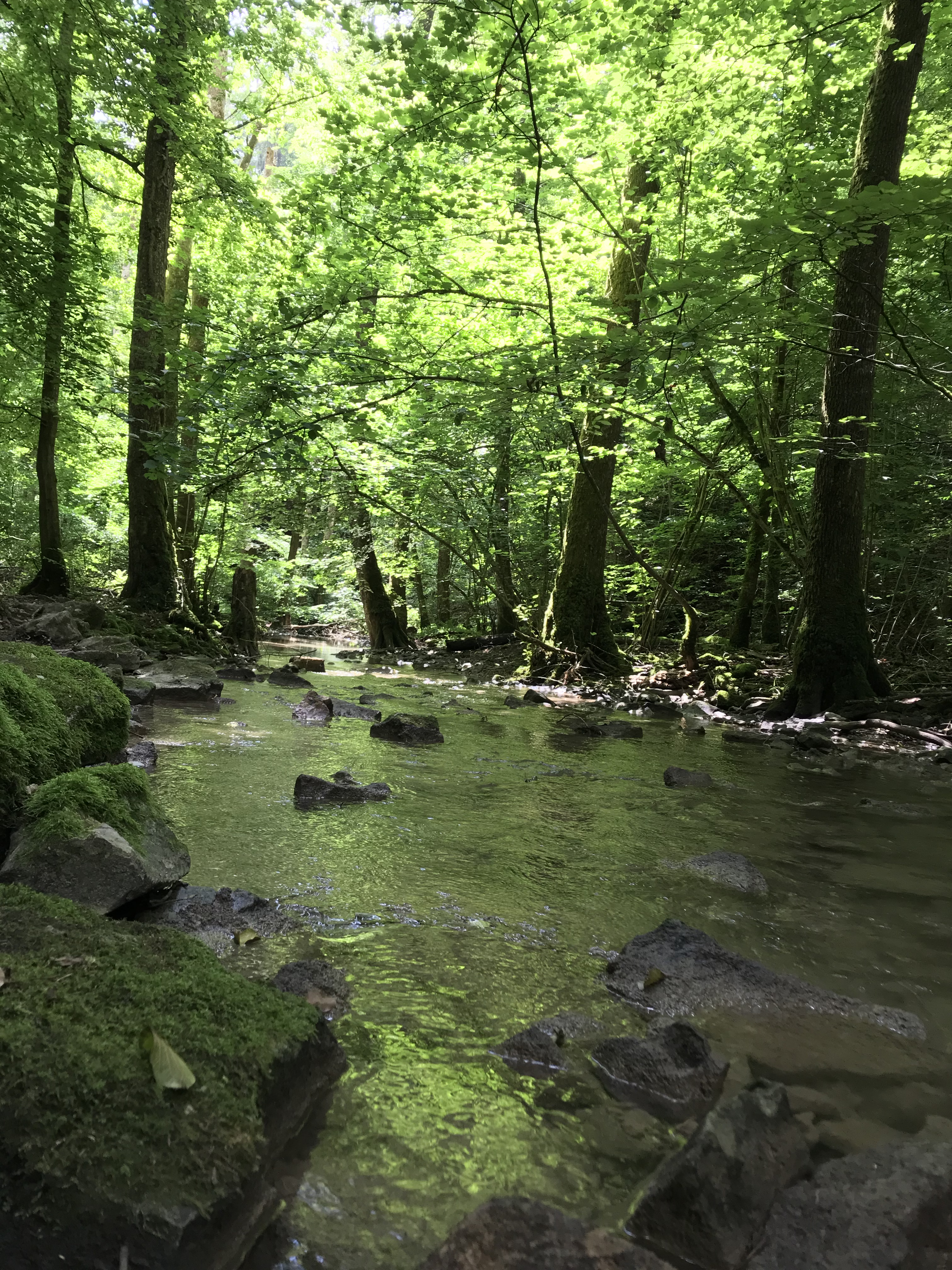

Location
- Country: Germany
- State: Baden-Württemberg

Physical characteristics
- Mouth
  - location: Murr
  - coordinates: 48.9358°N 9.3834°E
- Length: 13.0 km (8.1 mi)

Basin features
- Progression: Murr→ Neckar→ Rhine→ North Sea

Wüstenbach is a river of Baden-Württemberg, Germany. It flows into the Murr near Burgstetten.

== See also ==
- List of rivers of Baden-Württemberg
