= Juxkopf =

Mountain in Baden-Württemberg, Germany

Coordinates: 49°02′N 9°26′E

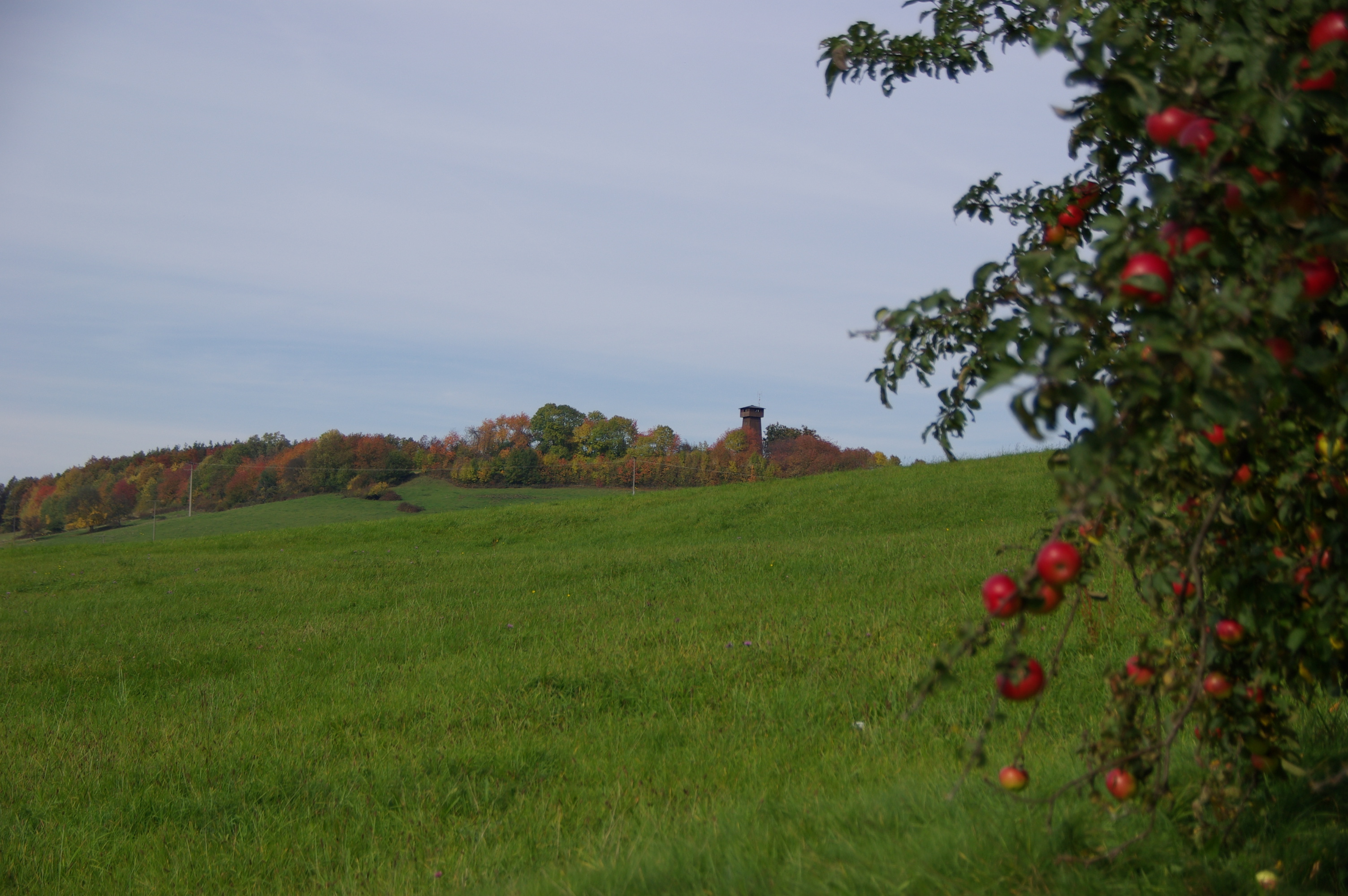

Geography
- Location: Baden-Württemberg, Germany

Juxkopf (German pronunciation: [ˈjʊksˌkɔp͡f]) is a mountain of Baden-Württemberg, Germany.
