= Bottwar =

River in Germany

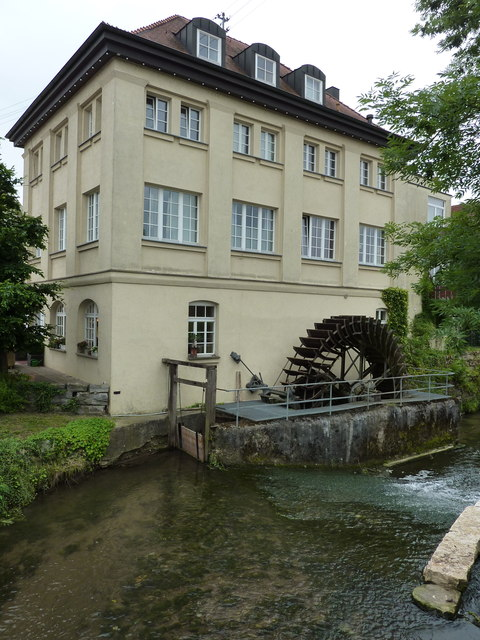
- Mill at the Bottwar in Steinheim an der Murr

Location
- Country: Germany
- State: Baden-Württemberg

Physical characteristics
- Mouth
  - location: Murr
  - coordinates: 48.9642°N 9.2701°E
- Length: 18.3 km (11.4 mi)

Basin features
- Progression: Murr→ Neckar→ Rhine→ North Sea

The Bottwar (German pronunciation: [ˈbɔtvaʁ]) is a river in Baden-Württemberg, Germany. It passes through Großbottwar and flows into the Murr in Steinheim an der Murr.

== See also ==
- List of rivers of Baden-Württemberg
