= Klöpferbach =

River in Germany

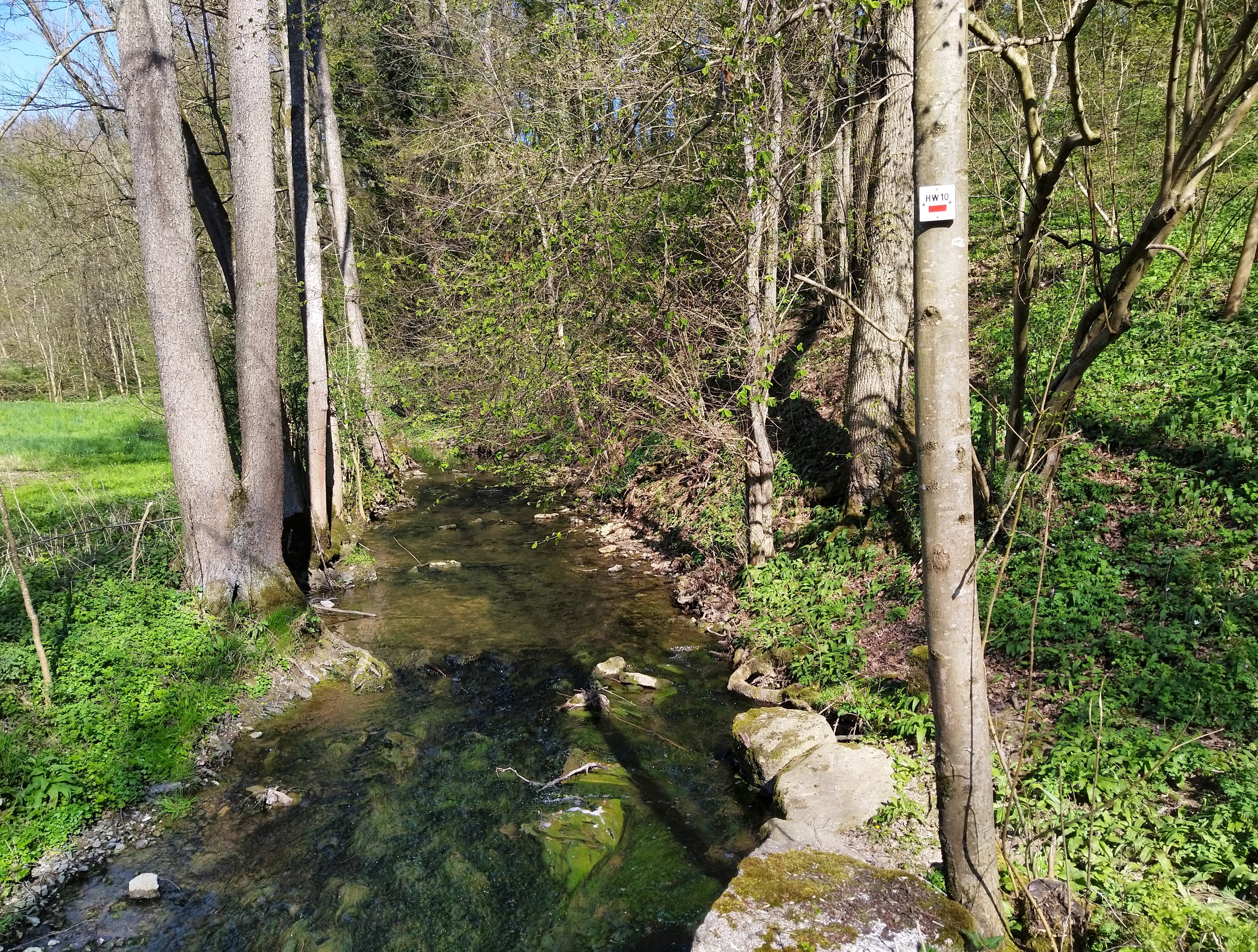

Location
- Country: Germany
- State: Baden-Württemberg

Physical characteristics
- Mouth
  - location: Neckar
  - coordinates: 48.9382°N 9.3958°E
- Length: 10.3 km (6.4 mi)

Basin features
- Progression: Murr→ Neckar→ Rhine→ North Sea

Klöpferbach is a river of Baden-Württemberg, Germany. It passes through Aspach and flows into the Murr near Backnang.

== See also ==
- List of rivers of Baden-Württemberg
