= Auenwald =

- Municipality
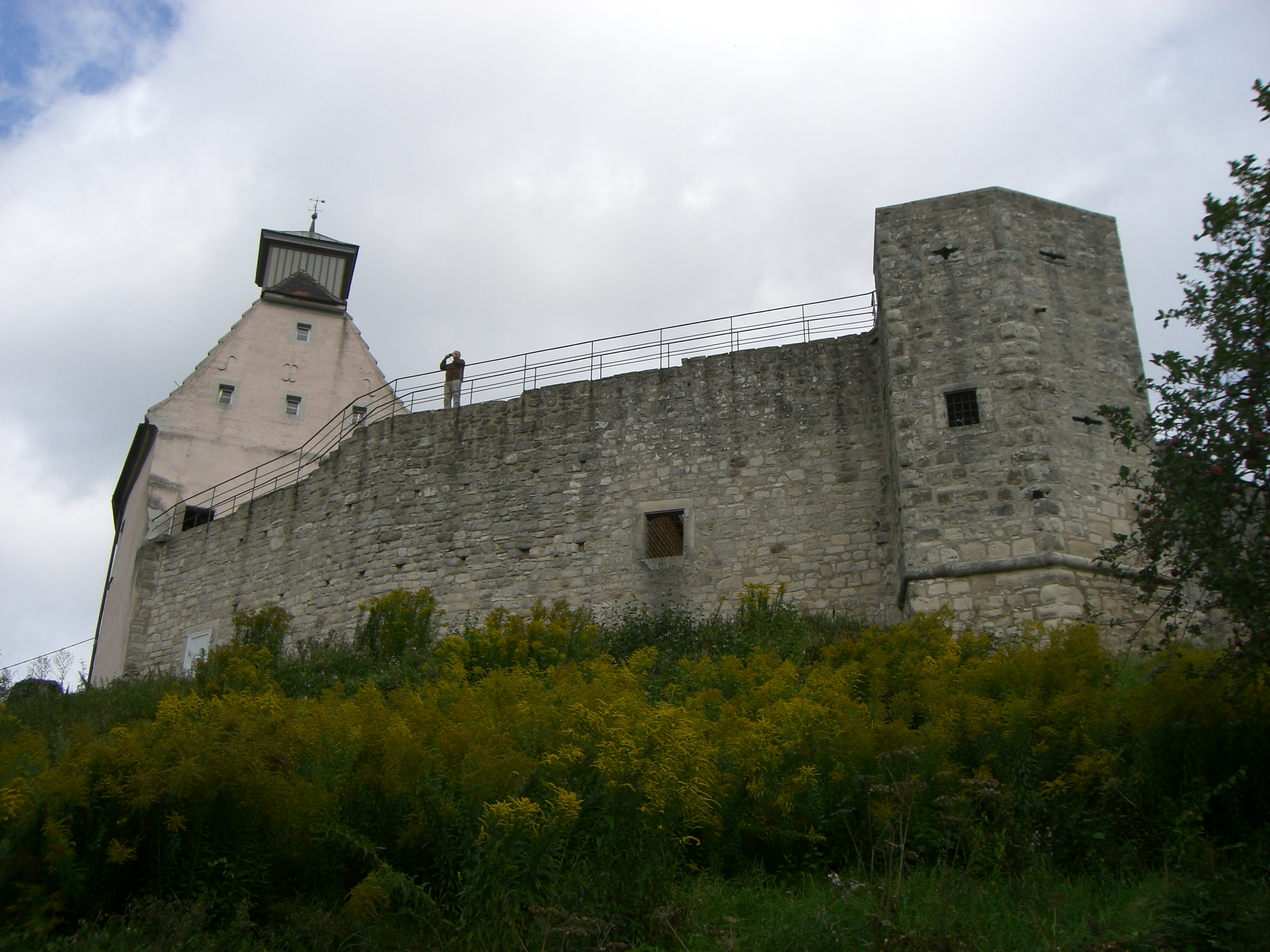
- Ebersberg Castle

- Coat of arms

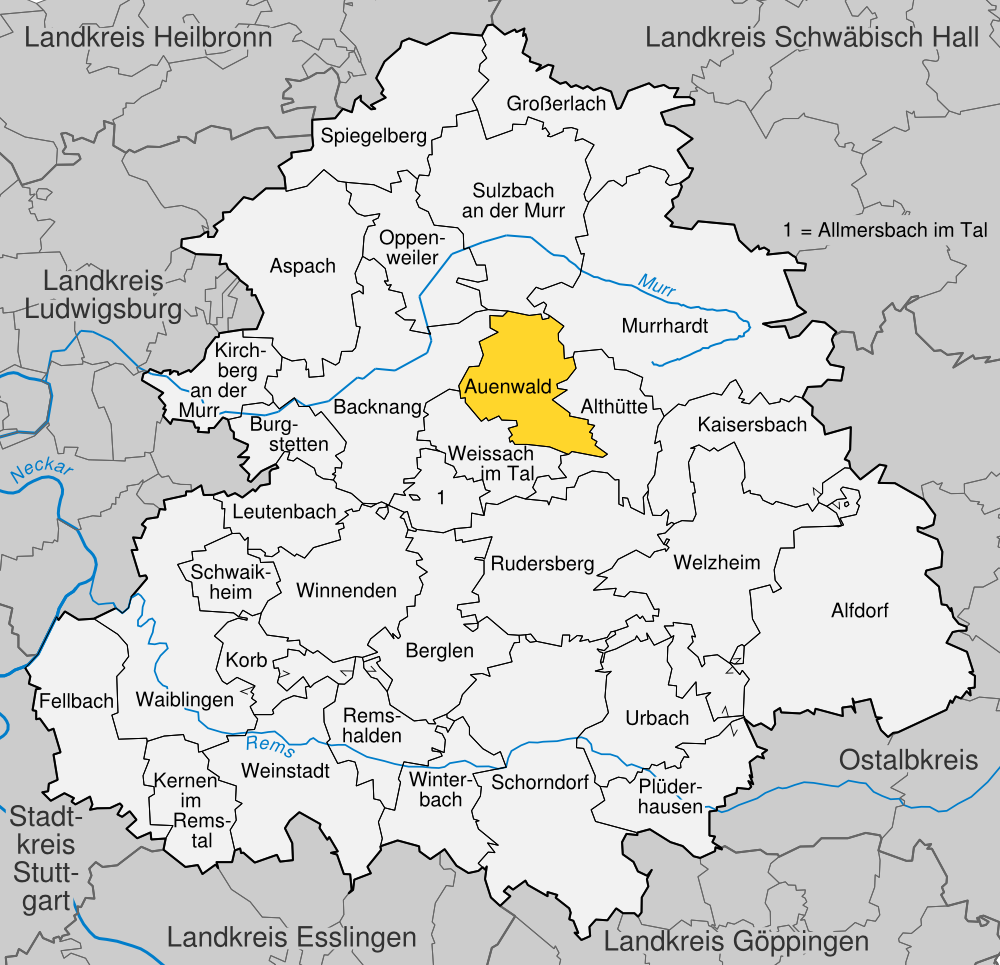
- Location of Auenwald within Rems-Murr-Kreis district
- Interactive map of Auenwald
- Location within Germany Location within Baden-Württemberg
- Coordinates: 48°56′13″N 09°30′03″E
- Country: Germany
- State: Baden-Württemberg
- Admin. region: Stuttgart
- District: Rems-Murr-Kreis

Government
  - Mayor (2021–29): Kai-Uwe Ernst

Area
  - Total: 19.76 km^{2} (7.63 sq mi)
- Elevation: 280 m (920 ft)

Population (2025-12-31)
  - Total: 6,806
  - Density: 344.4/km^{2} (892.1/sq mi)
- Time zone: UTC+01:00 (CET)
  - Summer (DST): UTC+02:00 (CEST)
- Postal codes: 71549
- Dialling codes: 07191
- Vehicle registration: WN
- Website: www.auenwald.de

Auenwald is a municipality in the district of Rems-Murr in Baden-Württemberg in Germany.

== Twin town ==
The twin town of Auenwald is:

- Beaurepaire, Isère, France, since 1987
