= Rems-Murr-Kreis =

District in Germany

Coordinates: 48°55′N 9°32′E

- District
- Flag Coat of arms
- Country: Germany
- State: Baden-Württemberg
- Adm. region: Stuttgart
- Capital: Waiblingen

Government
  - District admin.: Richard Sigel

Area
  - Total: 858.14 km^{2} (331.33 sq mi)

Population (31 December 2024)
  - Total: 440,696
  - Density: 513.55/km^{2} (1,330.1/sq mi)
- Time zone: UTC+01:00 (CET)
  - Summer (DST): UTC+02:00 (CEST)
- Vehicle registration: WN, BK
- Website: www.rems-murr-kreis.de

Rems-Murr is a Landkreis (district) in the middle of Baden-Württemberg, Germany. Neighboring districts are (from north clockwise) Heilbronn, Schwäbisch Hall, Ostalbkreis, Göppingen, Esslingen, the district-free city Stuttgart and the district Ludwigsburg.

== History ==
The district was created in 1973 when Waiblingen was merged with most of the Backnang district and a few municipalities from the district Schwäbisch Gmünd.

== Geography ==
The largest part of the district is located in the Swabian-Franconian Forest (Schwäbisch-Fränkischer Wald), of which the Mainhardt Forest forms a part. The two rivers Rems and Murr gave the district its name.

== Coat of arms ==
The coat of arms shows a deer antler in the middle, the symbol of the former state of Württemberg. The two wavy blue lines above and below symbolize the rivers Murr (in the north) and Rems (in the south) after which the district was named.

== Twinning ==
Rems-Murr-Kreis is twinned with:

- Meissen (district), Germany, (since 1990)
- Baranya County, Hungary, (since 1991)
- Dmitrov, Russia, (since 2002)

== Cities and towns ==
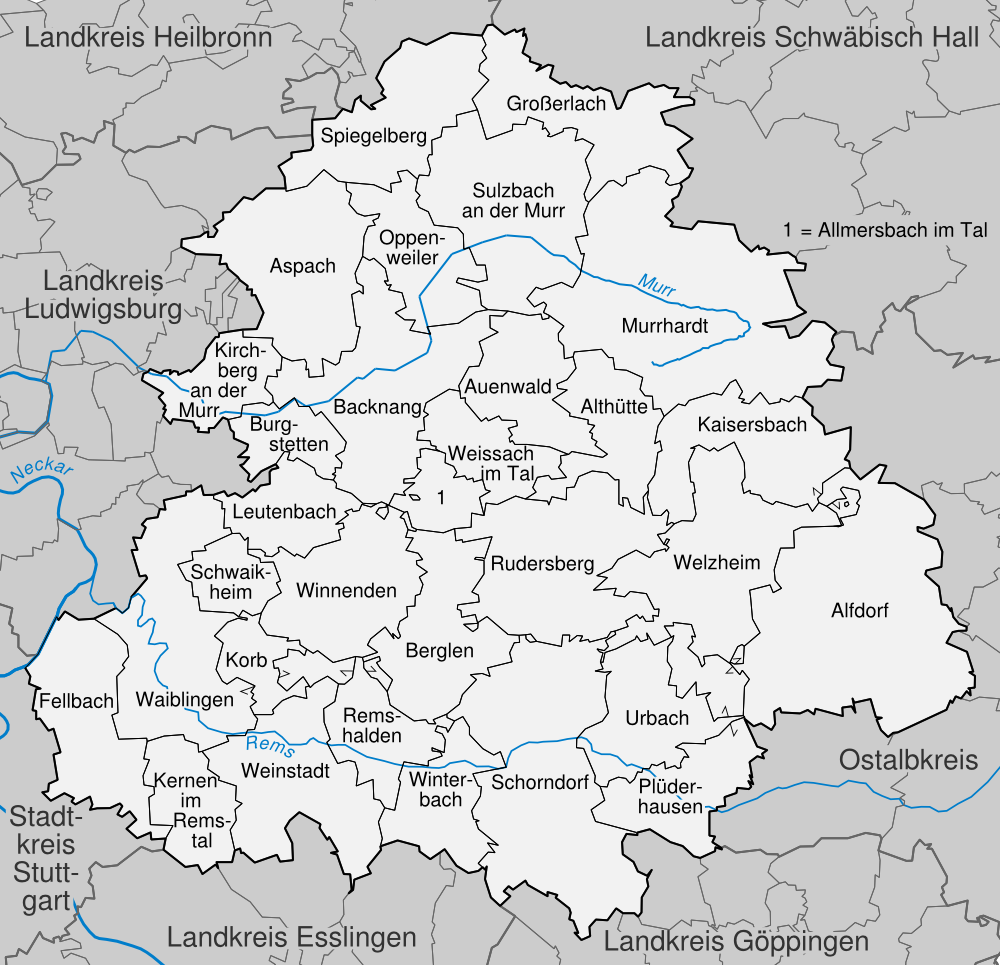
Clickable map of towns and municipalities in the district

Cities
1. Backnang
2. Fellbach
3. Murrhardt
4. Schorndorf
5. Waiblingen
6. Weinstadt
7. Welzheim
8. Winnenden
Administrative districts
1. Backnang
2. Plüderhausen-Urbach
3. Schorndorf
4. Sulzbach
5. Welzheim
6. Winnenden
Towns
1. Alfdorf
2. Allmersbach im Tal
3. Althütte
4. Aspach
5. Auenwald
6. Berglen
7. Burgstetten
8. Großerlach
9. Kaisersbach
10. Kernen
11. Kirchberg an der Murr
12. Korb

13. Leutenbach
14. Oppenweiler
15. Plüderhausen
16. Remshalden
17. Rudersberg
18. Schwaikheim
19. Spiegelberg
20. Sulzbach an der Murr
21. Urbach
22. Weissach im Tal
23. Winterbach
