= Kirchberg an der Murr =

- Municipality
- Coat of arms

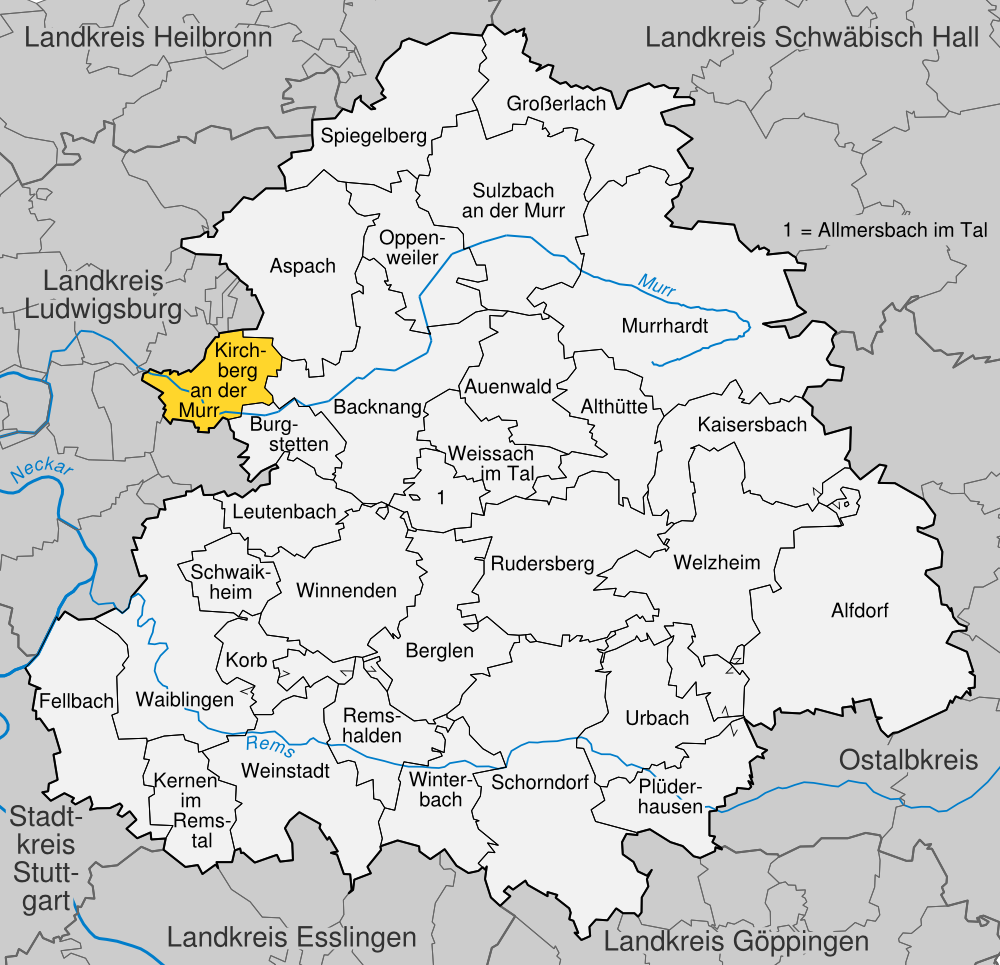
- Location of Kirchberg an der Murr within Rems-Murr-Kreis district
- Interactive map of Kirchberg an der Murr
- Location within Germany Location within Baden-Württemberg
- Coordinates: 48°56′34″N 09°20′26″E
- Country: Germany
- State: Baden-Württemberg
- Admin. region: Stuttgart
- District: Rems-Murr-Kreis

Government
  - Mayor (2018–26): Frank Hornek

Area
  - Total: 13.21 km^{2} (5.10 sq mi)
- Elevation: 306 m (1,004 ft)

Population (2025-12-31)
  - Total: 4,062
  - Density: 307.5/km^{2} (796.4/sq mi)
- Time zone: UTC+01:00 (CET)
  - Summer (DST): UTC+02:00 (CEST)
- Postal codes: 71736–71737
- Dialling codes: 07144
- Vehicle registration: WN
- Website: www.kirchberg-murr.de

Kirchberg an der Murr (German pronunciation: [ˈkɪʁçbɛʁk ʔan deːɐ̯ ˈmʊʁ], lit. 'Kirchberg on the Murr') is a municipality in the district of Rems-Murr in Baden-Württemberg in Germany.

== Demographics ==
Population development:

Year	Inhabitants
1990	3,399
2001	3,618
2011	3,599
2021	3,938
