= Murrhardt =

- Town
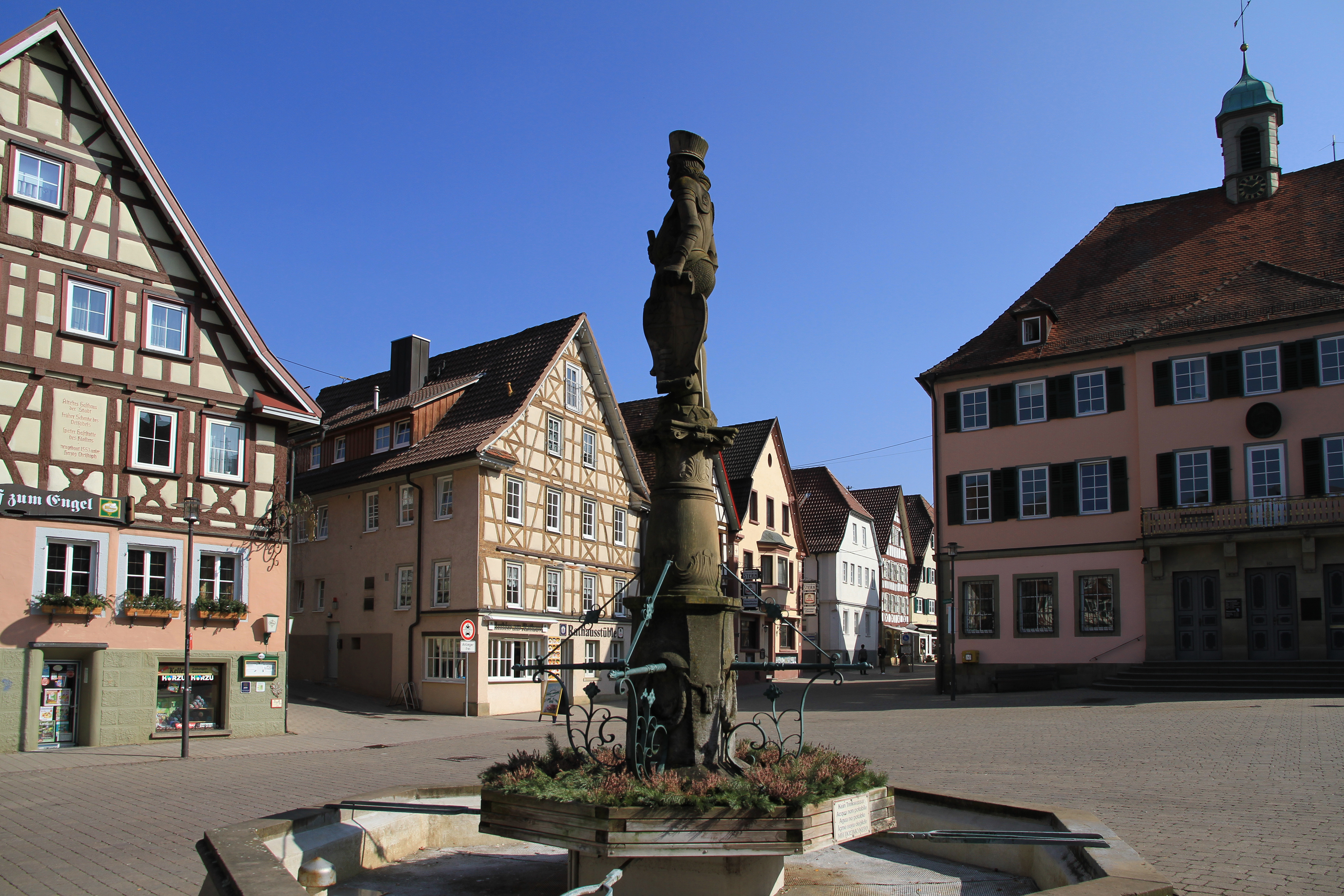
- Murrhardt market place

- Flag Coat of arms

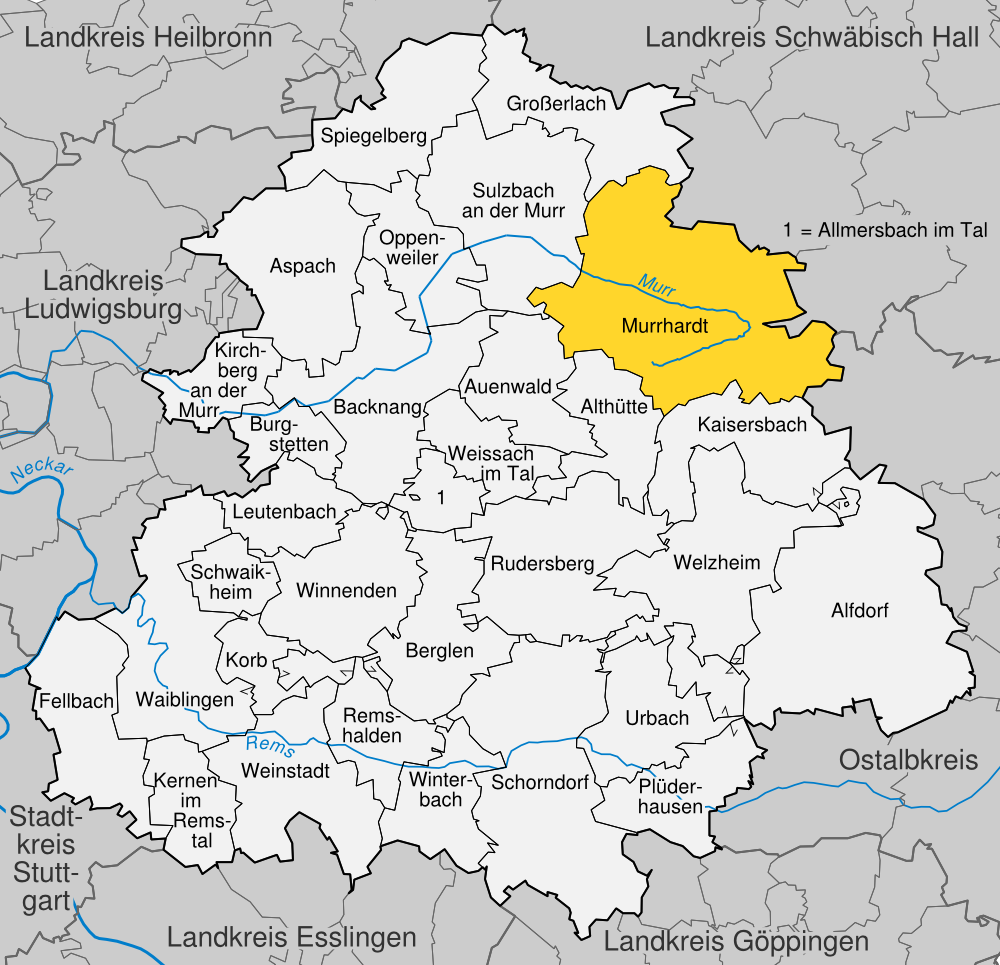
- Location of Murrhardt within Rems-Murr-Kreis district
- Interactive map of Murrhardt
- Location within Germany Location within Baden-Württemberg
- Coordinates: 48°58′48″N 09°34′53″E
- Country: Germany
- State: Baden-Württemberg
- Admin. region: Stuttgart
- District: Rems-Murr-Kreis
- Subdivisions: 3 Stadtbezirke

Government
  - Mayor (2019–27): Armin Mößner

Area
  - Total: 71.15 km^{2} (27.47 sq mi)
- Elevation: 291 m (955 ft)

Population (2025-12-31)
  - Total: 14,490
  - Density: 203.7/km^{2} (527.5/sq mi)
- Time zone: UTC+01:00 (CET)
  - Summer (DST): UTC+02:00 (CEST)
- Postal codes: 71540
- Dialling codes: 07192 (07184 in the City District of Kirchenkirnberg)
- Vehicle registration: WN, BK
- Website: www.murrhardt.de

Murrhardt (German pronunciation: [ˈmʊʁhaʁt]) is a town in the Rems-Murr district, in Baden-Württemberg, Germany. It is located 12 km east of Backnang, and 18 km southwest of Schwäbisch Hall. The source of the Murr is situated in Murrhardt.

== Local council (Gemeinderat) ==
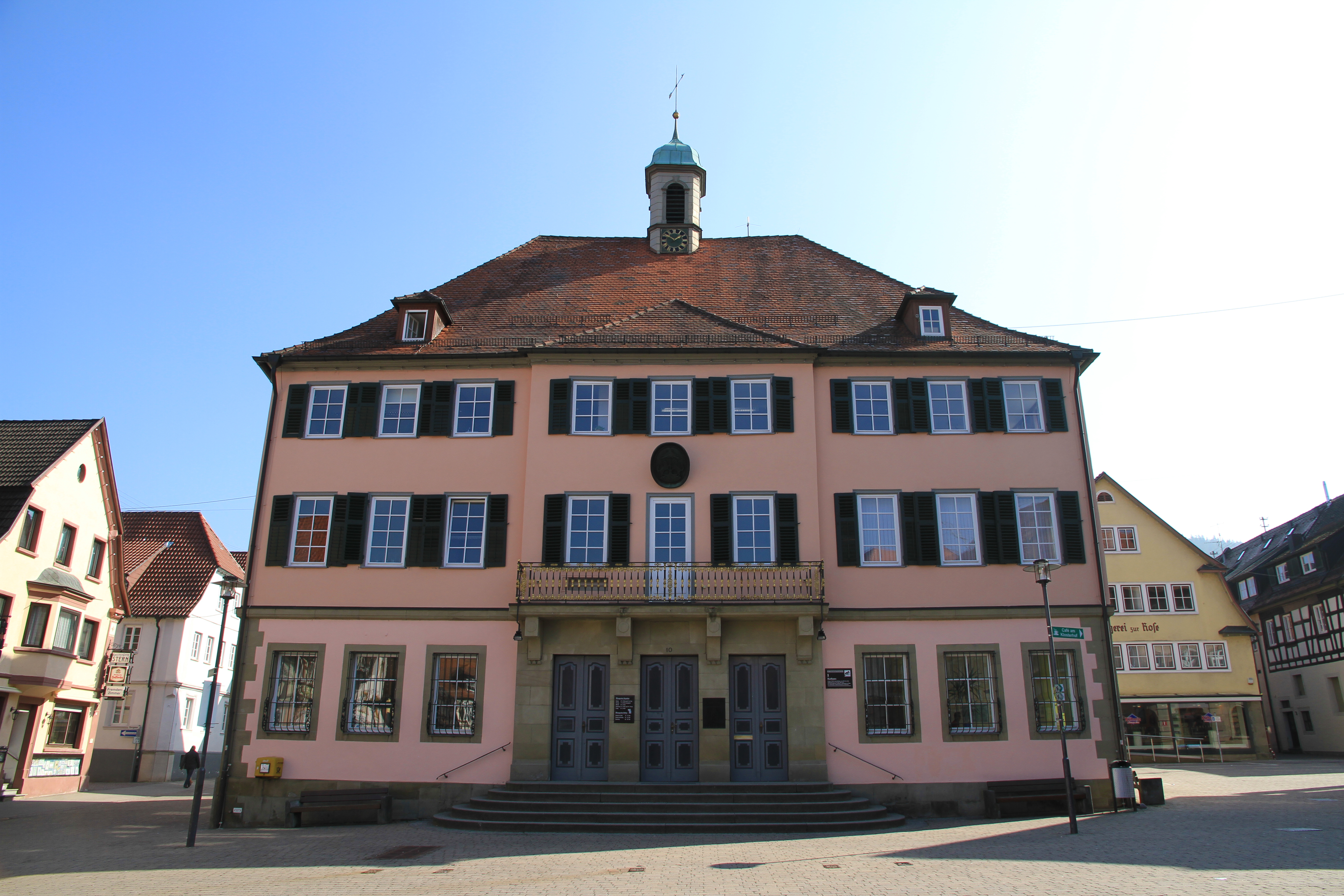
Murrhardt Town hall

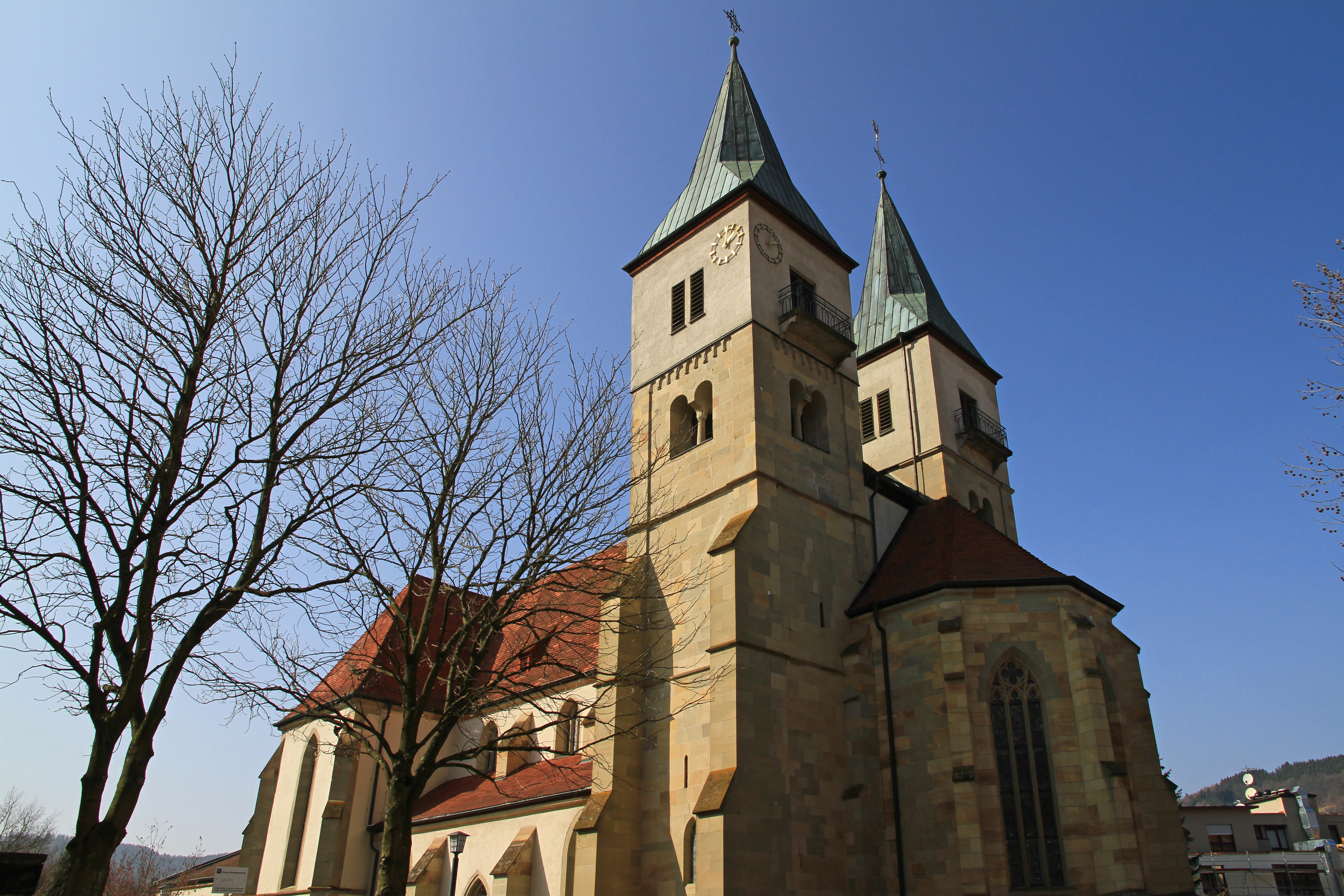
Church in Murrhardt

Elections were held in May 2014:

- Christian Democratic Union of Germany / Free Electoral Union: 32.64% = 6 seats
- Social Democratic Party of Germany: 23.77% = 4 seats
- UL Independent list: 23.43% = 4 seats
- MD/AL-Murrhardt Democrats / Alternative List: 20,17 % = 4 seats

== Mayor ==
Armin Mößner (CDU) was elected in July 2011 with 66,42 % of the vote. His predecessor was Dr. Gerhard Strobel.

== Twin town ==
Murrhardt has been twinned with Frome, England since 1983.

== Sons and daughters of the town ==
- Heinrich von Zügel (1850-1941), painter
- Michael Sladek (1946–2024), ecologist
