= Weissach im Tal =

- Municipality
- Coat of arms

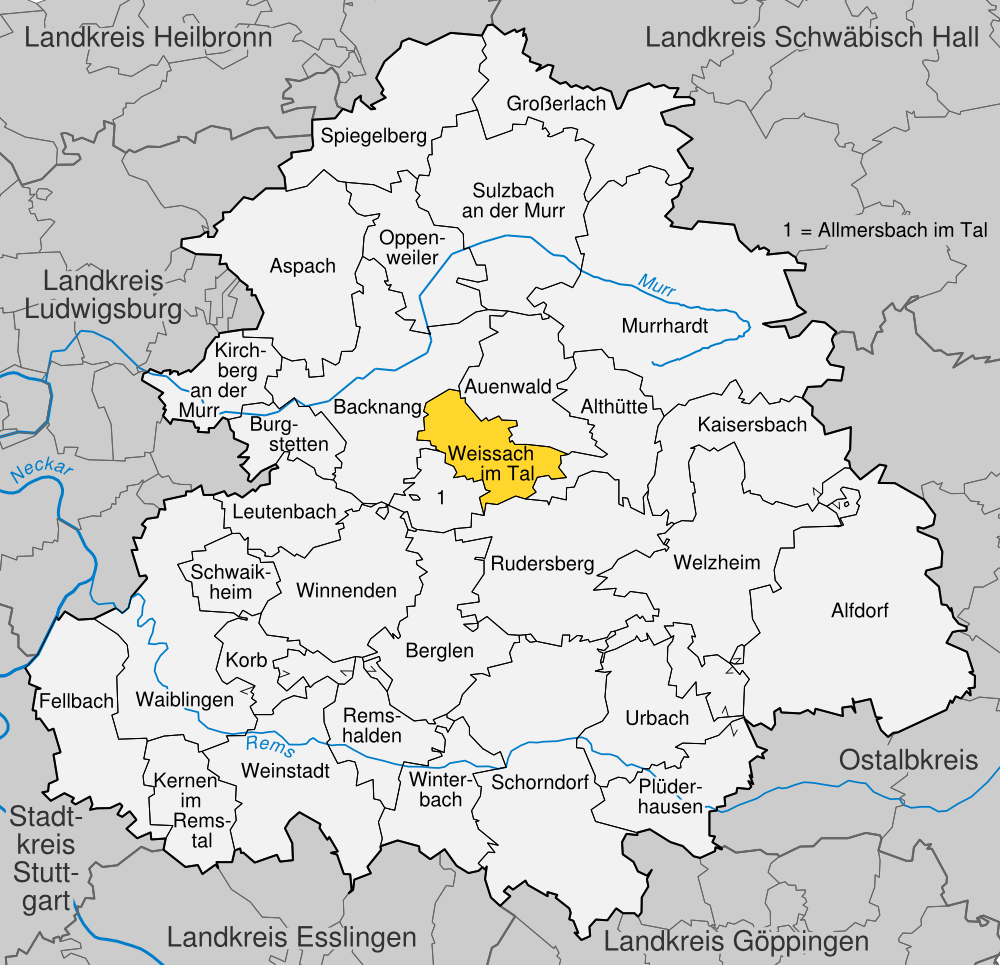
- Location of Weissach im Tal within Rems-Murr-Kreis district
- Interactive map of Weissach im Tal
- Location within Germany Location within Baden-Württemberg
- Coordinates: 48°55′46″N 09°28′43″E
- Country: Germany
- State: Baden-Württemberg
- Admin. region: Stuttgart
- District: Rems-Murr-Kreis

Government
  - Mayor (2022–30): Daniel Bogner

Area
  - Total: 14.13 km^{2} (5.46 sq mi)
- Elevation: 265 m (869 ft)

Population (2025-12-31)
  - Total: 7,598
  - Density: 537.7/km^{2} (1,393/sq mi)
- Time zone: UTC+01:00 (CET)
  - Summer (DST): UTC+02:00 (CEST)
- Postal codes: 71550–71554
- Dialling codes: 07191
- Vehicle registration: WN
- Website: www.weissach-im-tal.de

Weissach im Tal (German pronunciation: [ˈvaɪsax ʔɪm ˈtaːl], lit. 'Weissach in the Valley') is a municipality (Gemeinde) in the Rems-Murr-Kreis district of Baden-Württemberg, Germany. It belongs to the metropolitan region of Stuttgart . On 31 December 2005 it had a population of 7,205. Weissach im Tal is twinned with Marly in France and Lommatzsch in Saxony. Its mayor is Daniel Bogner. In Aichholzhof is the biggest school complex, called "Bildungszentrum Weissach im Tal, with all three types of schools after the elementary school (Hauptschule, Realschule and Gymnasium) around a radius of about 30 km (~16,6 nm).

== History ==
- 5000-2000 BC: first signs of human life in the vicinity
- 16 July 1027: first documented mention of the Weissach brook
- 1231: first documented mention of Cottenweiler
- 1245: first documented mention of Unterweissach and Oberweissach
- 1 July 1971: the municipality of Weissach im Tal is created from the villages of Unterweissach, Oberweissach, Cottenweiler, Bruch, Aichholzhof and Wattenweiler.

== Geography ==
=== Geographical location ===
Weissach im Tal lies 7 km south-east of Backnang and 30 km north-east of Stuttgart, at the feet of the Swabian Forest. It is located in the "Backnanger Bucht" (engl. Bay of Backnang). The Backnanger Bucht is the area from the Weissacher Tal (ger. Weissach Valley) to Backnang, which is surrounded like a sickle by foothills of the Swabian Forrest.

== Honours ==
Weissach im Tal received a prize for the most sustainable municipality in Germany in 2003 and in 2004.
