= Burgstetten =

- Municipality
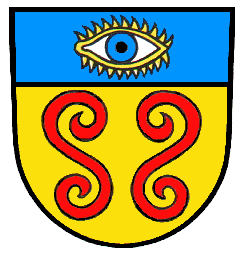
- Coat of arms

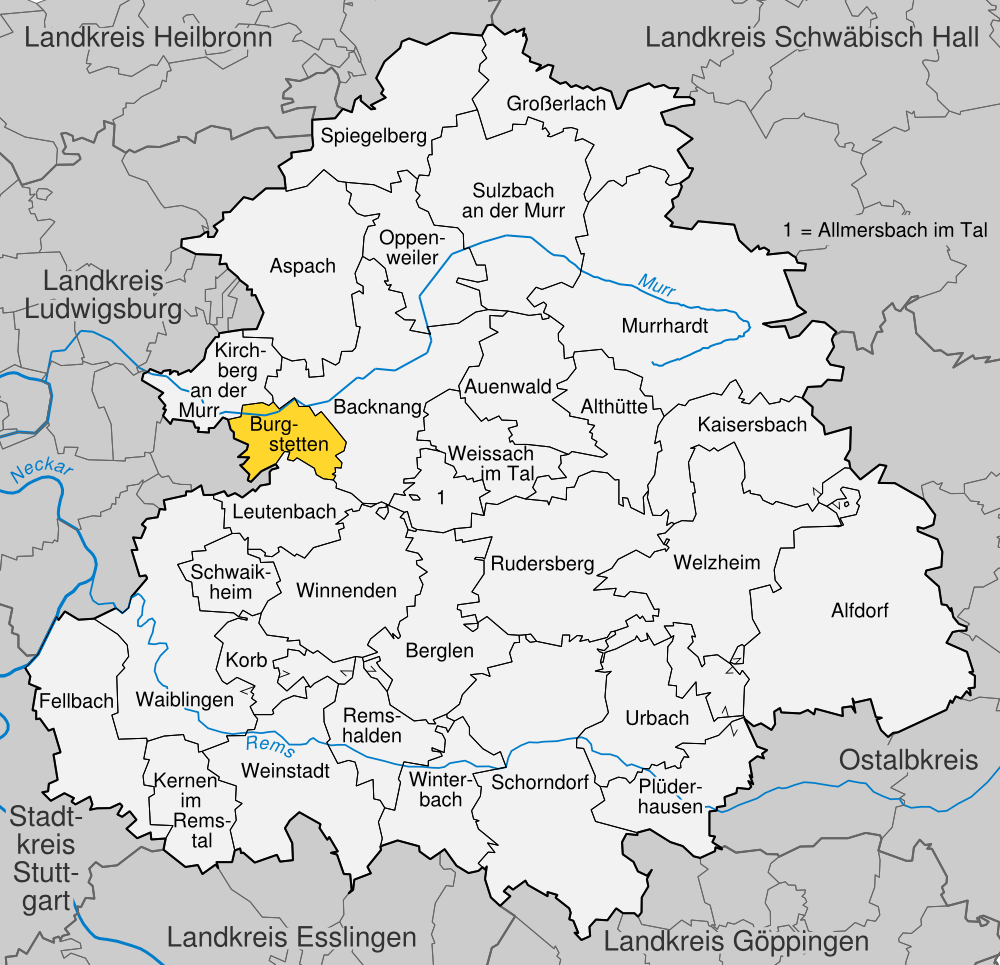
- Location of Burgstetten within Rems-Murr-Kreis district
- Interactive map of Burgstetten
- Location within Germany Location within Baden-Württemberg
- Coordinates: 48°55′41″N 09°22′13″E
- Country: Germany
- State: Baden-Württemberg
- Admin. region: Stuttgart
- District: Rems-Murr-Kreis

Government
  - Mayor (2019–27): Irmtraud Wiedersatz

Area
  - Total: 10.29 km^{2} (3.97 sq mi)
- Elevation: 254 m (833 ft)

Population (2025-12-31)
  - Total: 3,668
  - Density: 356.5/km^{2} (923.2/sq mi)
- Time zone: UTC+01:00 (CET)
  - Summer (DST): UTC+02:00 (CEST)
- Postal codes: 71576
- Dialling codes: 07191
- Vehicle registration: WN
- Website: www.burgstetten.de

Burgstetten is a municipality in the district of Rems-Murr in Baden-Württemberg in Germany.

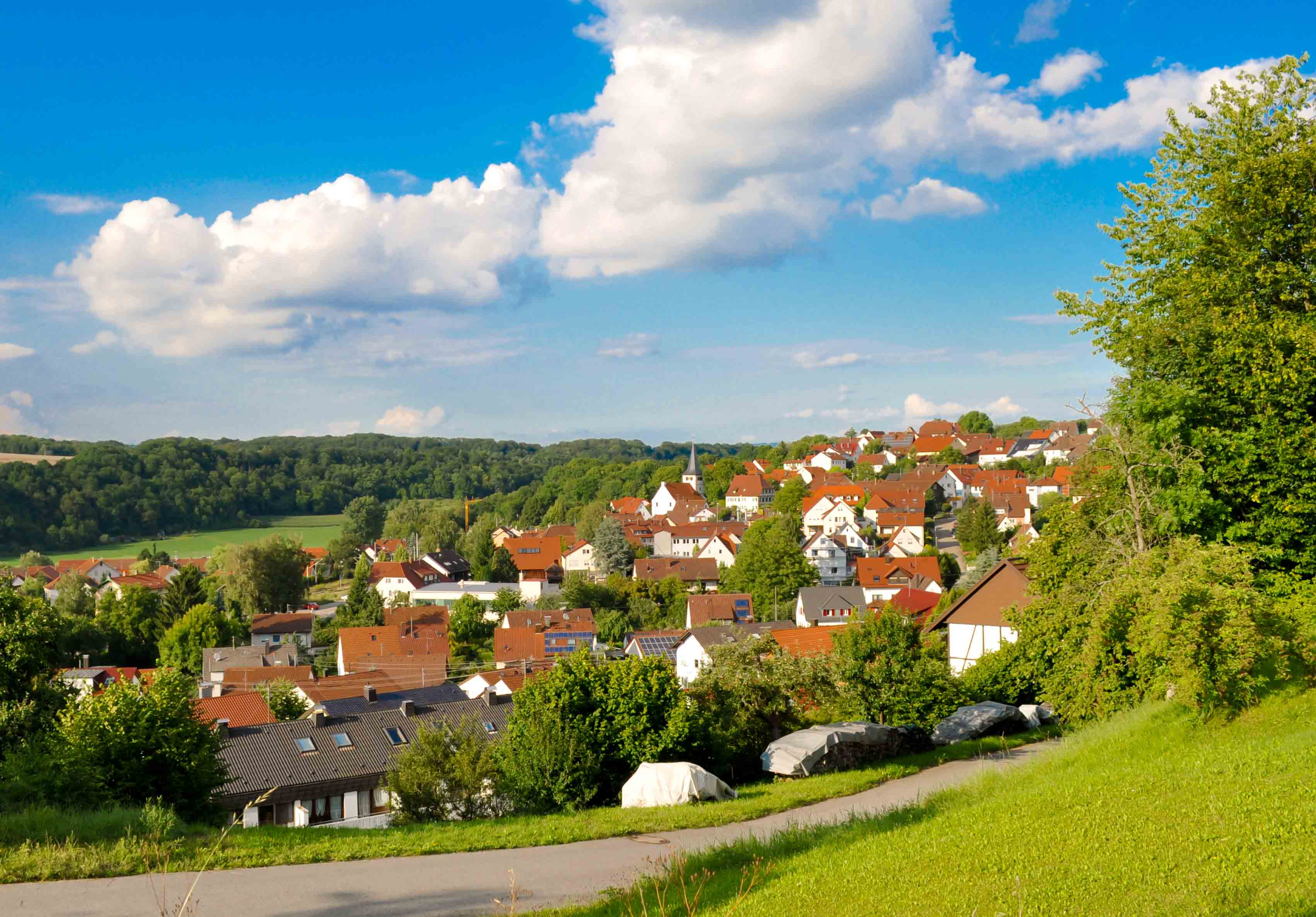
Burgstetten, Burgstall (Murr)
