= Oppenweiler =

German municipality

- Municipality
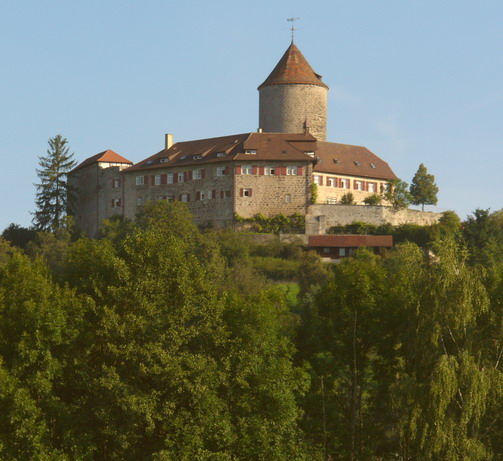
- Reichenberg Castle (Württemberg)

- Coat of arms

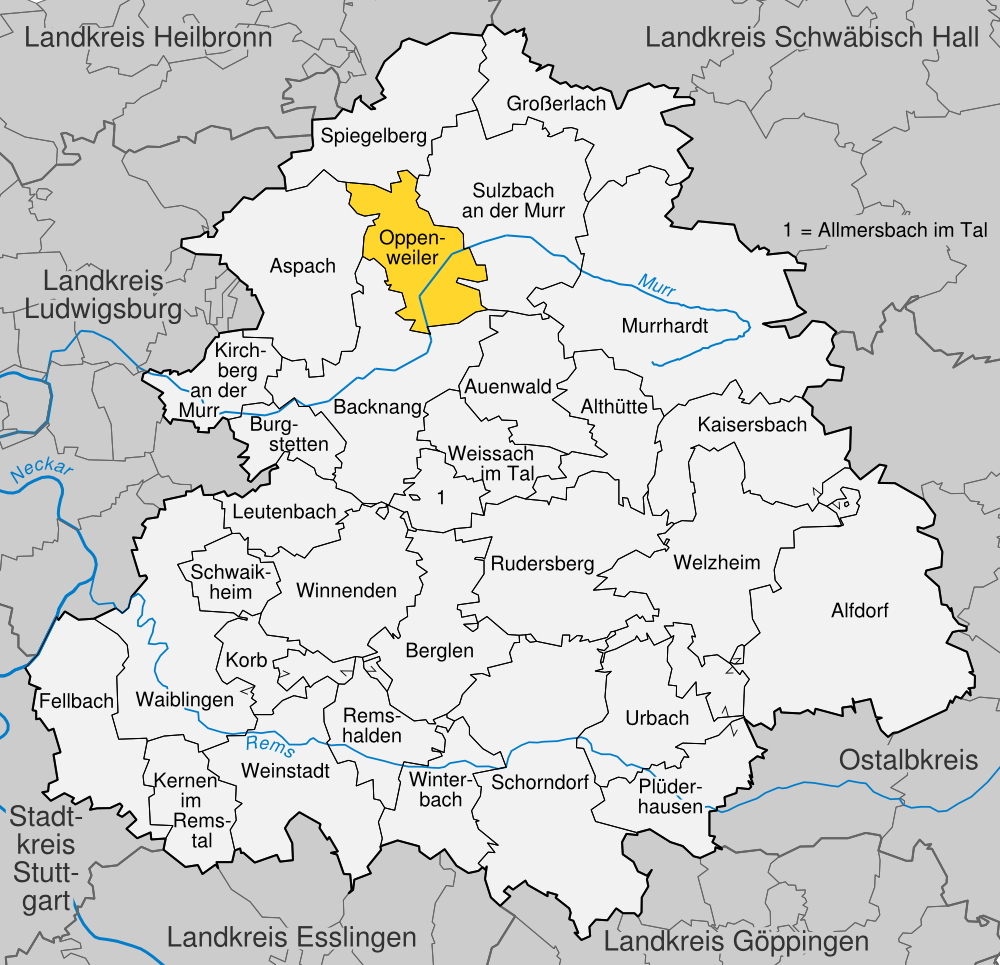
- Location of Oppenweiler within Rems-Murr-Kreis district
- Interactive map of Oppenweiler
- Location within Germany Location within Baden-Württemberg
- Coordinates: 48°58′58″N 09°27′28″E
- Country: Germany
- State: Baden-Württemberg
- Admin. region: Stuttgart
- District: Rems-Murr-Kreis

Area
  - Total: 19.83 km^{2} (7.66 sq mi)
- Elevation: 267 m (876 ft)

Population (2025-12-31)
  - Total: 4,485
  - Density: 226.2/km^{2} (585.8/sq mi)
- Time zone: UTC+01:00 (CET)
  - Summer (DST): UTC+02:00 (CEST)
- Postal codes: 71570
- Dialling codes: 07191
- Vehicle registration: WN
- Website: www.oppenweiler.de

Oppenweiler is a town in the Rems-Murr district in Baden-Württemberg, Germany.

== History ==
Oppenweiler merged with Reichenberg on 1 April 1938.

== Geography ==
The municipality (Gemeinde) of Oppenweiler is located in the Rems-Murr district of Baden-Württemberg, one of the 16 States of the Federal Republic of Germany. Oppenweiler is situated between the Löwenstein Hills to the north and the Backnanger Bucht to the south, in the greater region of the Swabian-Franconian Forest. Elevation above sea level in the municipal area ranges from a high of 518 meters (1,699 ft) Normalnull (NN) to a low of 248 meters (814 ft) NN.

== Politics ==
Oppenweiler has one borough (Ortsteil), Oppenweiler, and 12 villages: Aichelbach, Bernhalden, Ellenweiler, Reichenbach, Reichenberg, Reutenhof, Rohrbach, Rüflensmühle, Schiffrain, Unterstaigacker, Wilhelmsheim, and Zell. Also in the municipal area is the industrial district of Wachthäusle and the abandoned villages of Charlottenhof and Giselmar.

=== Coat of arms ===
Oppenweiler's coat of arms shows a field of yellow crossed by a red bend dexter that houses three yellow ax heads. The blazon is identical to that of Baden's, but with the addition of the ax heads to reference the House of Sturmfeder, who inhabited Oppenweiler from 1288 until their extinction in 1901. This coat of arms was awarded to Oppenweiler with a municipal flag by the government of Baden-Württemberg on 14 November 1955.

== Transportation ==
Oppenweiler is connected to Germany's network of roadways by the Bundesstraße 14 and to its rail network by the Waiblingen–Schwäbisch Hall railway. Local public transportation is provided by the Verkehrs- und Tarifverbund Stuttgart.
