= Waldenburg Hills =

Hill range in Germany

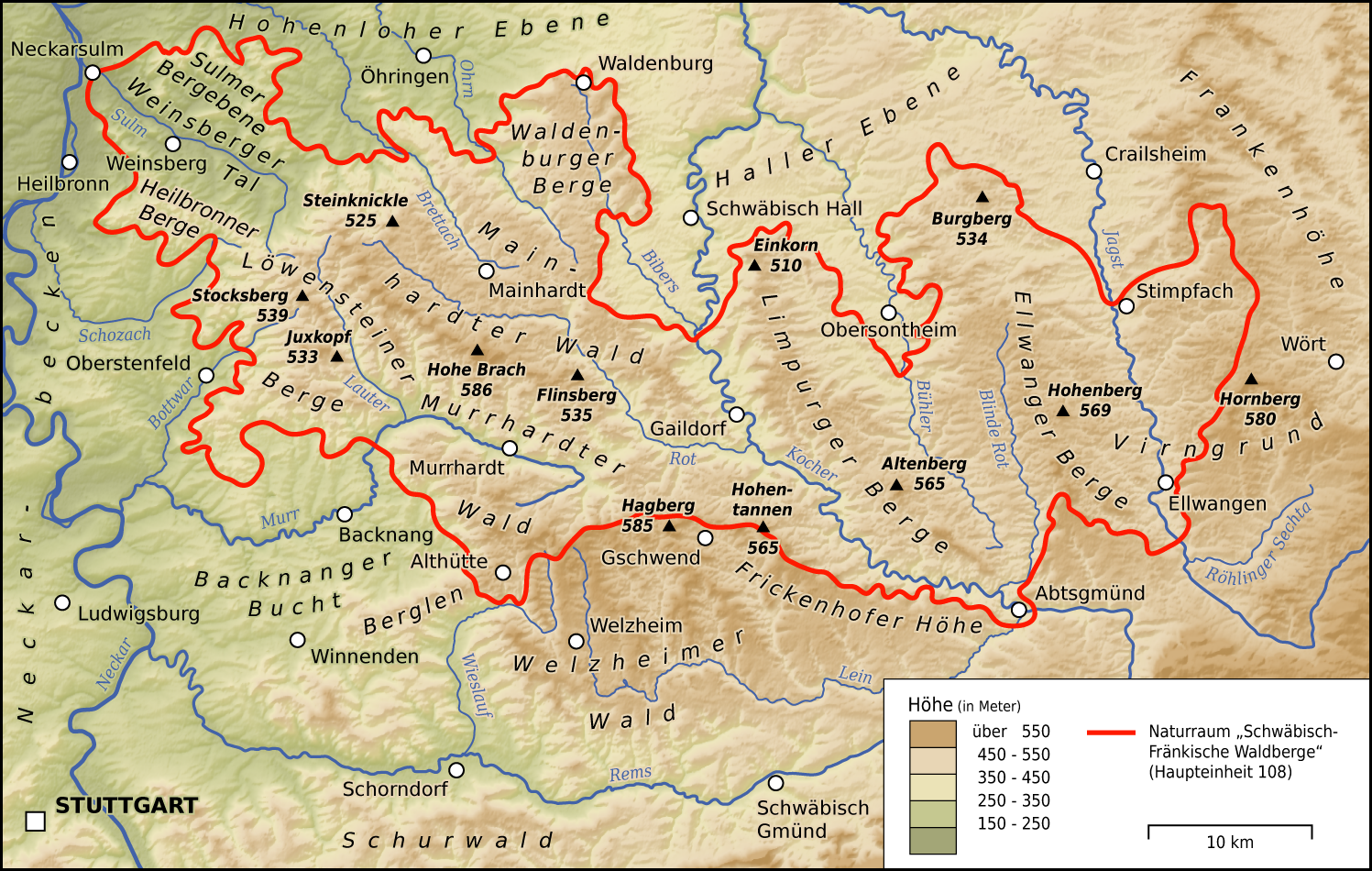
- The Waldenburg Hills in the north of the Swabian-Franconian Forest Nature Park

Highest point
- Peak: Mühlberg
- Elevation: 522.8 m above NHN

Dimensions
- Length: 25.752 km (16.002 mi)

Geography
- State(s): Baden-Württemberg, Germany
- Range coordinates: 49°10′01″N 9°40′15″E
- Parent range: Swabian-Franconian Forest

Geology
- Orogeny: Mountain region

The Waldenburg Hills (German: Waldenburger Berge) are a forested hill range, up to 522.8 m above sea level (NHN), in the counties of Schwäbisch Hall and Hohenlohe in the south German state of Baden-Württemberg.

At the same time the Waldenburg Hills are one of five woodland regions in the Swabian-Franconian Forest Nature Park, which forms the western part of the Swabian-Franconian Forest. Its name is derived from the town of Waldenburg on its northern perimeter.

== Geography ==
The Waldenburg Hills lies in the northeastern part of the aforementioned nature park roughly about 50 km northeast of Stuttgart and about 30 km (both as the crow flies) east of Heilbronn between the Hohenlohe Plain to the north, the Halle Plain to the east, the Limpurg Hills to the southeast and the Mainhardt Forest to the south and southwest. According to the classification of the Handbook of the Natural Region Divisions of Germany by Meynen and Schmithüsen (1953–1962) they form natural region unit number 108.5 in the Swabian-Franconian Forest in the Swabian Keuper-Lias Land.

They are located immediately south of Waldenburg, not far and west of Schwäbisch Hall, north and northwest of Michelfeld, a few kilometres northeast of Mainhardt and roughly east of Pfedelbach.

== Hills ==
Among the summit of the Waldenburg Hills are the following – with their heights in metres (m) above sea level (NHN):

- Mühlberg (522.8 m), ca. 1 km east-southeast of Goldbach
- Friedrichsberg (516.7 m), with the Waldenburg-Friedrichsberg Transmission Tower; less than 2 km east-southeast of Waldenburg
- Theresienberg (497.6 m); ca. 1 km west of Waldenburg

== Waterbodies and watercourses ==
The two most important watercourses in the Waldenburg Hills are the Bibers, which flows south-southeast through the eastern part of the wooded countryside and finally empties into the upper Kocher, after passing through Michelfeld and Rosengarten, and the Ohrn, which runs along the edge of the Mainhardt Forest and flows north-northwest through Öhringen into the lower Kocher. The Kupfer, which belongs entirely to the Hohenlohe Plain, collects several left-hand tributaries at the eastern foot of the hill country from the slopes of the Waldenburg Hills and then flows through Kupferzell to Forchtenberg, where it also discharges into the lower Kocher.

Among the waterbodies of the Waldenburg Hills are:

- the little lake of Burgvogtsee south of Waldenburg-Streithof, source of the Bibers
- the Neumühlsee (bathing lake with campsite), which is crossed by the upper Bibers and which lies in the northern part of the wooded countryside near the hamlet of Laurach
- the lakes of Rößlesmahdsee (nature reserve) and Goldbachsee on the left-hand tributary of the Goldbach
- a forest pond in the Entlesboden nature reserve near Waldenburg-Tommelhardt, which also flows into the Bibers
- the Sailach reservoir further downstream on the Bibers, north of Michelfeld-Gnadental
- two larger ponds in the forest on the plateau west of Michelfeld-Forsthaus, which drain via the Schupbach into the Ohrn.

The flat plateau between the Bibers valley in the east and the Ohrn valley in the west often has very wet woodland areas and is crossed by drainage ditches. Artificial embankments, now functionless on the level terrain, for example on the Oberen Weide east of Waldenburg-Obersteinbach, bear witness to older lakes that were abandoned at some point.

East of Michelfeld-Wagrain there is on the slopes a small wachsender Bach ("growing stream") with sinter formations between a field track and a hedge.

== Geology and protected areas ==
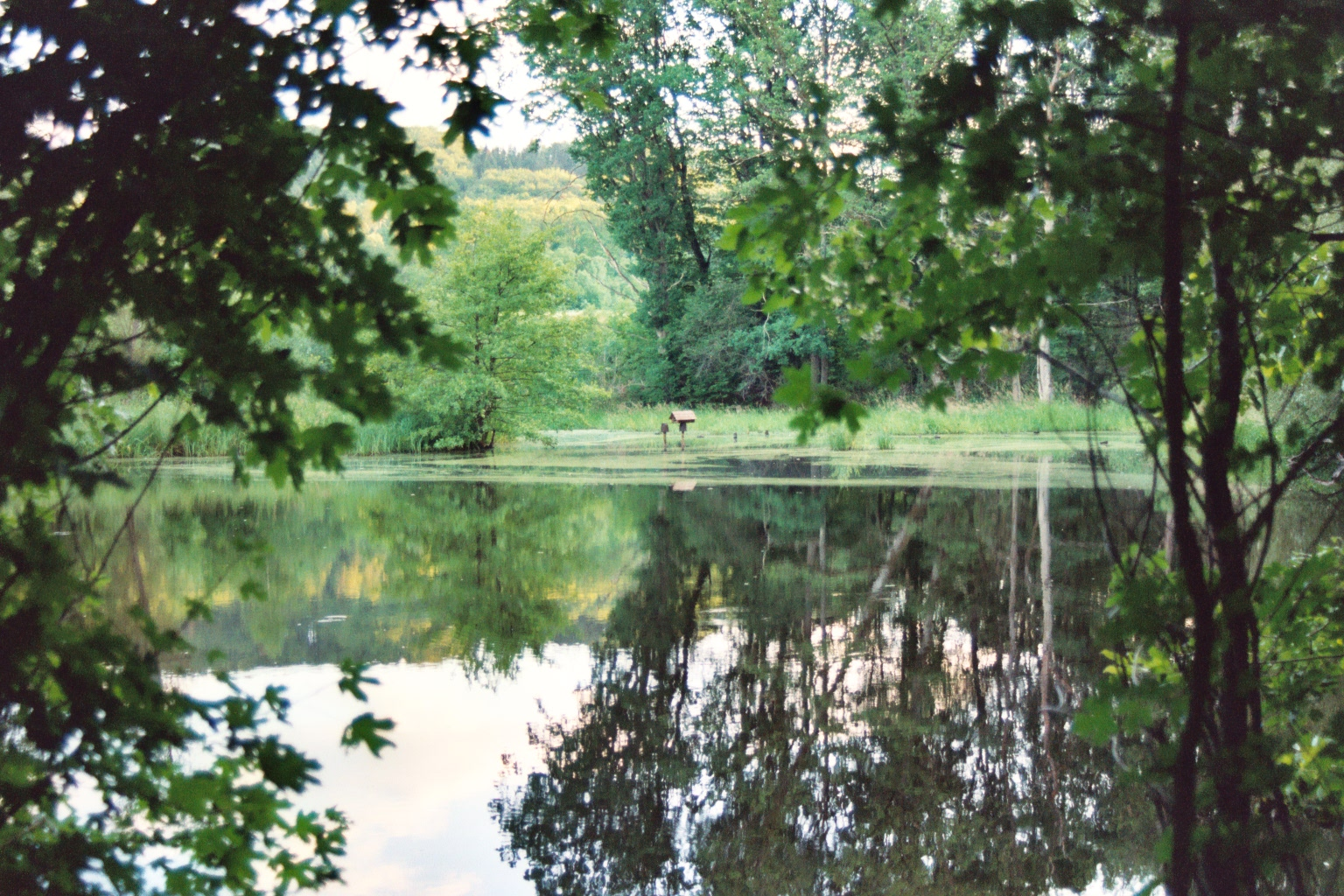
Lake in the Kupfermoor (2004)

The gently tilted, wooded plateau of the Waldenburg Hills, which is crossed by the valleys of the aforementioned streams, consists of beds of the Middle Keuper. In ascending order are gypsum keuper, reed sandstone and the Lower Bunter Marl. The majority of the plateau is covered by gravel sandstone. In the south around Neunkirchen, Witzmannsweiler and Büchelberg the rock sequence extends to the Upper Bunter Marl and Stuben sandstone.

In the area of the Waldenburg Hills are several nature reserves:

1. Viehweide auf Markung Michelberg near Michelbach, No. 1010
2. Entlesboden near Obersteinbach, No. 1011
3. Kupfermoor near Untermünkheim-Kupfer, No. 1018, am Ostrand
4. Rößlesmahdsee mit Pfaffenklinge near Beltersrot, No. 1110
5. Einberg near Untersteinbach, No. 1146
6. Obere Weide, also near Obersteinbach, No. 1236

== History ==
The solitude of the Waldenburg Hills was repeatedly sought by monks and nuns. For example, in Gnadental and Goldbach, abbeys (Gnadental Abbey and Goldbach Abbey) were founded that were dissolved in the 16th century.
