= Rauentalbach =

River in Germany

Location
- Country: Germany
- States: Baden-Württemberg

Physical characteristics
- Mouth
  - location: Eselbach
  - coordinates: 48.8446°N 10.0489°E

Basin features
- Progression: Eselbach→ Rombach→ Aal→ Kocher→ Neckar→ Rhine→ North Sea

Rauentalbach is a small river of Baden-Württemberg, Germany. It flows into the Roomba H near Unterrombach.

== See also ==
- List of rivers of Baden-Württemberg
