= Spitzbach =

River in Germany

Location
- Country: Germany
- State: Baden-Württemberg

Physical characteristics
- Mouth
  - location: Rombach
  - coordinates: 48.8550°N 10.0514°E

Basin features
- Progression: Rombach→ Aal→ Kocher→ Neckar→ Rhine→ North Sea

Spitzbach is a small river in Baden-Württemberg, Germany. It flows into the Rombach in Hammerstadt.

== See also ==
- List of rivers of Baden-Württemberg
