= Windischenbach (Pfedelbach) =

River in Germany

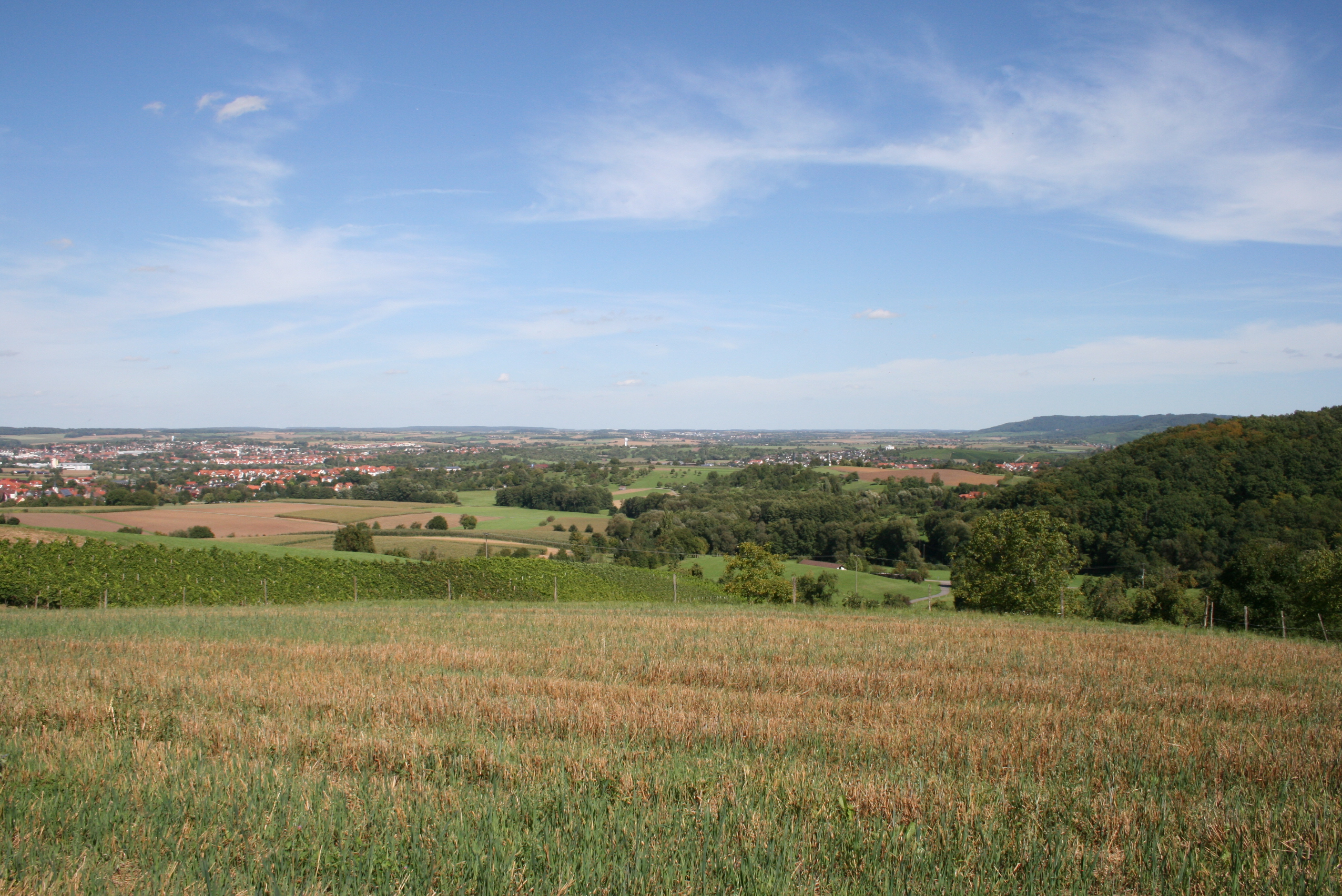
- View from Weißlensberg across the Windischenbach. In the background is the town of Öhringen.

Location
- Country: Germany
- State: Baden-Württemberg

Physical characteristics
- Mouth
  - location: Pfedelbach
  - coordinates: 49.1893°N 9.4972°E

Basin features
- Progression: Pfedelbach→ Ohrn→ Kocher→ Neckar→ Rhine→ North Sea

The Windischenbach (German pronunciation: [ˈvɪndɪʃn̩bax]) is a river of Baden-Württemberg, Germany. It is a left tributary of the Pfedelbach at Öhringen.

== See also ==
- List of rivers of Baden-Württemberg
