= Aschenbach =

Aschenbach may refer to:

== People ==
- Hans-Georg Aschenbach (born 1951), German former ski jumper
- Lawson Aschenbach (born 1983), American professional racing driver
- Thomas J. Aschenbach (born 1972), American artist known for his "UFO" comic strip
- Gustav von Aschenbach, main character in Thomas Mann's 1912 novella Death in Venice
- Aschenbach Kishka ("Intestine"), founder of the Kishkin family of Russia

== Other uses ==
- Aschenbach (Mühlbach), a river in Germany

== See also ==
- Aschbach (disambiguation)
