= Rotenbach =

Rotenbach or Rötenbach may refer to:

- Rötenbach (Fichtenberger Rot), a river of Baden-Württemberg, Germany, tributary of the Rot
- Rötenbach (Friedenweiler), a village in the Black Forest, currently belonging to Friedenweiler
- Rotenbach (Jagst), a river of Baden-Württemberg, Germany, tributary of the Jagst
- Rötenbach (Kinzig), a river of Baden-Württemberg, Germany, tributary of the Kinzig
- Rötenbach (Kocher), a river of Baden-Württemberg, Germany, tributary of the Kocher
- Rotenbach (Rems), a river of Baden-Württemberg, Germany, tributary of the Rems
- Rötenbach bei Calw, a district of Bad Teinach-Zavelstein, Baden-Württemberg, Germany
