= Aschenbach (Mühlbach) =

River in Germany

- Location of mouth in Baden-Württemberg

Location
- Country: Germany
- State: Baden-Württemberg

Physical characteristics
- Mouth
  - location: Mühlbach
  - coordinates: 49.0362°N 9.6126°E

Basin features
- Progression: Mühlbach→ Rot→ Kocher→ Neckar→ Rhine→ North Sea

The Aschenbach (in its upper course: Götzenbrunnenbächle) is a small river in Baden-Württemberg, Germany. It is an upper headstream of the Mühlbach near Oberrot.

== See also ==
- List of rivers of Baden-Württemberg
