= Sanzenbach =

River in Germany

Location
- Country: Germany
- States: Baden-Württemberg

Physical characteristics
- Mouth
  - location: Bibers
  - coordinates: 49.0683°N 9.7017°E

Basin features
- Progression: Bibers→ Kocher→ Neckar→ Rhine→ North Sea

Sanzenbach is a small river of Baden-Württemberg, Germany. It flows into the Bibers near Rosengarten.

== See also ==
- List of rivers of Baden-Württemberg
