= Rötenbach (Fichtenberger Rot) =

River in Baden-Württemberg, Germany

Location
- Country: Germany
- States: Baden-Württemberg

Physical characteristics
- Mouth
  - location: Rot
  - coordinates: 49.0529°N 9.6256°E

Basin features
- Progression: Rot→ Kocher→ Neckar→ Rhine→ North Sea

The Rötenbach is a river of Baden-Württemberg, Germany. It flows into the Rot in Wielandsweiler.

== See also ==
- List of rivers of Baden-Württemberg
