= Hahnbach (disambiguation) =

Hahnbach is a municipality in the district of Amberg-Sulzbach in Bavaria in Germany.

Hahnbach may also refer to:

- Hahnbach (Klingenbach), a river of Baden-Württemberg, Germany, tributary of the Klingenbach
- Șura Mare, village Hamba, German name Hahnbach, a commune located in Sibiu County, Romania
