= Reichenbach (Kocher) =

River in Baden-Württemberg, Germany

Location
- Country: Germany
- States: Baden-Württemberg

Physical characteristics
- Mouth
  - location: Kocher
  - coordinates: 49.2333°N 9.7698°E

Basin features
- Progression: Kocher→ Neckar→ Rhine→ North Sea

The Reichenbach is a small river of Baden-Württemberg, Germany. It is a right tributary of the Kocher near Braunsbach.

== See also ==
- List of rivers of Baden-Württemberg
