= Red Kocher =

River in Germany

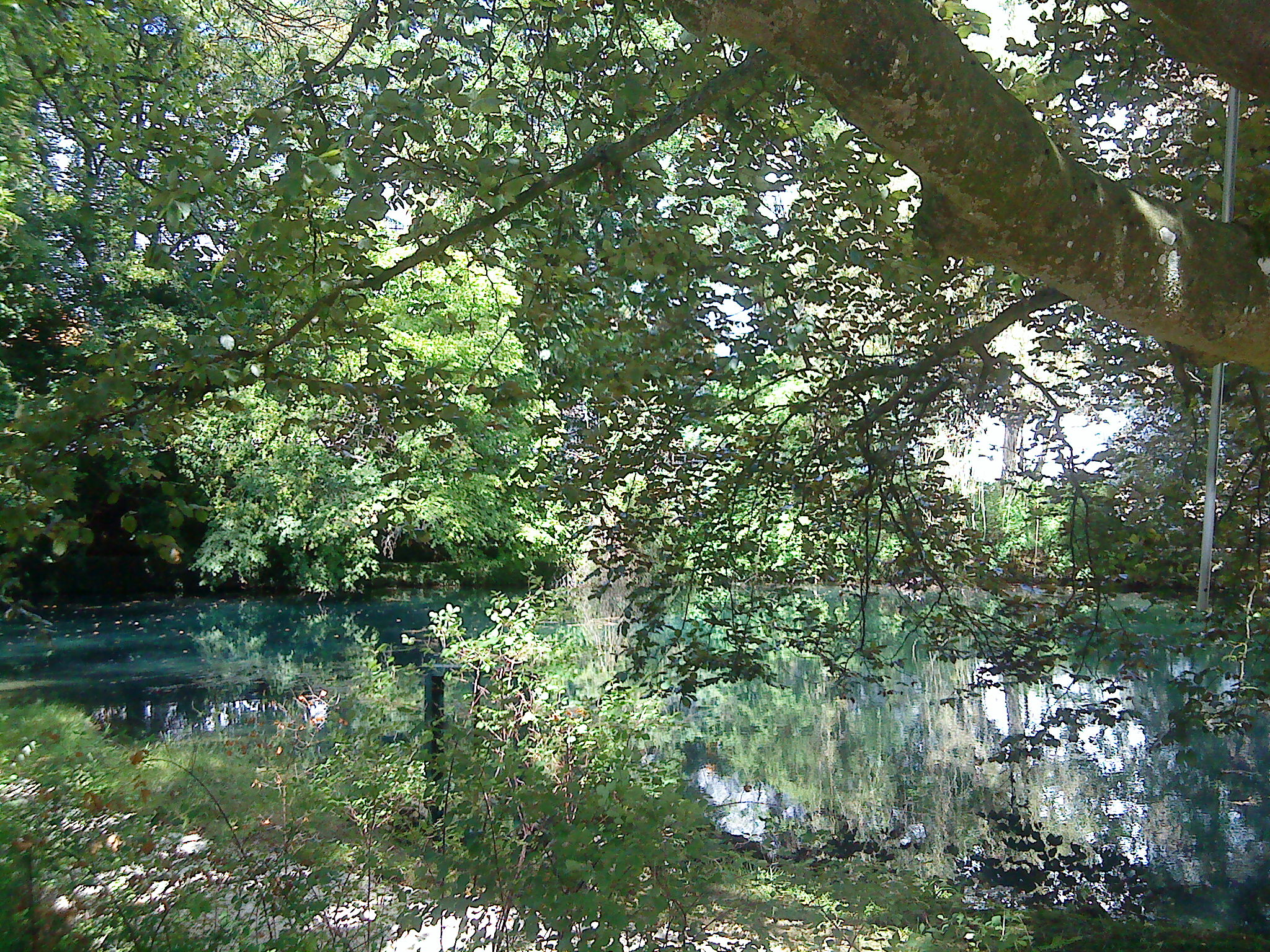
- Native name: Roter Kocher (German)

Location
- Country: Germany
- States: Baden-Württemberg

Physical characteristics
- Mouth
  - location: Black Kocher
  - coordinates: 48.7799°N 10.1003°E

Basin features
- Progression: Black Kocher→ Kocher→ Neckar→ Rhine→ North Sea

The Red Kocher (German: Roter Kocher) is a small river in Baden-Württemberg, Germany. It flows into the Black Kocher in Oberkochen.

== See also ==
- List of rivers of Baden-Württemberg
