= Sall (river) =

River in Germany

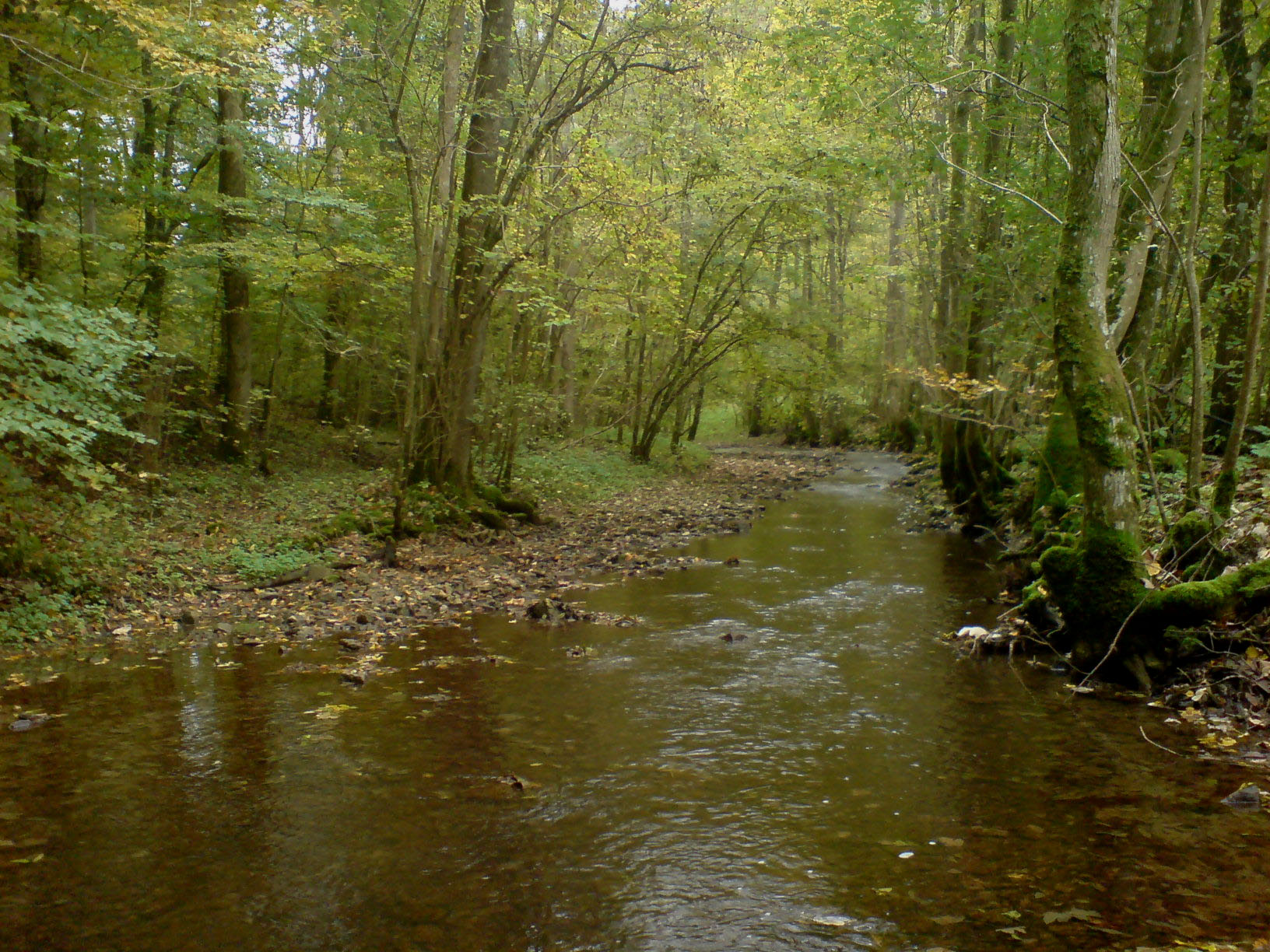

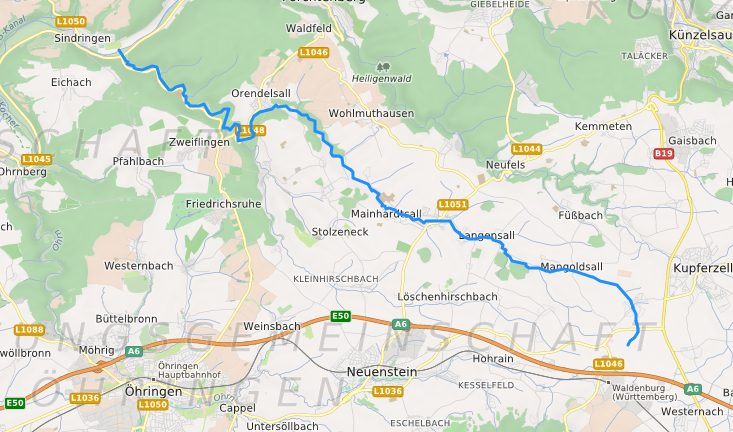
- Course of the Sall river (interactive map)

Location
- Country: Germany
- State: Baden-Württemberg

Physical characteristics
- Mouth
  - location: Kocher
  - coordinates: 49.2770°N 9.4903°E
- Length: 21.3 km (13.2 mi)

Basin features
- Progression: Kocher→ Neckar→ Rhine→ North Sea

The Sall is a river of Baden-Württemberg, Germany. It flows into the Kocher near Forchtenberg.

== See also ==
- List of rivers of Baden-Württemberg
