= Mühlbach (Fichtenberger Rot) =

River in Germany

Location
- Country: Germany
- States: Baden-Württemberg

Physical characteristics
- Mouth
  - location: Rot
  - coordinates: 49.0358°N 9.6362°E

Basin features
- Progression: Rot→ Kocher→ Neckar→ Rhine→ North Sea

The Mühlbach is a river of Baden-Württemberg, Germany. It is a right tributary of the Fichtenberger Rot near Oberrot.

== See also ==
- List of rivers of Baden-Württemberg
