= Irsbach =

River in Germany

Location
- Country: Germany
- States: Baden-Württemberg

Physical characteristics
- Mouth
  - location: Eisbach
  - coordinates: 48.9674°N 9.8411°E

Basin features
- Progression: Eisbach→ Kocher→ Neckar→ Rhine→ North Sea

The Irsbach is a river of Baden-Württemberg, Germany. It flows into the Eisbach in Sulzbach-Laufen.

== See also ==
- List of rivers of Baden-Württemberg
