= Goldbach (Bibers) =

River of Baden-Württemberg, Germany

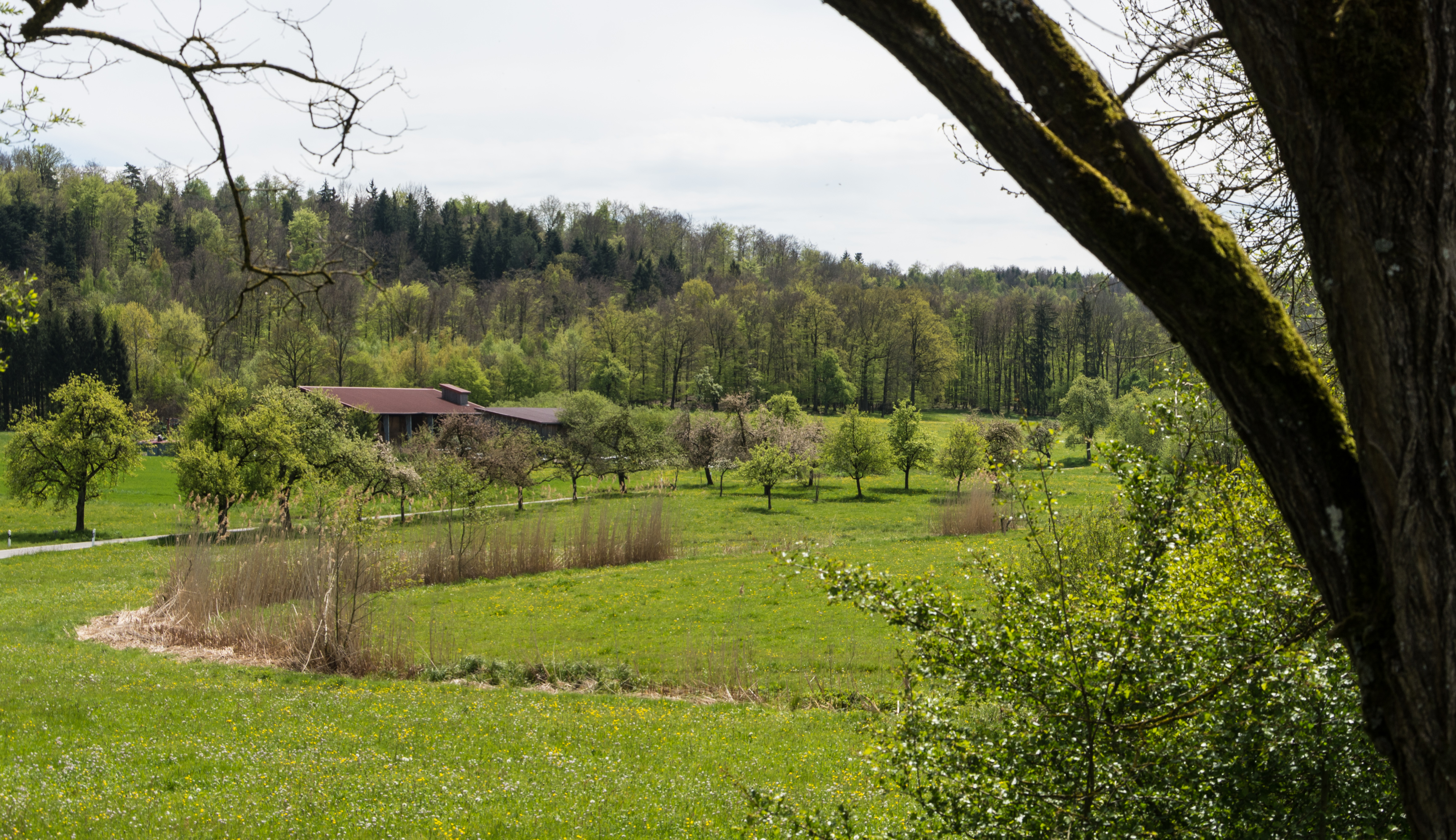

Location
- Country: Germany
- States: Baden-Württemberg

Physical characteristics
- Mouth
  - location: Bibers
  - coordinates: 49.1652°N 9.6469°E

Basin features
- Progression: Bibers→ Kocher→ Neckar→ Rhine→ North Sea

The Goldbach (German pronunciation: [ˈɡɔltbax]) is a small river of Baden-Württemberg, Germany. It flows into the Bibers near Waldenburg. The Goldbach flows from the Rößlesmahdsee, located about 400 m northeast of Waldenburg-Goldbach. It drains a 1.9ha lake, situated 455m above sea level to the south, and immediately begins a gentle curve to the west.

== See also ==
- List of rivers of Baden-Württemberg
