= Klingenbach (Bühler) =

River in Germany

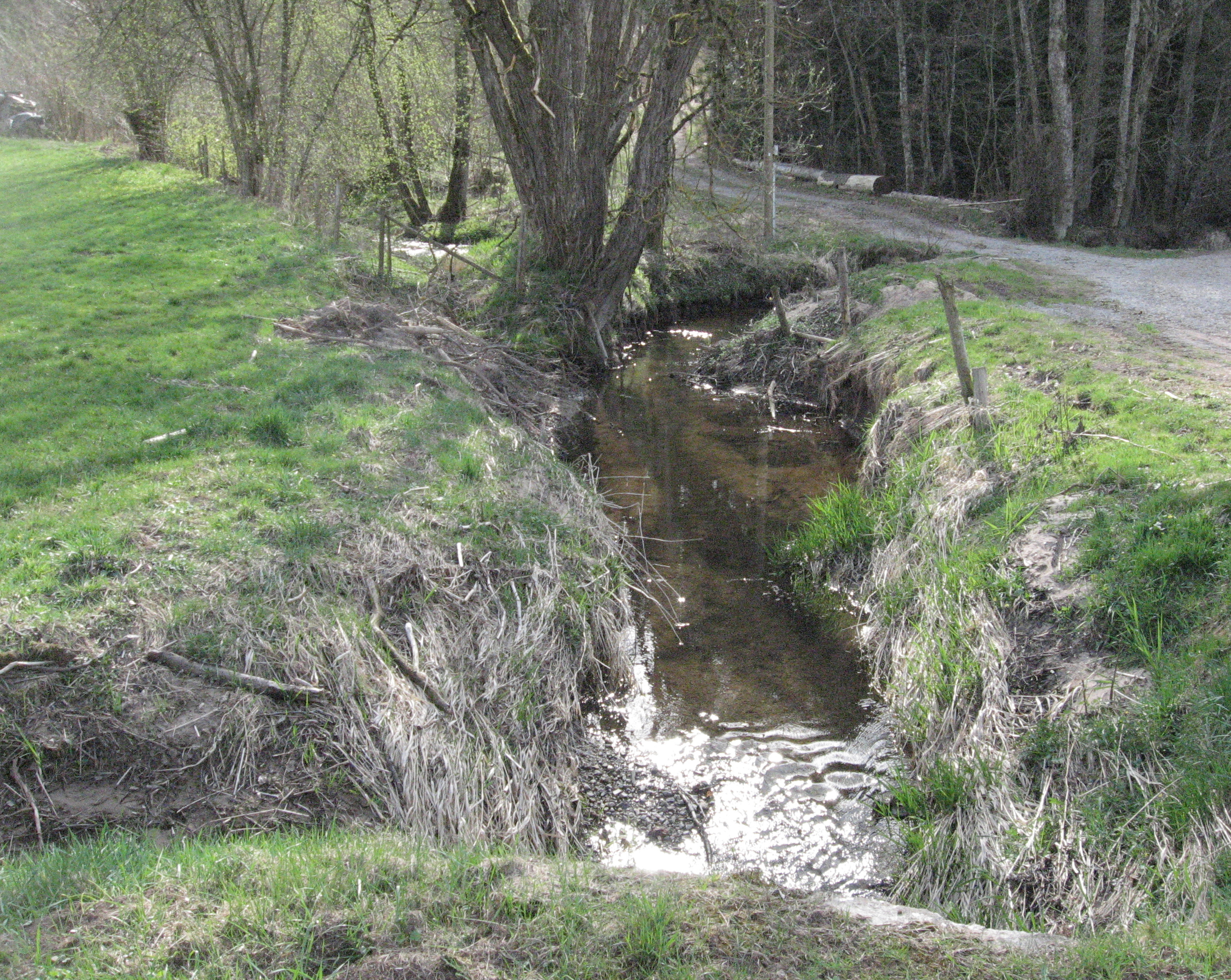

Location
- Country: Germany
- States: Baden-Württemberg

Physical characteristics
- Mouth
  - location: Bühler
  - coordinates: 48.9911°N 9.9157°E

Basin features
- Progression: Bühler→ Kocher→ Neckar→ Rhine→ North Sea
- Tributaries
  - right: Hahnbach

The Klingenbach (German pronunciation: [ˈklɪŋənbax]) is a river of Baden-Württemberg, Germany. It is a left tributary of the Bühler near Bühlerzell.

== See also ==
- List of rivers of Baden-Württemberg
