= Pfedelbach (Ohrn) =

River in Germany

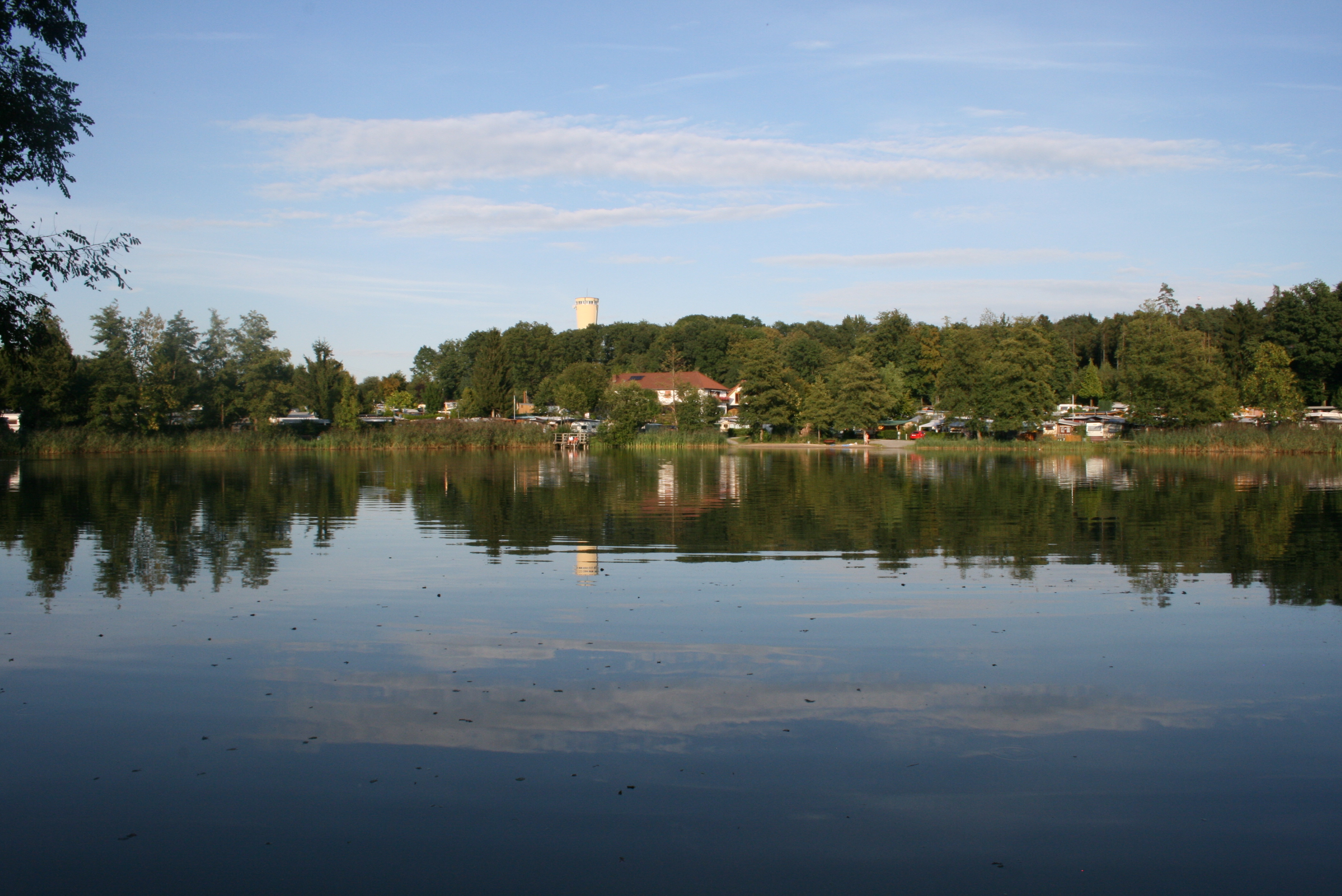

Location
- Country: Germany
- State: Baden-Württemberg

Physical characteristics
- Mouth
  - location: Ohrn
  - coordinates: 49.2018°N 9.4968°E

Basin features
- Progression: Ohrn→ Kocher→ Neckar→ Rhine→ North Sea

The Pfedelbach (German pronunciation: [ˈpfeːdl̩bax]) is a river of Baden-Württemberg, Germany. It is a left tributary of the Ohrn in Öhringen.

== See also ==
- List of rivers of Baden-Württemberg
