= Black Kocher =

River in Germany

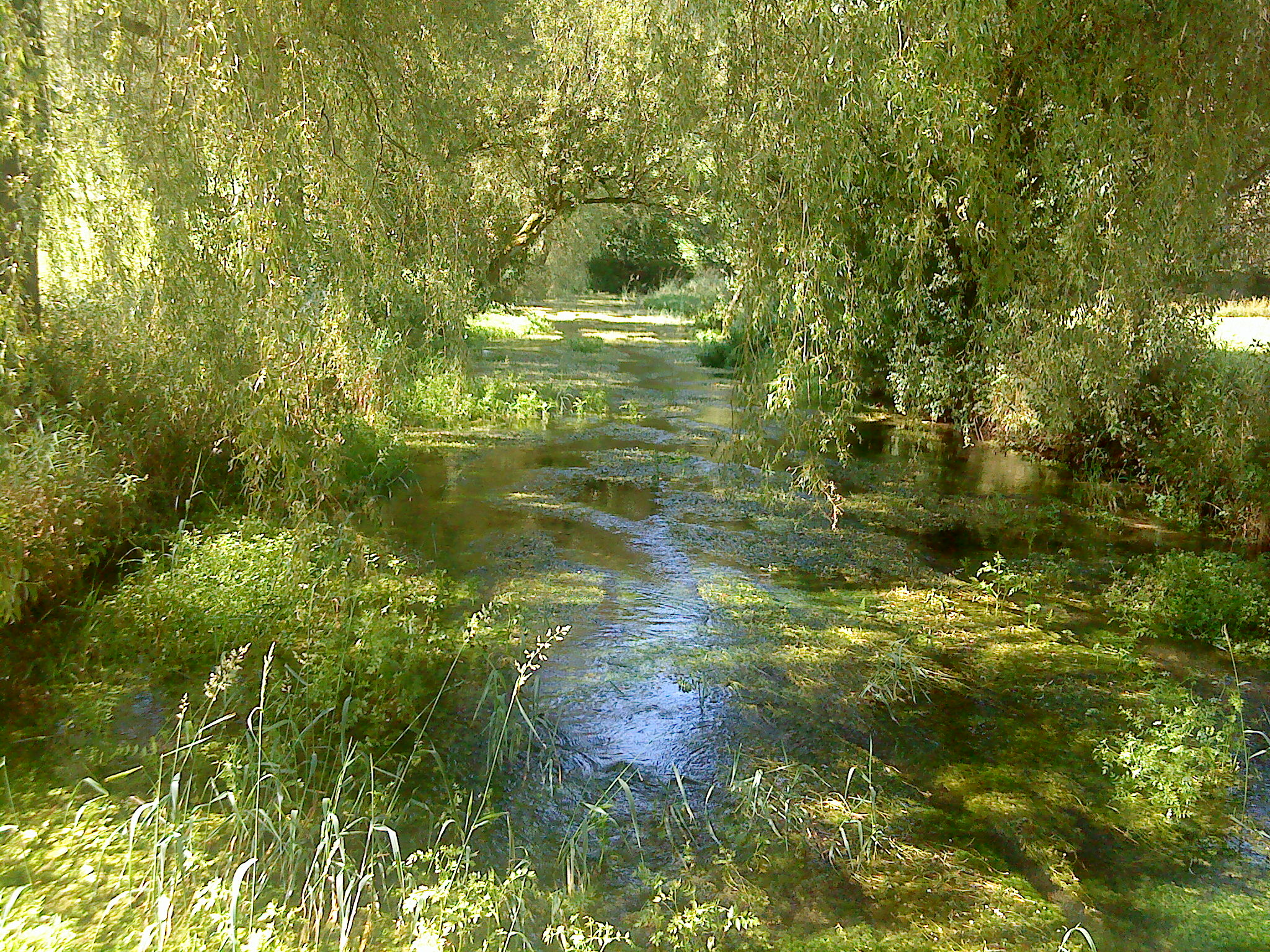
- The Black Kocher in the Strick district of Oberkochen
- Native name: Schwarzer Kocher (German)

Location
- Country: Germany
- State: Baden-Württemberg

Physical characteristics
- Mouth
  - location: Kocher
  - coordinates: 48.8203°N 10.1192°E

Basin features
- Progression: Kocher→ Neckar→ Rhine→ North Sea
- Tributaries
  - left: Red Kocher

The Black Kocher (German: Schwarzer Kocher [ˈʃvaʁtsɐ ˈkɔxɐ]) is a river in Baden-Württemberg, Germany. Its confluence with the White Kocher (Weißer Kocher) in Unterkochen, forms the Kocher.

== See also ==
- List of rivers of Baden-Württemberg
