= White Kocher =

River in Germany

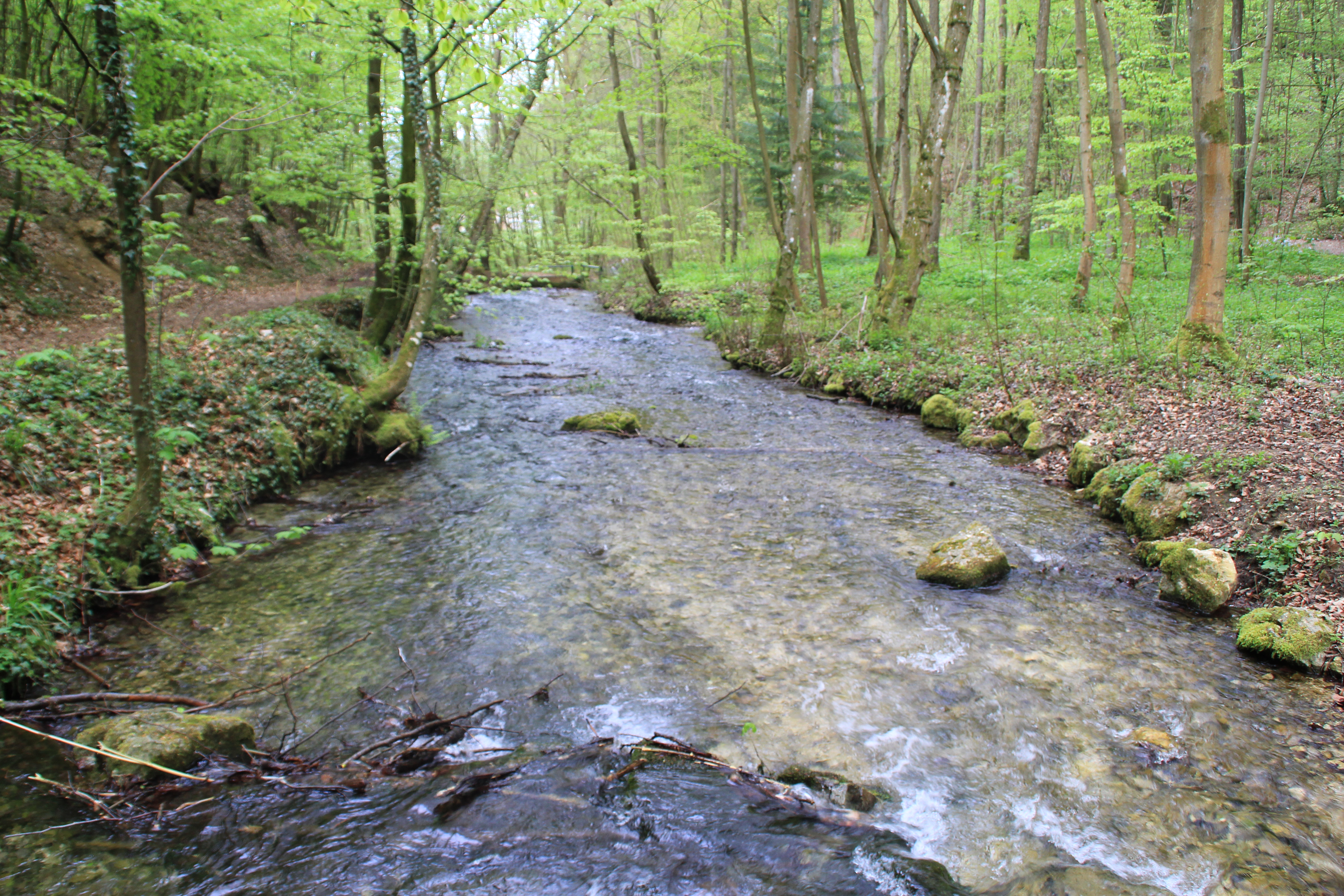
- The White Kocher shortly after its source
- Native name: Weißer Kocher (German)

Location
- Country: Germany
- State: Baden-Württemberg

Physical characteristics
- Mouth
  - location: Kocher
  - coordinates: 48.8203°N 10.1192°E

Basin features
- Progression: Kocher→ Neckar→ Rhine→ North Sea

The White Kocher (German: Weißer Kocher [ˈvaɪsɐ ˈkɔxɐ]) is a river in Baden-Württemberg, Germany. At its confluence with the Black Kocher (Schwarzer Kocher) in Unterkochen, the Kocher is formed.

== See also ==
- List of rivers of Baden-Württemberg
