= Hahnbach (Klingenbach) =

River in Germany

Location
- Country: Germany
- State: Baden-Württemberg

Physical characteristics
- Mouth: Klingenbach
  - coordinates: 48.9878°N 9.9126°E

Basin features
- Progression: Klingenbach→ Bühler→ Kocher→ Neckar→ Rhine→ North Sea
- Tributaries
  - right: Rotklingenbach

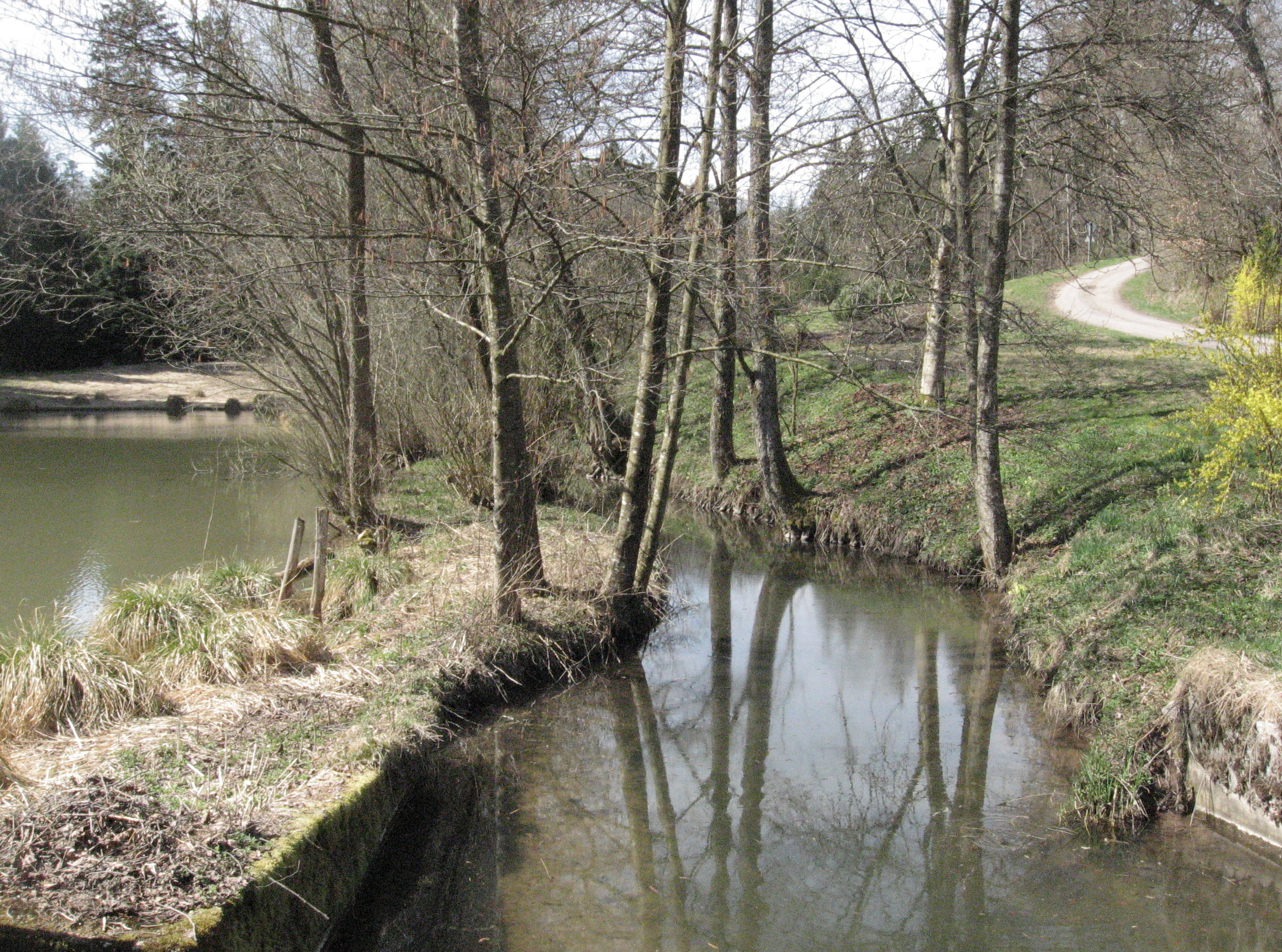
A dammed portion of the Hambach River located below the Bühlerzeller Hambachsägmühle.

The Hahnbach (German pronunciation: [ˈhaːnbax]; also: Hambach) is a river of Baden-Württemberg, Germany. It is a right tributary of the Klingenbach near Bühlerzell.

== See also ==
- List of rivers of Baden-Württemberg
