= Brettach (Kocher) =

River in Baden-Württemberg, Germany

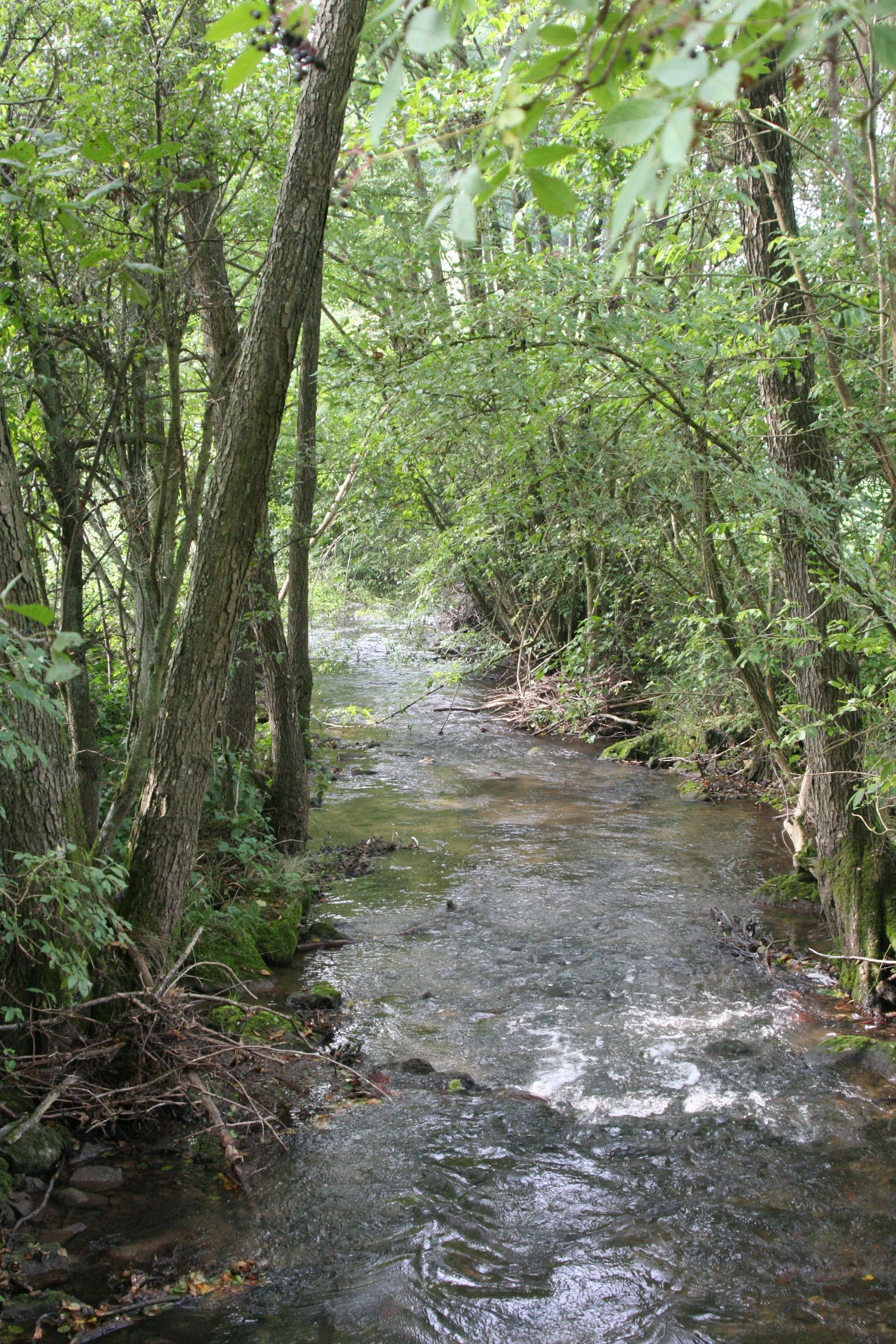
- The Brettach in Bretzfeld-Brettach

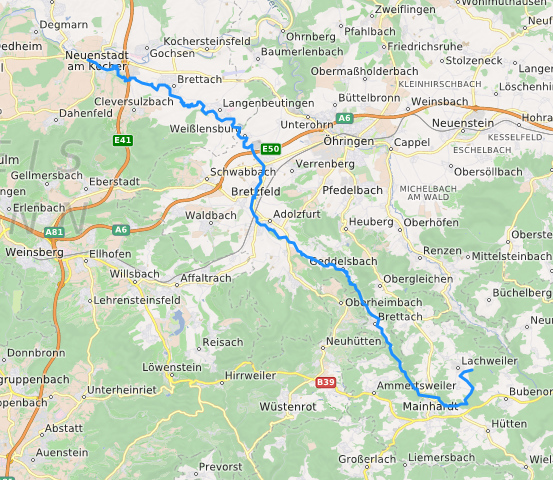
- Course of The Brettach

Location
- Country: Germany
- State: Baden-Württemberg

Physical characteristics
- Mouth
  - location: Kocher
  - coordinates: 49.2367°N 9.3239°E
- Length: 42.0 km (26.1 mi)
- Basin size: 154 km^{2} (59 sq mi)

Basin features
- Progression: Kocher→ Neckar→ Rhine→ North Sea

The Brettach is a river in Baden-Württemberg, Germany. The 42-kilometer long Brettach flows into the Kocher in Neuenstadt am Kocher.

== See also ==
- List of rivers of Baden-Württemberg
