= The Backhaus Clock =

Historically significant clock in Forchtenberg, Germany

Coordinates: 49°17′18″N 9°33′42″E

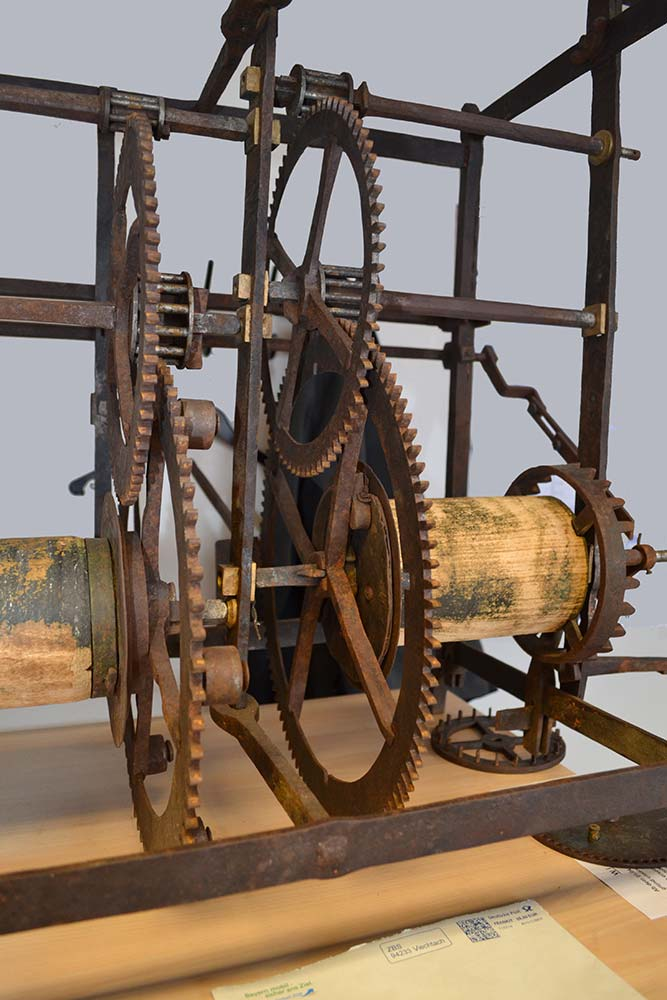
The Forchtenberg Tower Clock is the oldest dated tower clock in the world.

The Backhaus Clock, also known as the Forchtenberg Tower Clock, is a historical mechanical tower clock located in Forchtenberg, Baden-Württemberg, Germany. It is notable for the year 1463 engraved on its frame in Gothic script, which marks it as the oldest dated tower clock still in operation in the world. Unlike the contentious dating of other ancient clocks, such as the one in Salisbury Cathedral, the Forchtenberg Clock's date is clearly inscribed on the clock itself, though it remains ambiguous whether this date refers to the clock's original construction or an early repair.

== History ==
Initially, mechanical clocks equipped with a verge escapement system appeared around 1300. Major cities, like Augsburg, Vienna, and Cologne, along with Milan and Prague, were known to have striking mechanical clocks on their towers, but all, with the exception of the Prague astronomical clock, have been destroyed or lost.

The clock frame is engraved with various dates, with 1463 being the earliest, marking significant moments in the clock's history. Although these engravings have been authenticated by experts, it is unclear whether 1463 represents the original manufacturing year or a later repair date. The gothic style used for this date is consistent with that era's notation, resembling a diamond shape and found in many Southern German churches from that period.

Its construction date suggests it might have been made in Nuremberg or Strasbourg, key centers for tower clock construction in the 14th and 15th centuries. The clock was mentioned for the first time in Forchtenberg city council records in 1606 at the Fountain Gate, now known as the Bakehouse Gate. The last major repair before its decommissioning was carried out in 1878 by Forchtenberg clockmaker G. Wagner, who left his mark on the clock's frame.

== Restoration ==
Due to the need for extensive repairs, the clock was removed from its original location in Forchtenberg's historical bakehouse and placed in storage in 1978. It was rediscovered in 2012 by Rolf Krämer, the private owner of the historical bakehouse, in a municipal archive in Forchtenberg. Through the efforts of both the city of Forchtenberg and the German Foundation for Monument Protection (DSD), which provided a 30,000 Euro grant to the city, the clock was fully restored and is now in its original position on the bakehouse tower.

Before being discovered in 2012, only two dials, some pendulum weights and parts of the hand movement remained in the former clock tower. The clock's mechanical components were found in a heavily weathered but undamaged state. Thanks to the support of the German Foundation for Monument Protection, the unique timepiece was successfully restored in 2014 and is now installed again in the clock tower of the bakery.
