= Forchtenberg =

- Town
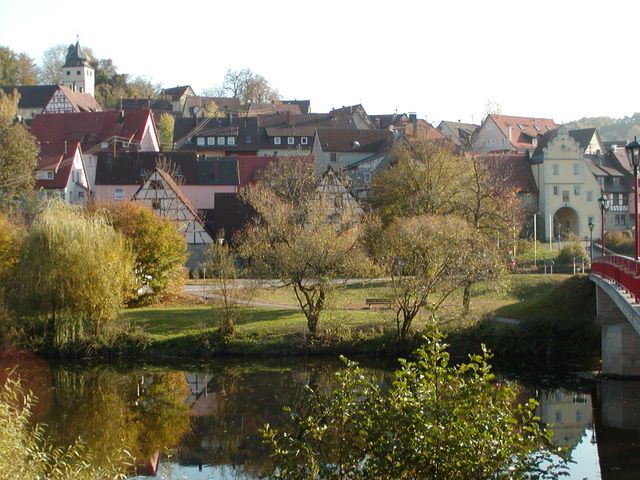

- Coat of arms

- Location of Forchtenberg within Hohenlohekreis district
- Interactive map of Forchtenberg
- Location within Germany Location within Baden-Württemberg
- Coordinates: 49°17′N 9°34′E
- Country: Germany
- State: Baden-Württemberg
- Admin. region: Stuttgart
- District: Hohenlohekreis
- Municipal assoc.: Mittleres Kochertal
- Subdivisions: 5

Government
  - Mayor (2024–32): Michael Foss (CDU)

Area
  - Total: 38.09 km^{2} (14.71 sq mi)
- Elevation: 223 m (732 ft)

Population (2025-12-31)
  - Total: 5,375
  - Density: 141.1/km^{2} (365.5/sq mi)
- Time zone: UTC+01:00 (CET)
  - Summer (DST): UTC+02:00 (CEST)
- Postal codes: 74670
- Dialling codes: 07947
- Vehicle registration: KÜN, ÖHR
- Website: www.forchtenberg.de

Forchtenberg (German pronunciation: [ˈfɔʁçtn̩bɛʁk]) is a town in the district of Hohenlohekreis, northern Baden-Württemberg. It lies on the side of a partly fortified hill overlooking the Kocher valley where the Kupfer river flows into the Kocher. The name Forchtenberg is derived from "vor dem Berg" or "before the hill" in English.

== Geography ==
Forchtenberg lies on north-facing hill overlooking the Kocher and Kupfer rivers. To the south of Forchtenberg the hills rise higher to woodland and the Hohenlohe plateau beyond. To the north runs the long Kocher valley. Opposite Forchtenberg the hills are a rich tapestry of south-facing vineyards.

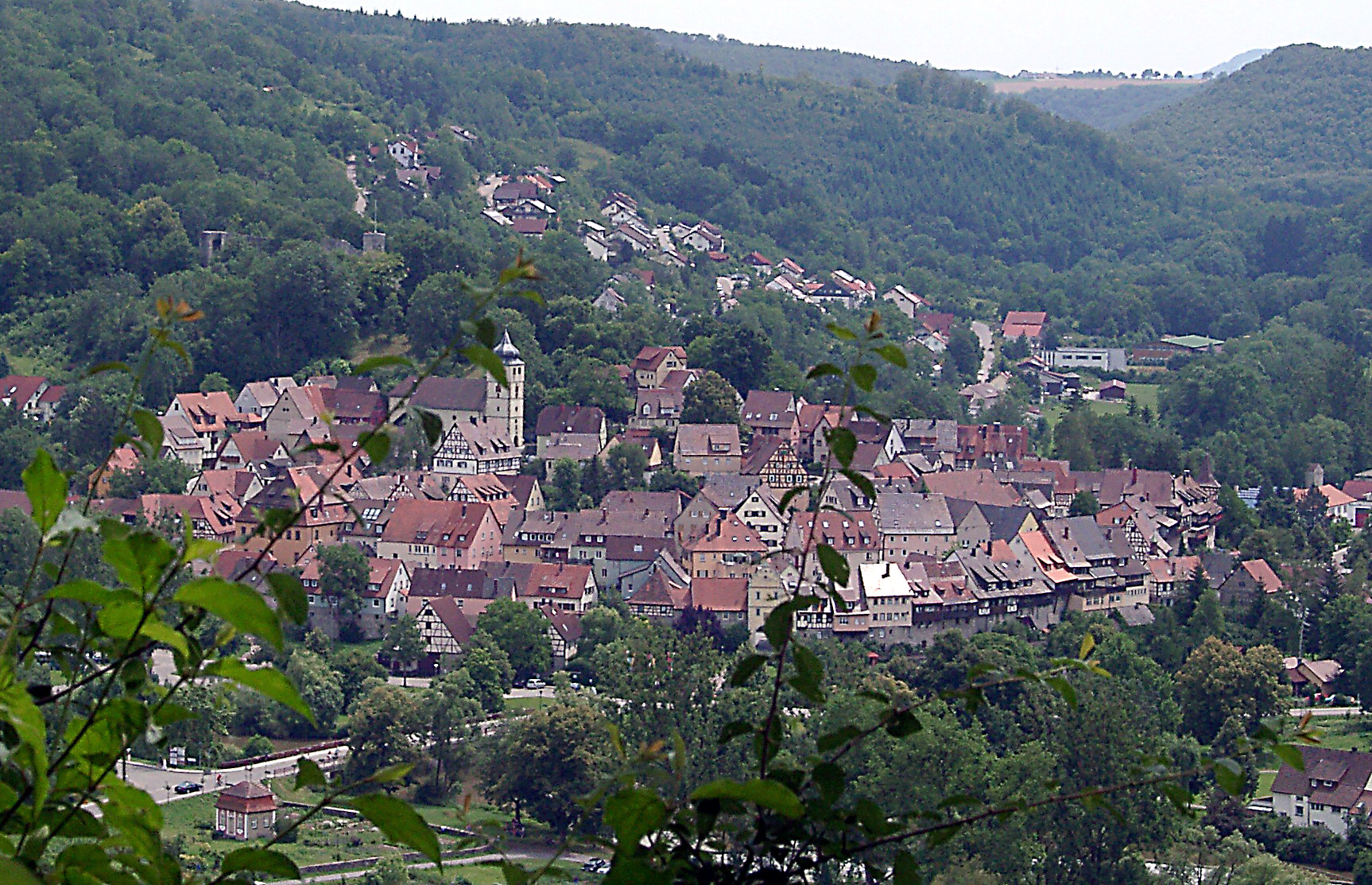
Forchtenberg viewed from the north looking south

=== Administrative districts ===
Forchtenberg encompasses a number of communities: Forchtenberg itself, Sindringen, Ernsbach, Wohlmuthausen and Muthof. A number of outlying hamlets also fall under the town of Forchtenberg: Büschelhof, Haberhof, Hohensall, Metzdorf, Neuwülfingen, Orbachshof, Rauhbusch, Schießhof, Schleierhof, Schwarzenweiler and Waldfeld.

== History ==
Forchtenberg was originally established as an offshoot from the hamlet of Wülfingen (which lies on the opposite side of the Kocher river to the hill on which Forchtenberg stands today). According to the wooden plaque found on the cemetery church in Wülfingen, like many settlements in the area near the Limes Romanus, prior to 250 AD the area around Forchtenberg housed a pagan Alemani community. The original Christian church in the old valley site dated back to 536 AD when the settlement fell into the hands of the Franks.

Forchtenberg itself was first mentioned in records in 1298, some 70 years after Count Konrad von Dürn established a fortress on the same hill. The people in Wülfingen, weary of constant flooding from the Kocher river, established the town of Forchtenberg under the fortress on the hill where it stands today. After this, the Valley Church served mainly as a cemetery, as is still the case to this very day. The name Forchtenberg is derived from "vor dem Berg" or "before the hill" in English. On the death of the Count of Dürn the town was reallocated to territory of Hohenlohe. Later, as a result of German Mediatisation, Hohenlohe territories became part of the kingdom of Württemberg. Forchtenberg was allocated to the Oberamt or higher court of Öhringen, which became the District of Öhringen in 1938.

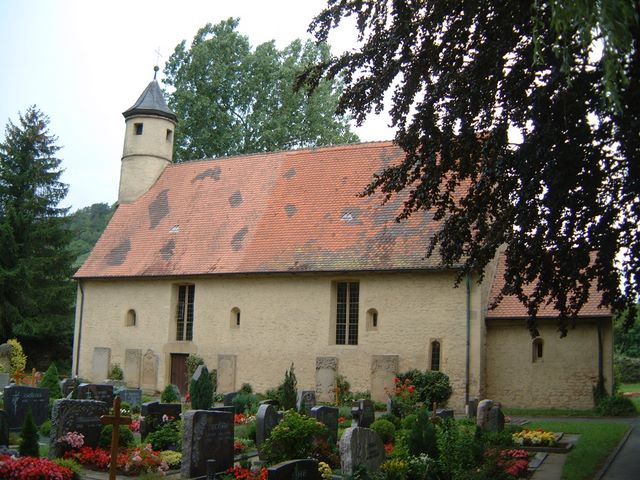
The ancient Church in Wülfingen, former home to the community of Forchtenberg

Medieval trade and peddling of wine, hides and related wares were fostered by the presence of the Kocher river which is believed also to have linked into ancient trading routes extending as far as Nuremberg in the east and Neuenstadt and Heidelberg in the west. Regional development was promoted further in 1926 when the first railway was built along the Kocher valley, for the first time connecting Forchtenberg directly to Waldenburg (Württemberg) and beyond. As a result, there was a sharp rise in local business. Kreisreform (county boundary reforms) in 1972 moved Forchtenberg back under the jurisdiction of the new Hohenlohe district.

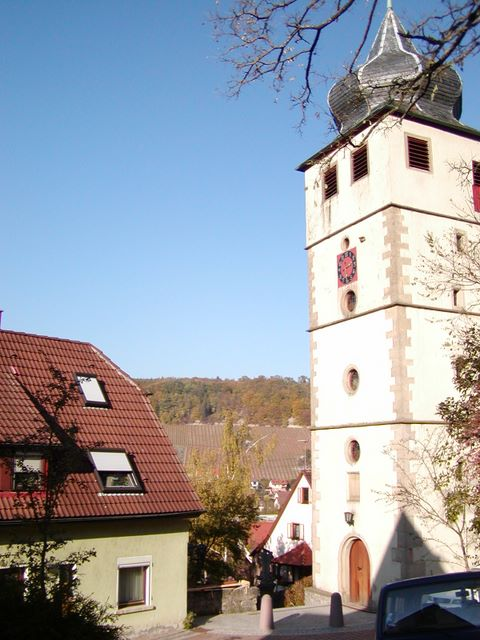
The new church in Forchtenberg

In 1981 the railway was dismantled. In the years that followed, the track was gravelled over. It is now a popular cycling route used by tourists of all ages in the summer months.

=== Districts ===
==== Sindringen ====
Sindringen was first mentioned in records in 1323 when the rulers of Weinsberg awarded the community the status of a town. Although the Reformation had already taken effect before this time in the area, the town returned to the Catholic line of Hohenlohe-Waldenburg-Bartenstein. Despite this, the people of Sindringen remained loyal to the Protestant confession, mainly due to outside military support.

== Politics ==
=== Mayors ===
- Circa mid 18th century Johanns Georg Matheus Haag
- Circa 1810 Village Mayor Haag
- Circa 1820–1837 von Olnhausen
- 1837–1847 Schall (notary)
- 1847–1860 Ludwig Blanck
- 1860–1872 Walther (notary)
- 1872–1876 Karl Krauß
- 1876–1892 Karl Böhringer
- 1892–1900 Paul Hüzel
- 1900–1906 Christian Wirth
- 1906–1919 Hermann Hörer

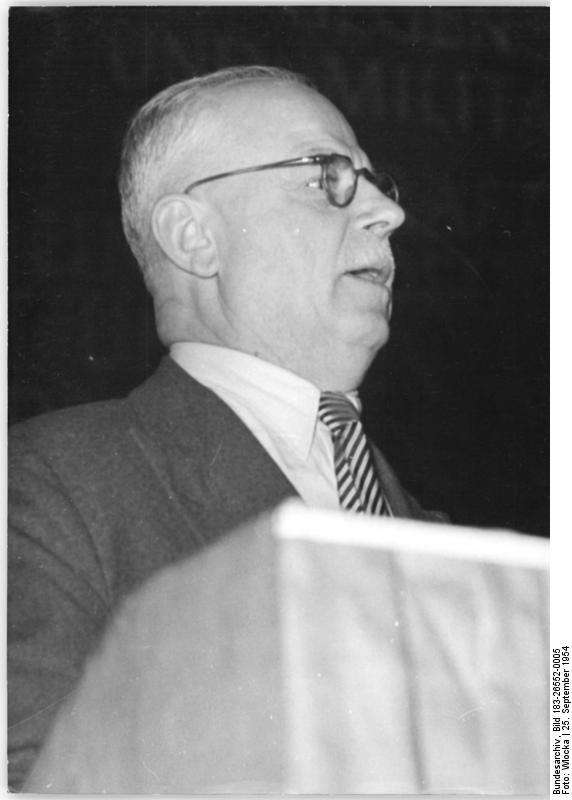
Robert Scholl in Weimar at the 1954 CDU Party convention

- 1919–1930 Robert Scholl
- 1930–1933 Friedrich Kramer
- 1933–1936 Eugen Maurer
- 1936–1945 Adolf Hebeiß (represented 1942–1945 by Richard Leitlein)
- 1946–1948 Wilhelm Wolf
- 1948-1948 Friedrich Haag
- 1948–1966 Adolf Hebeiß
- 1966–2004 Martin Tuffentsammer
- 2004–2016 Uwe Gysin
- 2016-today Michael Foss

On his retirement in 2004, Martin Tuffentsammer was the longest-serving mayor in South Germany.

=== Coat of arms ===
The coat of arms depicts the silver, winged, armoured character of Michael (archangel) slaying the silver dragon.

== Economy and infrastructure ==
Forchtenberg is a traditional wine-growing area within the Kocherberg region of Kocher-Jagst-Tauber.

=== Transportation ===
Forchtenberg's main connection to neighbouring communities is provided by the Kocher valley road which runs East to West. A regular bus services runs between Forchtenberg, its outlying communities and the towns of Öhringen and Künzelsau.

=== Schools in Forchtenberg ===
There is a Primary School Grundschule and Senior School Hauptschule in Forchtenberg. In the district of Ernsbach there is an independent primary school.

There are Kindergartens in Forchtenberg itself as well as Sindringen and Ernsbach.

=== Sport and leisure ===
Forchtenberg, Ernsbach and Sindringen all have their own sports halls and community centres. The old gymnastics halls in Forchtenberg and Sindringen are supported by an active sports clubs which organise regular tournaments and events.

== People, culture and architecture ==
A number of cultural events take place every year in the 'Ernsbacher Kelter' with the backing of the local town council. To a certain degree the Ernsbacher Kelter has developed in recent years into a default community centre.

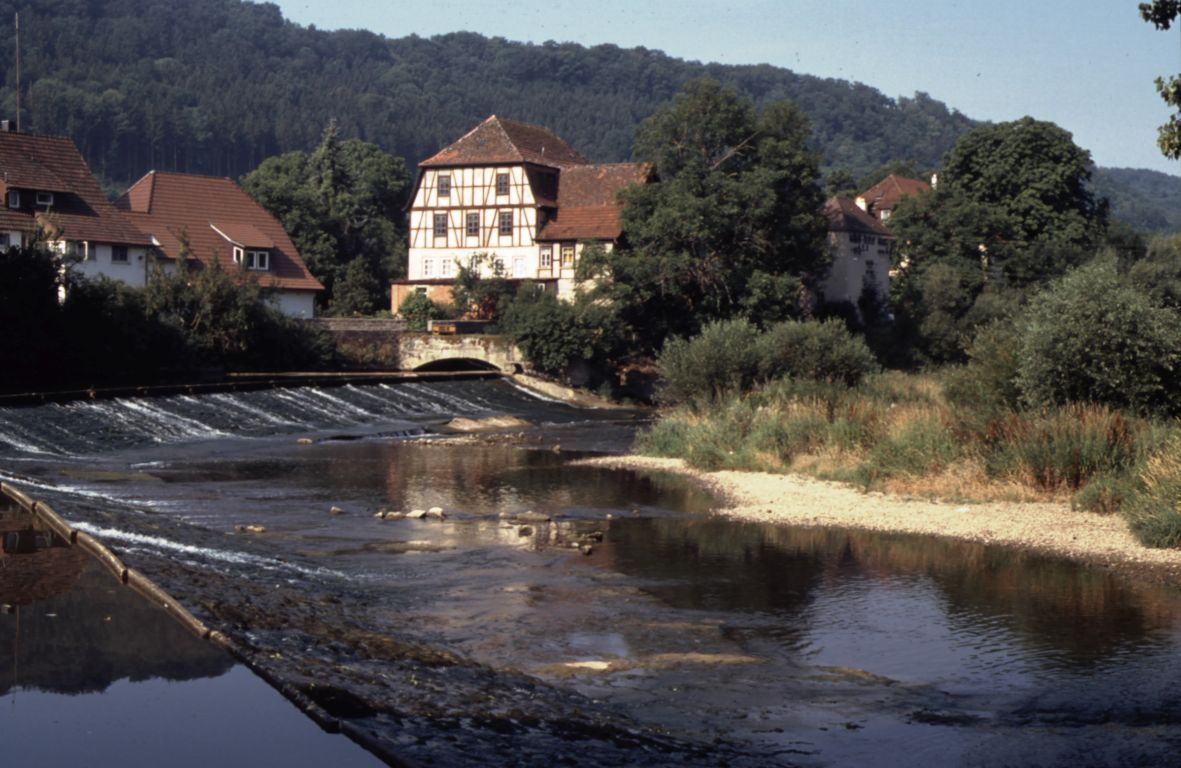
The Kocher weir in front of the mill and Leitlein waterworks

=== Museums ===
The building housing the Kern Haus historical museum in Forchtenberg dates back to 1370. For 3 generations it was home to the Kern family of artists. It subsequently provided working premises for local stonemasons and sculptors who mined stones from the local hills to sculpt statues for the surrounding region. The museum also documents the life and times of Hans and Sophie Scholl.

=== Local architecture ===
The centre of Forchtenberg dates back to the Middle Ages surrounded by partially intact, partially renovated fortifications. This includes the Town Hall which was home to many local dignitaries including the Scholl family. Forchtenberg is also home to possibly the oldest dated tower clock still in operation in the world, The Backhaus Clock. Over the old town lie the ruins of the old fortress, including a large vaulted cellar. Down the valley from the old town stands the former gypsum quarry. The entire old town of Forchtenberg is subject to a preservation order which also extends to the ruined fortress on the hill and the Valley Church cemetery. Sindringen also boasts many buildings dating back to the Middle Ages with partially renovated town walls. The Town Mill in Sindringen and Sindringen Castle (which is now in private ownership) are also popular tourist spots.

=== Regular events ===
- Forchtenberg old town is home to an annual mediaeval Christmas market on every first weekend of Advent.
- In May every year Sindringen is home to a large pottery market which is attended by potters from all over Europe.
- Every July the Christian Rock in the Ruins Openair Festival takes place in the old hill ruins.
- At the end of July/beginning of August the old hill ruins are home to an open-air cinema.

== Famous people from Forchtenberg ==
- Leonhard Kern (1588–1662) German sculptor
- Johann (later John) Christian Wohlmann (1745–1825, London-based gold and silver refiner, forebear of more than 11 generations of descendants living all over the world, including the British Isles, USA, Germany and Australia.
- Robert Gradmann (1865–1950) German botanist

=== The Scholl family ===
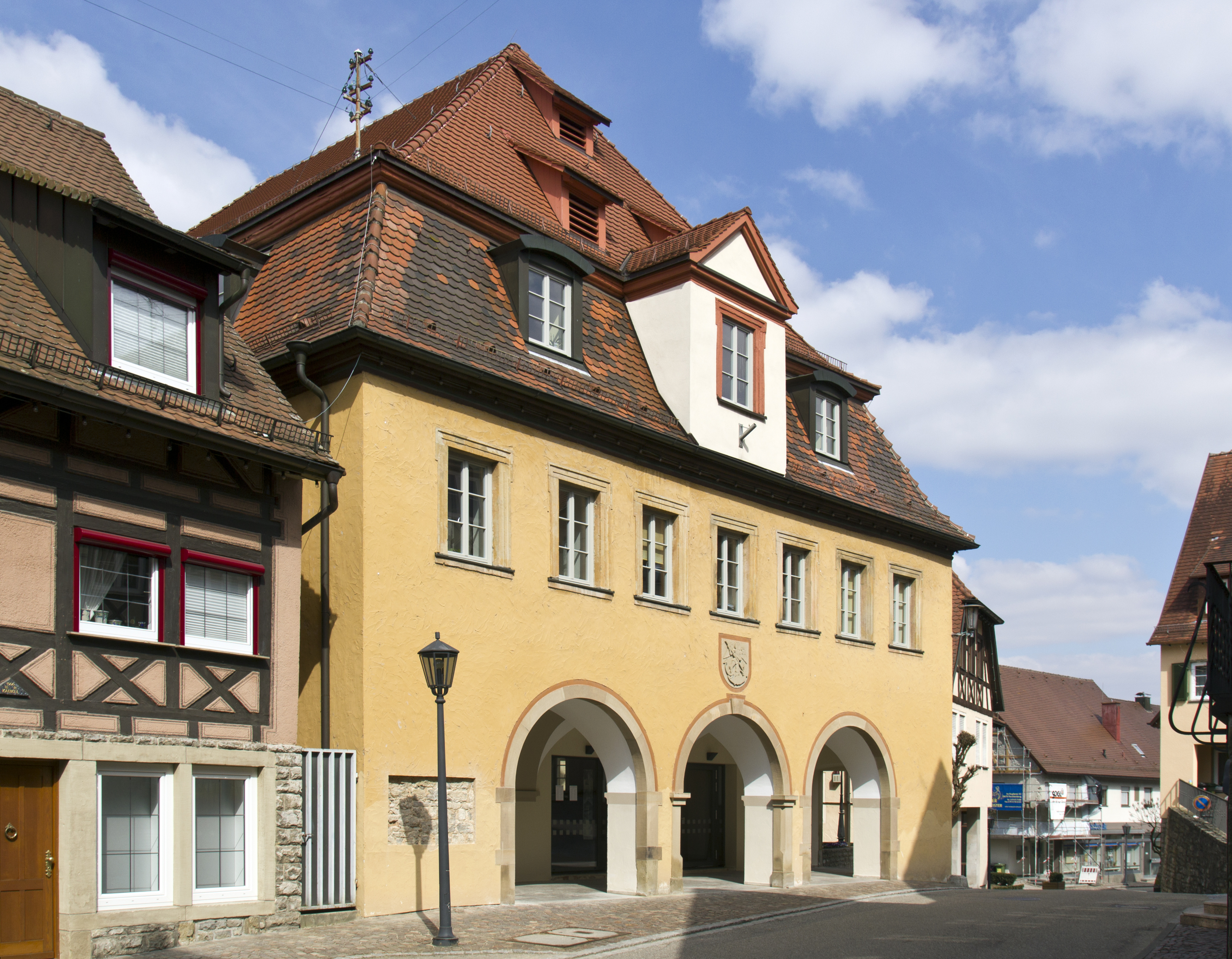
The Town Hall in Forchtenberg, traditional home to each burgomaster and the birthplace of Sophie Scholl

- Sophie Scholl, important member of the German White Rose resistance movement. Born 9 May 1921, executed by the Nazis on 22 February 1943 in Munich.
- Hans Scholl, important member of the German White Rose resistance movement. Born in Ingersheim 22 September 1918, also executed by the Nazis on 22 February 1943 in Munich.

The father of Hans and Sophie Scholl, Robert Scholl, served as mayor in Forchtenberg from 1919 to 1929 where both children spent most of their childhood.

== Twin cities ==
- Szigethalom, Hungary, since 1992

== See also ==
- The Backhaus Clock
