= Orlacher Bach =

Location
- Country: Germany
- State: Baden-Württemberg

Physical characteristics
- Mouth
  - location: Kocher
  - coordinates: 49.1979°N 9.7914°E
- Length: 4.6 km (2.9 mi)

Basin features
- Progression: Kocher→ Neckar→ Rhine→ North Sea

The Orlacher Bach is a stream in Baden-Württemberg, Germany. It is a tributary of the Kocher and is 4.6 kilometres (2.9 mi) long. It is named for the small village of Orlach, which sits high above it. The stream begins about a kilometer WSW of the village of Nesselbach.

Extreme weather led to the stream overflowing its banks on May 29, 2016, contributing to considerable damage to the town of Braunsbach.
