= Braunsbach =

- Municipality
- Coat of arms

- Location of Braunsbach within Schwäbisch Hall district
- Interactive map of Braunsbach
- Location within Germany Location within Baden-Württemberg
- Coordinates: 49°11′56″N 09°47′29″E
- Country: Germany
- State: Baden-Württemberg
- Admin. region: Stuttgart
- District: Schwäbisch Hall

Government
  - Mayor (2024–32): David Hägele

Area
  - Total: 52.85 km^{2} (20.41 sq mi)
- Elevation: 268 m (879 ft)

Population (2025-12-31)
  - Total: 2,462
  - Density: 46.58/km^{2} (120.7/sq mi)
- Time zone: UTC+01:00 (CET)
  - Summer (DST): UTC+02:00 (CEST)
- Postal codes: 74542
- Dialling codes: 07906
- Vehicle registration: SHA
- Website: www.braunsbach.de

Braunsbach is a municipality in the district of Schwäbisch Hall in Baden-Württemberg in Germany. It is on the Kocher river, about 15 kilometres (9.3 mi) from the district seat of Schwäbisch Hall. The town is bordered to the north by the town Künzelsau, the county seat of Hohenlohe, in the east by the town of Langenburg, on the southeast by Wolpertshausen, in the south by the town of Schwäbisch Hall, in the southwest by Untermünkheim and in the west by Kupferzell in Hohenlohe.

== History ==
Braunsbach was formed in February 1972 by the voluntary merger of the formerly independent communities of Arnsdorf, Braunsbach, Döttingen, Geislingen am Kocher, Jungholzhausen, Orlach and Steinkirchen.

In late May 2016, severe weather led to flooding of the Orlacher Bach and Schlossbach within 3 hours that strewed rubble across the town, causing extensive damage but no casualties.

== Points of interest ==
- Schloss Braunsbach (Braunsbach Castle), in part built in 1250
- Protestant church in the castle
- Döttingen Gate Braunsbach (rest of the wall surrounding the village)
- Burg Tierberg (Tierberg Castle), 13th century, former hunting lodge of the princes of Hohenlohe
- Schloss Döttingen (Döttingen Castle) (built in the 16th century), now hotel and restaurant
- House of the former Mayor J. M. Gronbach in Orlach (now House Schumm) known for the story "Das Mädchen von Orlach" ("The Girl from Orlach")
- Kocher Viaduct near Geislingen (largest reinforced concrete bridge in Europe 1128 m long and 185 m high)
- Bridge Museum in Geislingen
- Rabbinate Museum Braunsbach
- Nature reserve "Grimm brook mouth"
- Hall of the Land of Castles (local name: Burgenlandhalle) Braunsbach (in part former synagogue)
- Jewish cemetery in Braunsbach

== The Girl from Orlach ==
"The Girl from Orlach" is a ghost story of the Biedermeier whose protagonist, Magdalena Gronbach, allegedly was capable of extrasensory perception. In February 1831 a white ghost of a woman appeared to her several times. Always when she appeared, a small fire broke out in the house. She said she was the Cistercian nun Mariane Susanne from Orlach who had been born just as Magdalena on September 12, but not in 1812, but precisely 400 years before that, i.e. in 1412. She implored salvation from Magdalena, and when Magdalena wanted to know which reward she would receive she replied: "Do not lay up treasures on earth!" In early June of the same year the ghost of a Capuchin friar appeared to her in the form of a dark menacing black shadow. She fell into a trance and in this state answered all questions she was asked. Thereupon many people came from all over the country to ask for advice regarding what would happen in the future. After having observed Magdalena for five weeks the chief medical officer Justinus Kerner concluded that this was a "state of possession."

== See also ==
- Jungholzhausen massacre
