= Eisbach (Kocher) =

River in Baden-Württemberg, Germany

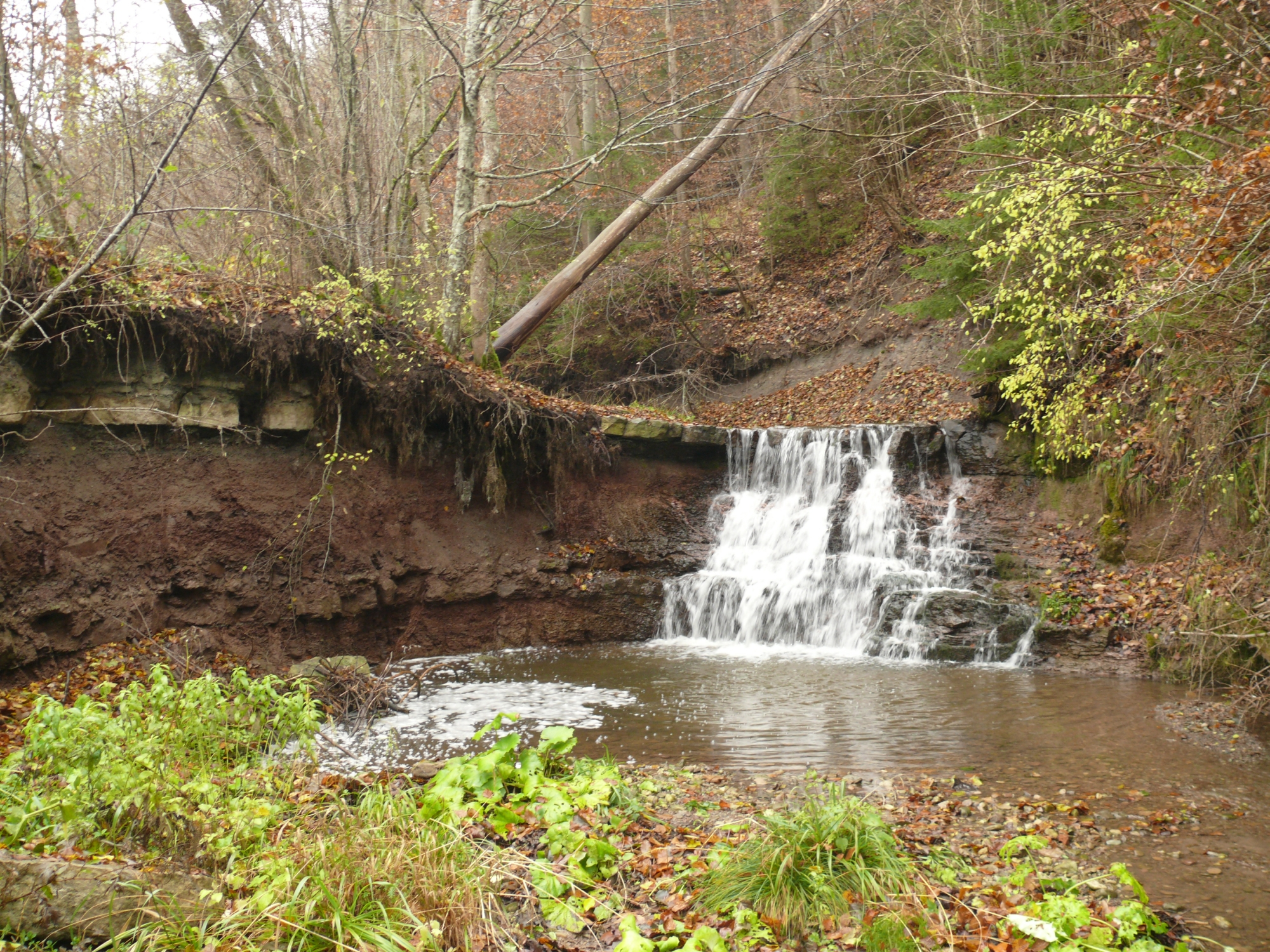
- A small waterfall in the Eisbach, NNW of Sulzbach-Laufen.

Location
- Country: Germany
- State: Baden-Württemberg

Physical characteristics
- Mouth
  - location: Kocher
  - coordinates: 48.9614°N 9.8467°E

Basin features
- Progression: Kocher→ Neckar→ Rhine→ North Sea
- Tributaries
  - left: Irsbach
  - right: Pfannenbach

The Eisbach (German pronunciation: [ˈaɪsbax]) is a river of Baden-Württemberg, Germany. It flows into the Kocher in Sulzbach-Laufen.

== See also ==
- List of rivers of Baden-Württemberg
