= Adelbach =

River in Germany

- Mouth of the Adelbach

Location
- Country: Germany
- State: Baden-Württemberg

Physical characteristics
- Mouth
  - location: Kocher
  - coordinates: 49.0324°N 9.7546°E

Basin features
- Progression: Kocher→ Neckar→ Rhine→ North Sea

The Adelbach is a river in Baden-Württemberg, Germany. It is 4.8 km (3.0 mi) long and flows into the Kocher near Rosengarten.

== See also ==
- List of rivers of Baden-Württemberg
