= Jungholzhausen massacre =

April 1945 US war crime in Germany

- Locations of Braunsbach and Ilshofen in the German state of Baden-Württemberg
- Location: Braunsbach and Ilshofen, Württemberg, Germany
- Date: 14–15 April 1945
- Attack type: Massacre
- Deaths: 13–30 Waffen-SS and Wehrmacht prisoners of war
- Perpetrators: 254th Infantry Regiment, 63rd Infantry Division (US Army)

The Jungholzhausen massacre is a war crime committed by the 63rd Infantry Division of the US Army on 15 April 1945 during the Western Allied invasion of Germany. Between 13 and 30 Waffen-SS and Wehrmacht prisoners of war were executed by the division's 254th Infantry Regiment after heavy fighting near the village of Jungholzhausen.

== Massacre ==
In April 1945, the 254th Infantry Regiment suffered heavy casualties during the battle for the Hohenlohe district. Wehrmacht combat engineers and mostly 17-year old Waffen-SS soldiers from Leoben in Styria engaged the regiment in combat near the village of Jungholzhausen. After the battle, the villagers counted the bodies of 63 German soldiers, out of whom at least 13 had been killed after surrendering. An eyewitness observed the US execution with submachine guns of four Waffen-SS troops during the night. According to Harald Zigan, US massacres of German prisoners of war were commonplace in the district of Hohenlohe.

== Legacy and 1996 US investigation ==
According to German historian Klaus-Dietmar Henke, the war crimes committed by the US in Germany in 1945 were largely shrouded in silence until the 1990s, when German local newspapers began reporting on them. In 1996, the United States Army Criminal Investigation Command investigated the massacre of 15 April 1945 in Braunsbach-Jungholzhausen but could not identify the perpetrators of the massacre.

== See also ==
- List of massacres in Germany
- United States war crimes

== Sources ==
- Henke, Klaus-Dietmar (1996). Die amerikanische Besetzung Deutschlands [The American occupation of Germany] (in German). Munich: R. Oldenbourg Verlag. ISBN 3-486-56175-8.
- Antrag der Fraktion Die Republikaner und Stellungnahme des Innenministeriums: US-Kriegsverbrechen in Südwestdeutschland [Motion of the Parliamentary Group The Republicans and Statement of the Ministry of the Interior: US War Crimes in Southwest Germany] (PDF) (Report) (in German). Landtag von Baden-Württemberg. 25 March 1997. Drucksache 12/991.
- Windisch, Erik (17 May 2023). "Kämpfe um Schwäbisch Hall im April 1945" [Battles for Schwäbisch Hall in April 1945]. Württembergisch Franken (in German). 84: 289–353. doi:10.53458/wfr.v84i.5627.
- Zigan, Harald (16 April 2015). "Kriegsende 1945 (Teil 10): US-Soldaten nehmen blutige Rache in Jungholzhausen und Ilshofen" [End of war 1945 (Part 10): US soldiers take bloody revenge in Jungholzhausen and Ilshofen]. Südwest Presse (in German). Archived from the original on 6 March 2019. "Soldaten der Wehrmacht werden im April 1945 gefangen genommen. In mehreren hohenlohischen Dörfern erschießen US-Einheiten vor allem Angehörige der Waffen-SS, obwohl sie sich bereits ergeben haben. (transl. Soldiers of the Wehrmacht are captured in April 1945. In several Hohenloh villages, US units shoot mainly members of the Waffen-SS, despite having already surrendered.)"
