= Alemani =

Alemani is a surname. Notable people with the surname include:

- Cecilia Alemani (born 1977), Italian curator
- Gaetano Alemani (1728–1782), Italian painter

== See also ==
- Alemanni
