= Aschbach =

Aschbach may refer to:

== People ==
- Alexander Äschbach (born 1974), Swiss cyclist
- Joseph Aschbach (1801–1882), German historian

== Places ==
- Aschbach, Bas-Rhin, France
- Aschbach, Rhineland-Palatinate, Germany
- Aschbach-Markt, Austria

== Rivers ==
- Aschbach (Wern), Lower Franconia, Bavaria, Germany, tributary of the Wern

== See also ==
- Haschbach am Remigiusberg
