= Rötenbach (Kocher) =

River in Germany

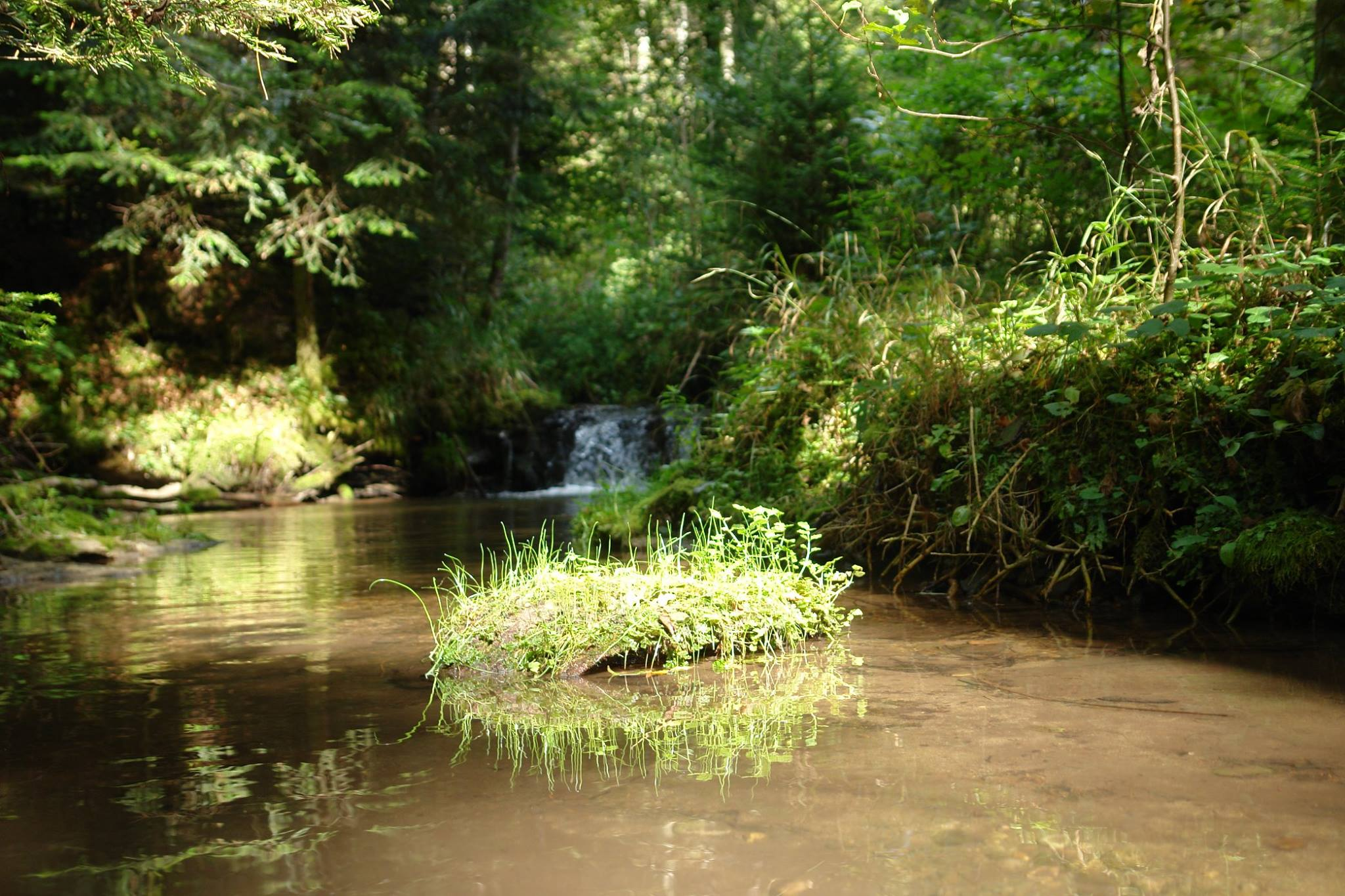

Location
- Country: Germany
- States: Baden-Württemberg

Physical characteristics
- Mouth
  - location: Kocher
  - coordinates: 48.9127°N 9.9132°E

Basin features
- Progression: Kocher→ Neckar→ Rhine→ North Sea

The Rötenbach is a river of Baden-Württemberg, Germany. It flows into the Kocher near Obergröningen.

== See also ==
- List of rivers of Baden-Württemberg
