= Kupfer (river) =

River in Germany

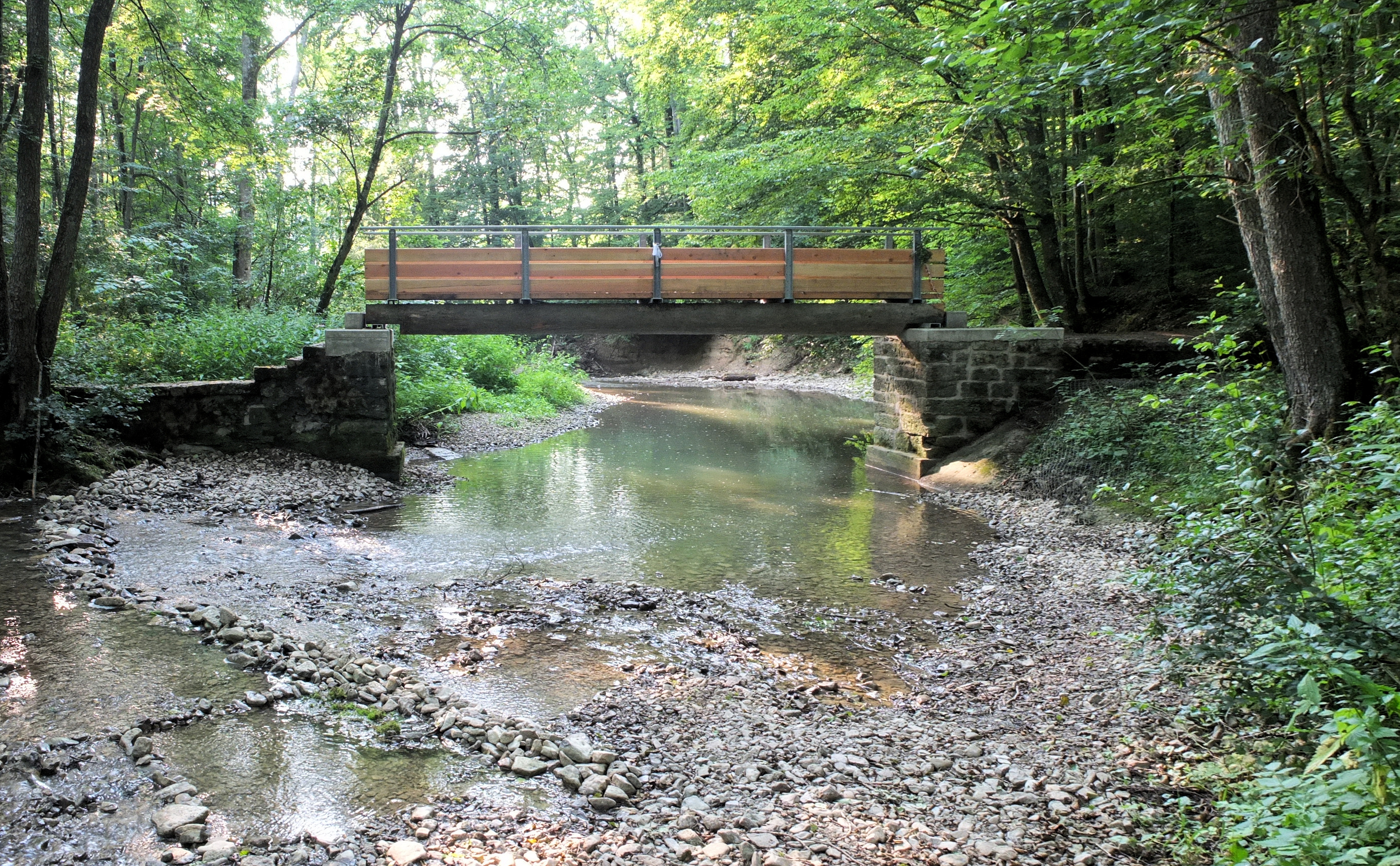

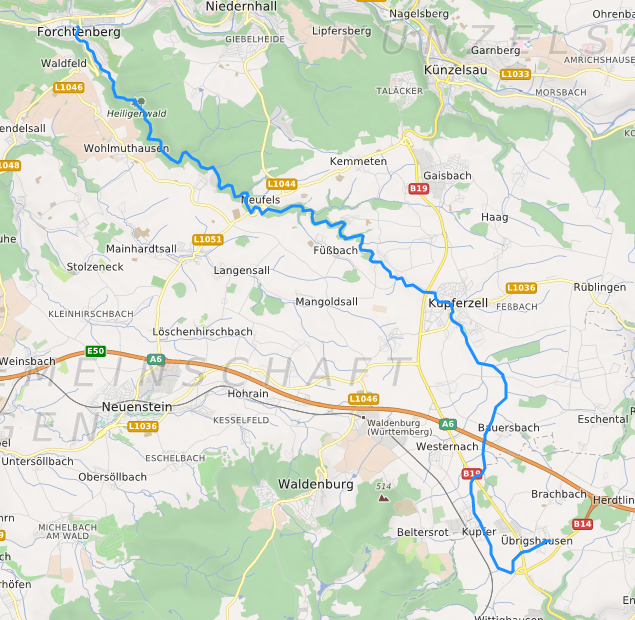
- Course of the Kupfer (interactive map)

Location
- Country: Germany
- State: Baden-Württemberg

Physical characteristics
- Mouth
  - location: Kocher
  - coordinates: 49.2901°N 9.5607°E
- Length: 25.9 km (16.1 mi)

Basin features
- Progression: Kocher→ Neckar→ Rhine→ North Sea

The Kupfer (German pronunciation: [ˈkʊpfɐ]) is a river of Baden-Württemberg, Germany. It flows into the Kocher in Forchtenberg.

== See also ==
- List of rivers of Baden-Württemberg
