= Rombach (Aal) =

River in Baden-Württemberg, Germany

Location
- Country: Germany
- States: Baden-Württemberg

Physical characteristics
- Mouth
  - location: Aal
  - coordinates: 48.8311°N 10.0736°E

Basin features
- Progression: Aal→ Kocher→ Neckar→ Rhine→ North Sea

The Rombach (in its upper course: Windwiesenbach, a part also Nesselbach) is a river of Baden-Württemberg, Germany. At its confluence with the Sauerbach west of Aalen, the Aal is formed.

== See also ==
- List of rivers of Baden-Württemberg
