= Bibers =

River in Germany

- The Bibers 200 metres before its mouth, viewing upstream

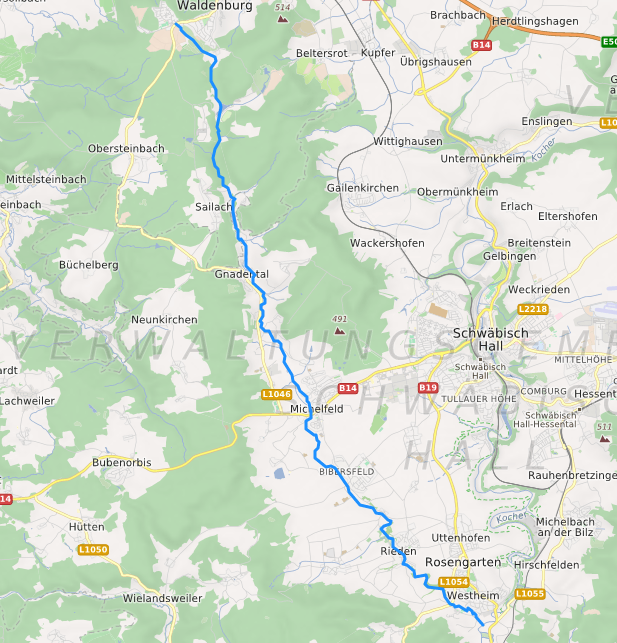
- Course of the Bibers

Location
- Country: Germany
- State: Baden-Württemberg

Physical characteristics
- Mouth
  - location: Kocher
  - coordinates: 49.0486°N 9.7341°E
- Length: 21.5 km (13.4 mi)

Basin features
- Progression: Kocher→ Neckar→ Rhine→ North Sea

The Bibers (German pronunciation: [ˈbiːbɐs]) is a river in Baden-Württemberg, Germany. The 21.5 kilometers long Bibers flows into the Kocher in Rosengarten.

== See also ==
- List of rivers of Baden-Württemberg
