= Ohrn =

River in Germany

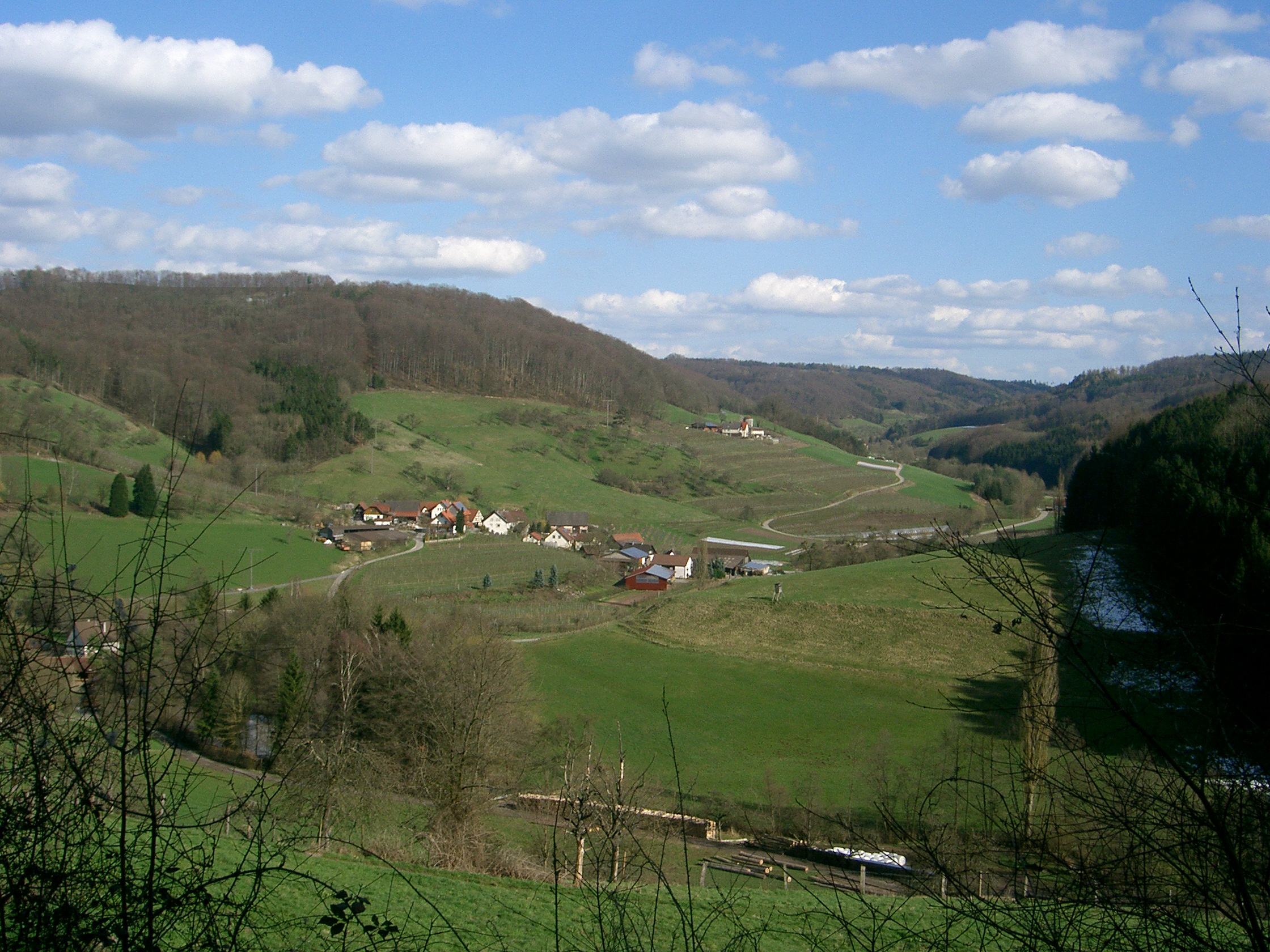
- The upper Ohrn Valley with a view of Floßholz and Schuppach

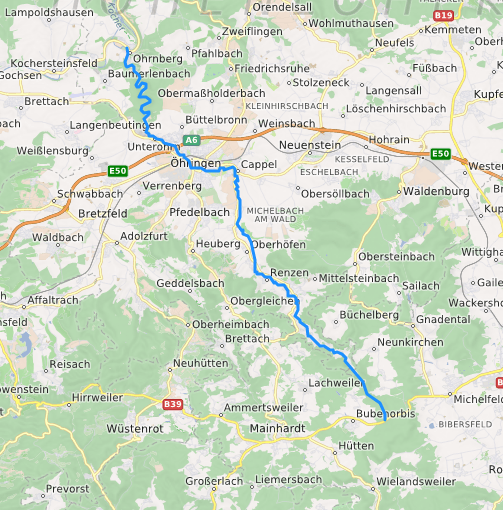
- Course of the river Ohrn

Location
- Country: Germany
- State: Baden-Württemberg

Physical characteristics
- Mouth
  - location: Kocher
  - coordinates: 49.25°N 9.35°E
- Length: 32.9 km (20.4 mi)

Basin features
- Progression: Kocher→ Neckar→ Rhine→ North Sea

The Ohrn is a river of Baden-Württemberg, Germany. It is a left tributary of the Kocher near Öhringen.

== See also ==
- List of rivers of Baden-Württemberg
