= Aal (Kocher) =

River in Germany

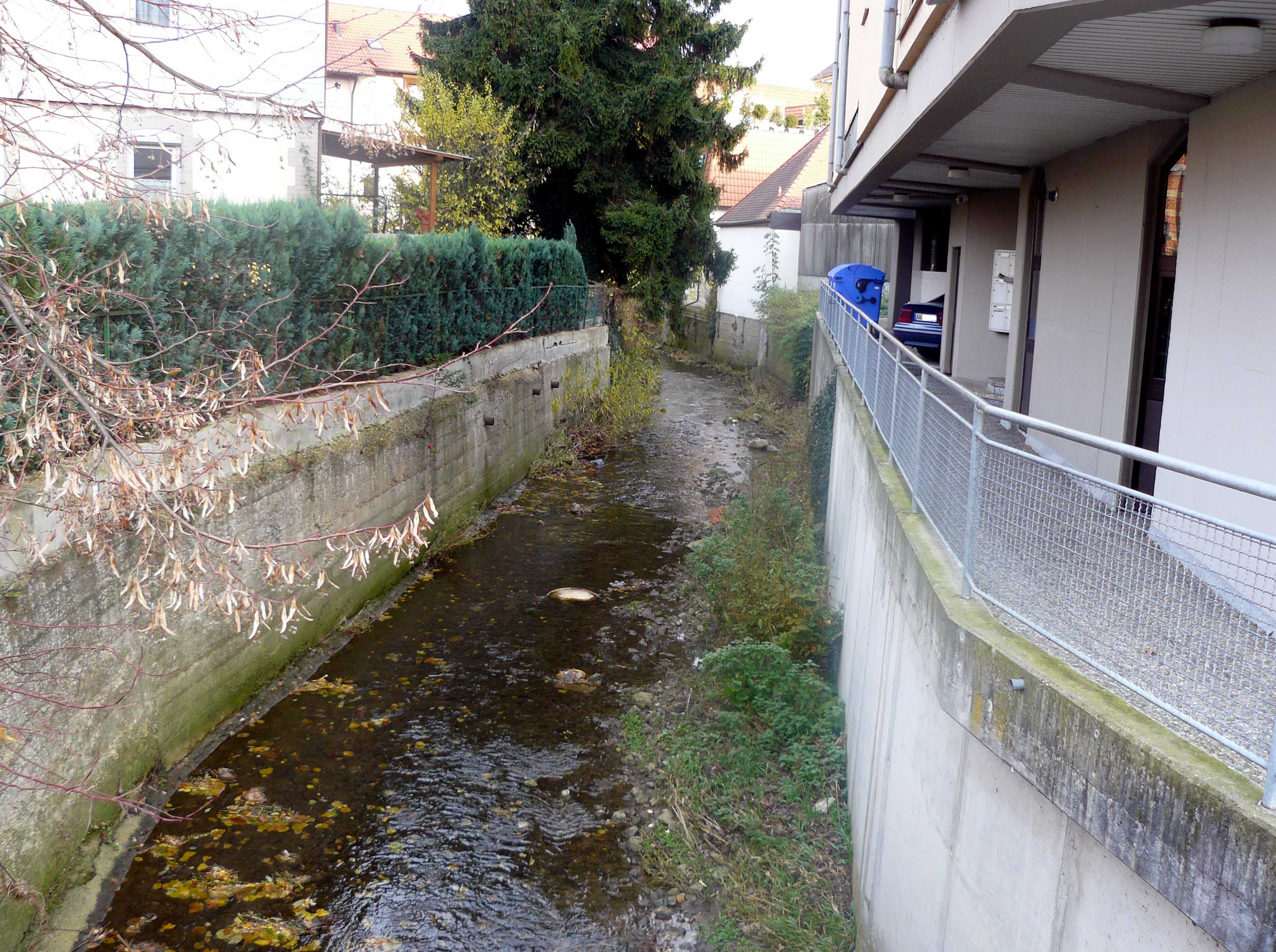
- The Aal in Aalen, about 150 metres before its mouth

- Mouth

Location
- Country: Germany
- State: Baden-Württemberg

Physical characteristics
- Mouth
  - location: Kocher
  - coordinates: 48.8377°N 10.0906°E

Basin features
- Progression: Kocher→ Neckar→ Rhine→ North Sea

The Aal is a small river in the town of Aalen in Baden-Württemberg, Germany. It originates in the Dürrwiesen near the road bridge of the K 3326 at the western end of the street Gartenstraße through the confluence of the left Rombach and the right Sauerbach, that slightly exceeds the Rombach in length and area of basin. From here, the Aal first flows in an eastern and later northeastern direction. After 1.6 km, it flows on the left side of the Reichstädter Markt into the Kocher.

For the Ancient Romans, the Aal was the reason to erect the Aalen Castle somewhat north of it, its largest equestrian fort north of the Alps. They extracted up to 30,000 liters of water daily for their approximately 1,000 horses.

At the confluence of the Rombach and Sauerbach, the Aal was recultivated for 5 million euros, and on September 10, 2010 the newly constructed Dürrwiesen flood retention basin was inaugurated.

== Tributaries ==
- Rombach, left headwater, 5.8 km from the mouth most distant source, and 12.1 km².

It is considered the main headwater, the name officially used also for the total course of the Aal.

- Sauerbach right headwaters, 6.5 km from the mouth most distant source and 12.9 km².
- Heuchelbach, from the right near the street Fackelbrückenstraße, 1.5 km and 1.1 km².

== See also ==
- List of rivers of Baden-Württemberg
