= Rot (Kocher) =

River in Baden-Württemberg, Germany

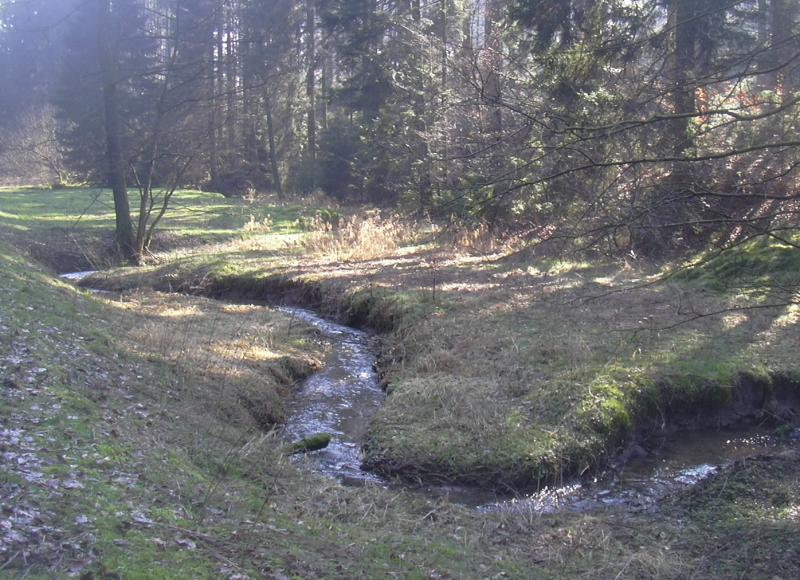
- Meandering course of the Fichtenberger Rot.

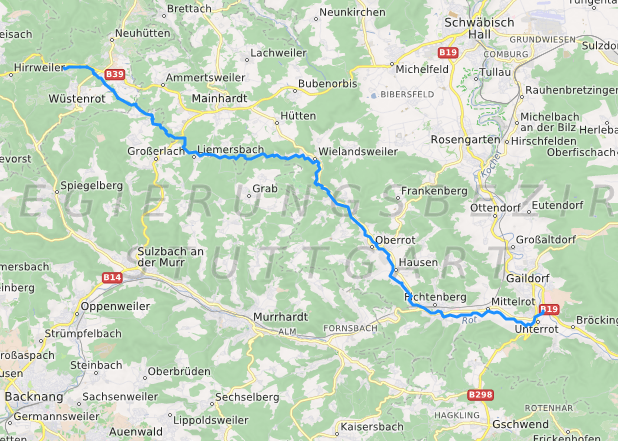

Location
- Country: Germany
- State: Baden-Württemberg

Physical characteristics
- Mouth
  - location: Kocher
  - coordinates: 48.9855°N 9.7809°E
- Length: 37.3 km (23.2 mi)
- Basin size: 137 km^{2} (53 sq mi)

Basin features
- Progression: Kocher→ Neckar→ Rhine→ North Sea

The Rot (German pronunciation: [ʁoːt]) is a river of Baden-Württemberg, Germany. It is a left tributary of the Kocher. In order to distinguish it from other similarly named rivers (some of then flowing quite nearby), the Rot is sometimes also called Fichtenberger Rot. Its source is near Wüstenrot. It passes through Oberrot, Fichtenberg and Unterrot, and flows into the Kocher near Gaildorf.

== See also ==
- List of rivers of Baden-Württemberg
