= Kocher =

River in Germany

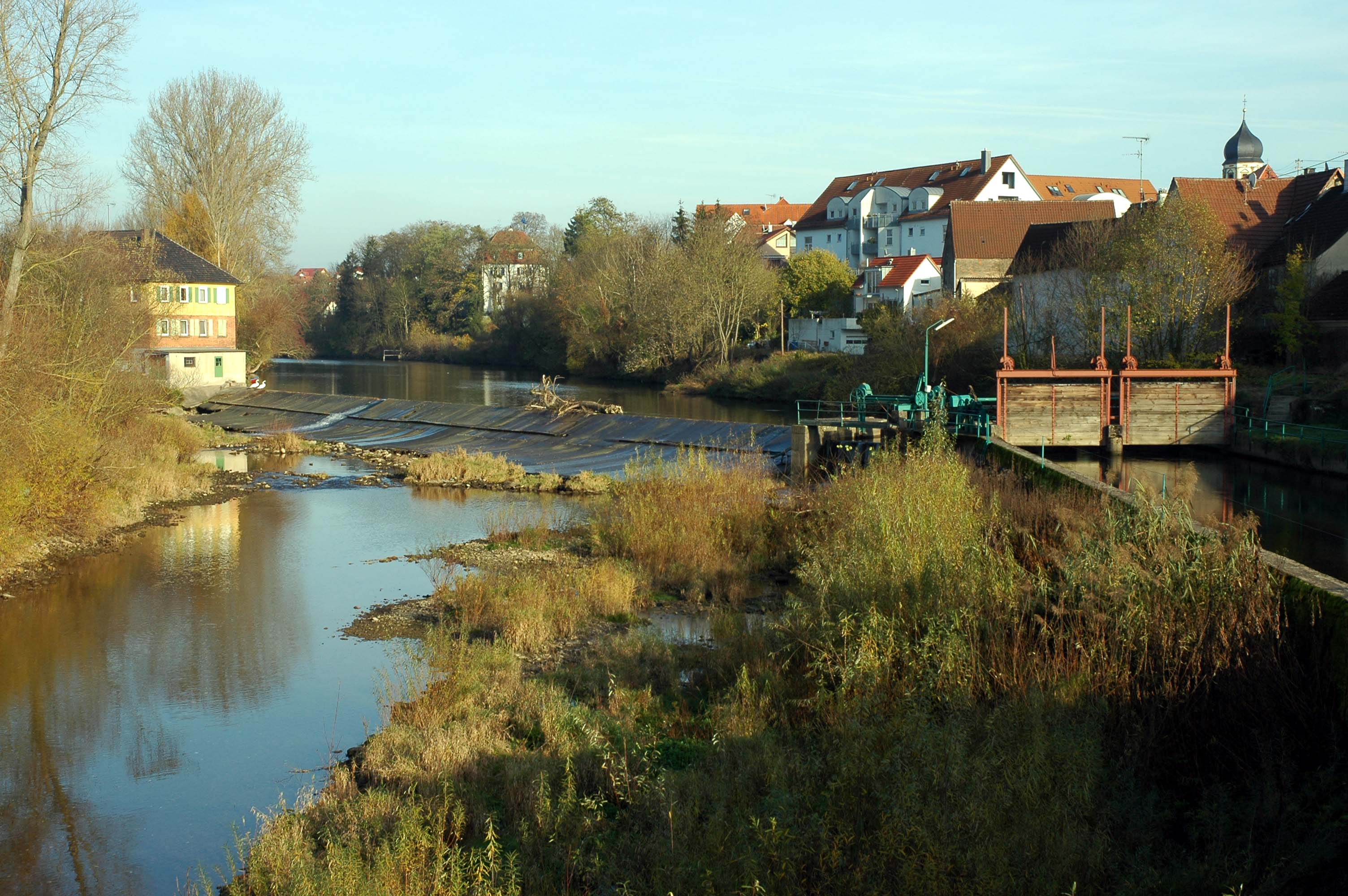
- A dam on the Kocher in Oedheim

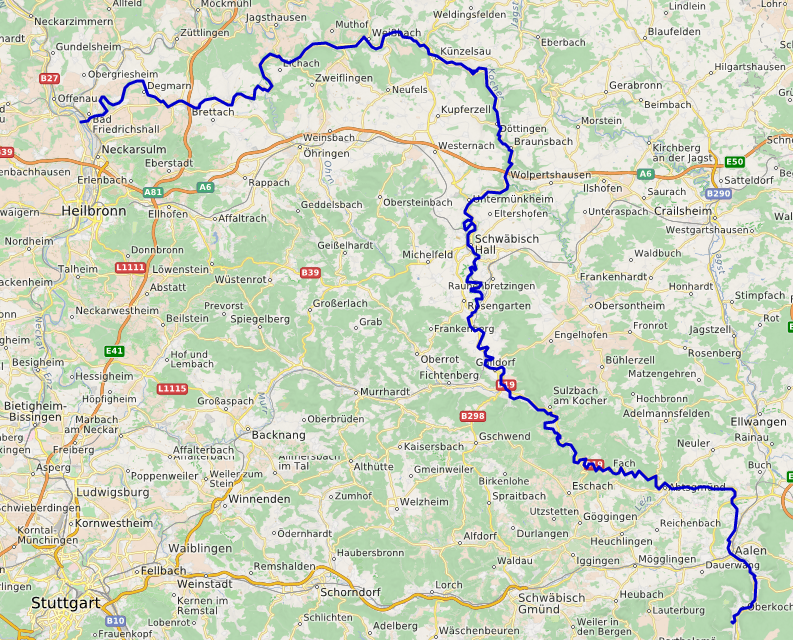

Location
- Country: Germany

Physical characteristics
- Source
  - location: Swabian Alb
  - elevation: 510 m (1,670 ft)
- Mouth
  - location: Neckar
  - coordinates: 49°13′22″N 9°12′7″E
- Length: 168.7 km (104.8 mi)
- Basin size: 1,960 km^{2} (760 sq mi)
- Discharge
  - average: Schwarzer Kocher: 680 L/s (24 cu ft/s); Weißer Kocher: 400 L/s (14 cu ft/s)

Basin features
- Progression: Neckar→ Rhine→ North Sea

The Kocher (German pronunciation: [ˈkɔxɐ]) is a 169 km (105 mi)-long right tributary of the Neckar in the north-eastern part of Baden-Württemberg, Germany. The name "Kocher" originates from its Celtic name "cochan" and probably means winding, meandering river. Its total drainage area is 1,960 km^{2} (760 sq mi). The Kocher rises in the eastern foothills of the Swabian Alb from two karst springs, the Schwarzer (black) Kocher and the Weißer (white) Kocher, that join in Unterkochen near Aalen. The Schwarzer Kocher is approximately 8 km (5.0 mi) long. Its source discharge varies between 50 L/s and 4,000 L/s with an average of 680 L/s. The 3.3 km (2.1 mi) long Weißer Kocher has an average discharge of 400 L/s.

== Course ==
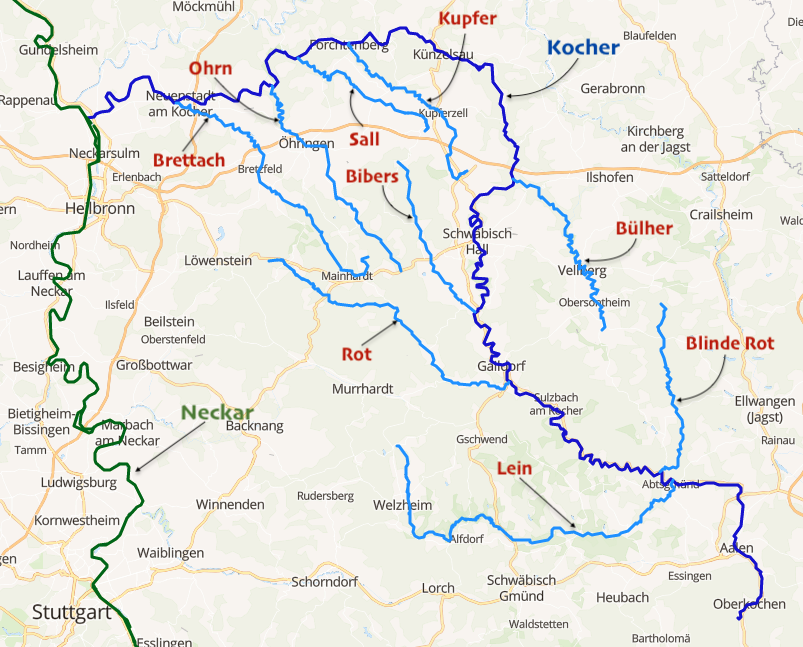
Course of the Kocher and its main tributaries

The Schwarzer Kocher rises south of Oberkochen. The second source, the Weißer Kocher rises west of Unterkochen village, located in district Ostalbkreis, municipality in Baden-Wuerttemberg state, from many small sources. The name Weißer Kocher comes from the white foam on the water when it quickly rushes over the stones. In contrast, the Schwarzer Kocher flows rather slowly and the covered ground gives the water a dark color. Both headwaters join in Unterkochen and flow north through the city of Aalen and Wasseralfingen until Hüttlingen, where the Kocher turns west in the direction of Abtsgmünd. Here the Lein river discharges into the Kocher. The Kocher then winds further north-west to Unterrot, where it receives the river Rot and continues to the cities Gaildorf and Schwäbisch Hall. Near Geislingen the Bühler river flows into the Kocher. In a wide curve the Kocher then turns west again, cutting into the plain of Hohenlohe and flowing through Künzelsau. It continues further to Neuenstadt am Kocher where it receives the Brettach river. Near Bad Friedrichshall the Kocher flows into the Neckar, a few Kilometers upstream from the mouth of the river Jagst, that flows more or less parallel north-east to the Kocher.

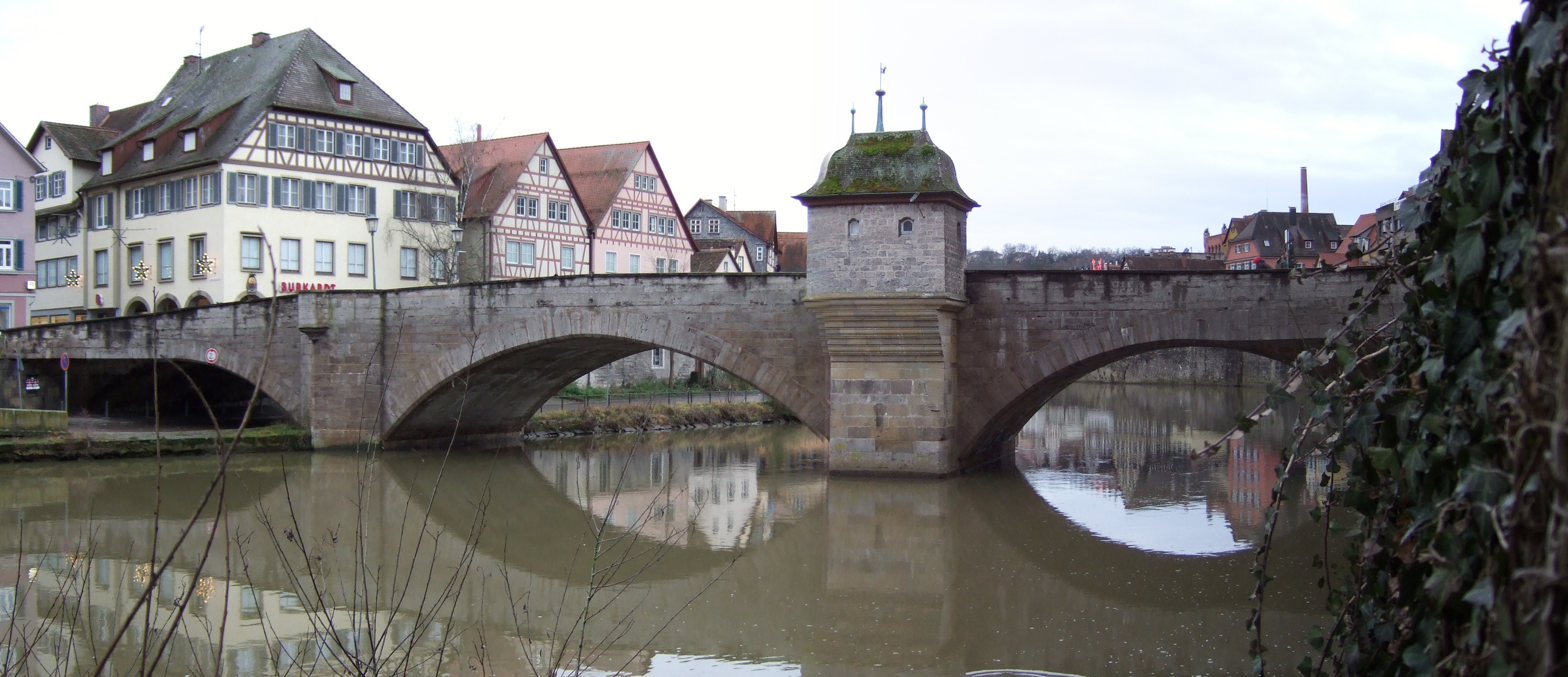
The Henkersbrücke spans the Kocher at Schwäbisch Hall

== Water quality and pollution ==
Many industrial sites in the upper Kocher valley and poor sewage plants led to heavy pollution of the Kocher. In 1984, the Kocher was declared the most polluted river in the administrative district of Stuttgart. After only a six years remediation project, the water quality significantly improved and today the Kocher is only moderately polluted. The mostly brown color of the Kocher comes from mud in the water and does not mean bad water quality.

== Tributaries ==
The following rivers are tributaries to the Kocher (from source to mouth):

- Left: Black Kocher (Schwarzer Kocher), Aal, Lein, Rot (Fichtenberger Rot), Bibers, Kupfer, Sall, Ohrn, Brettach
- Right: White Kocher (Weißer Kocher), Blinde Rot, Rötenbach, Eisbach, Adelbach, Bühler, Orlacher Bach, Reichenbach, Ernsbach
