= Miesach =

River in Germany

Location
- Country: Germany
- States: Baden-Württemberg

Physical characteristics
- Mouth
  - location: Kanzach
  - coordinates: 48.1309°N 9.5348°E

Basin features
- Progression: Kanzach→ Danube→ Black Sea

Miesach is a small river of Baden-Württemberg, Germany. It flows into the Kanzach near Dürmentingen.

== See also ==
- List of rivers of Baden-Württemberg
