= Kanzach (river) =

River in Germany

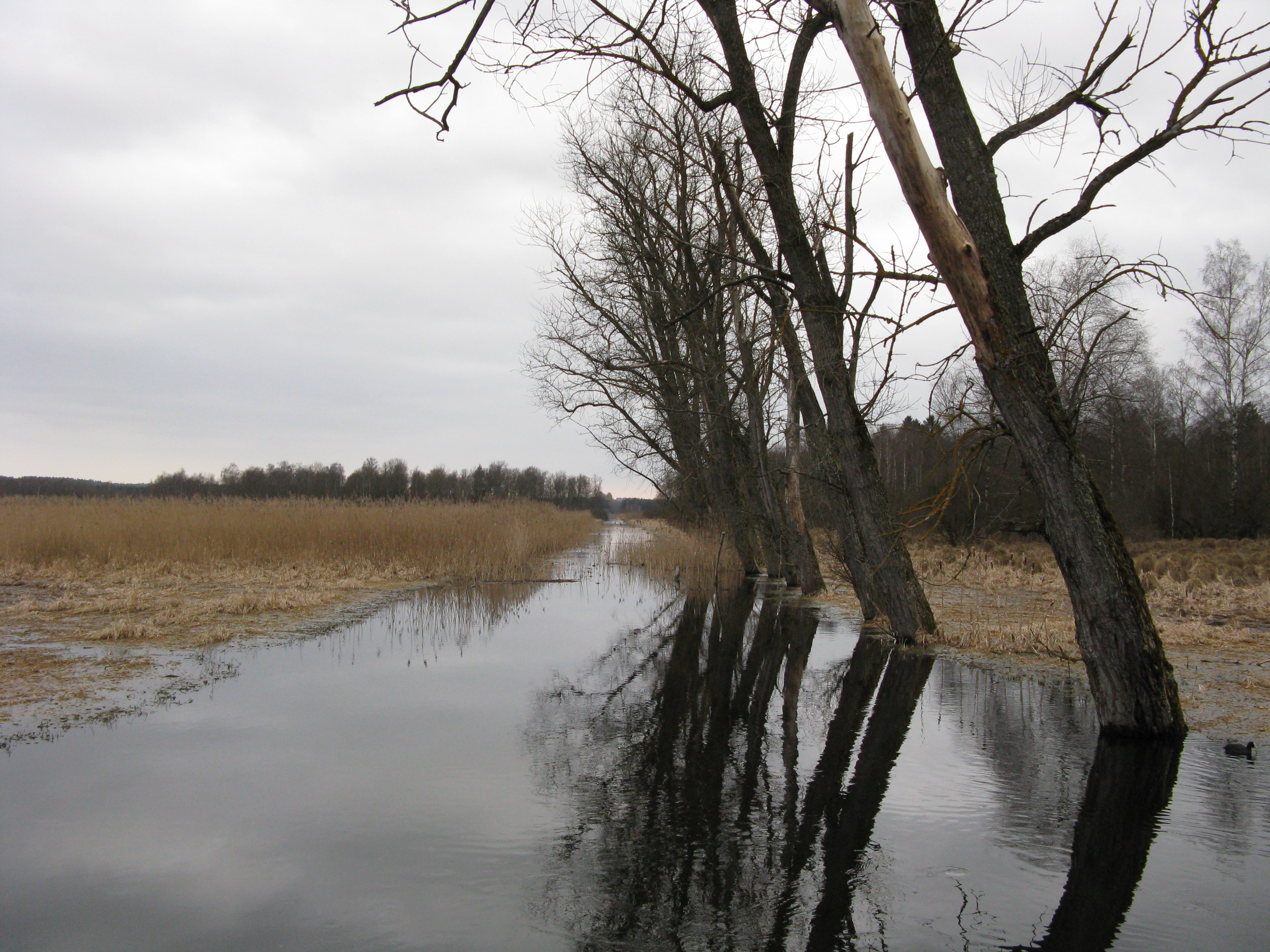

Location
- Country: Germany
- State: Baden-Württemberg

Physical characteristics
- Mouth
  - location: Danube
  - coordinates: 48.1839°N 9.5000°E
- Length: 25.8 km (16.0 mi)

Basin features
- Progression: Danube→ Black Sea

Kanzach (German pronunciation: [ˈkant͡sax]) is a river of Baden-Württemberg, Germany. It flows into the Danube near Unlingen.

== See also ==
- List of rivers of Baden-Württemberg
