= List of mountains and hills of Baden-Württemberg =

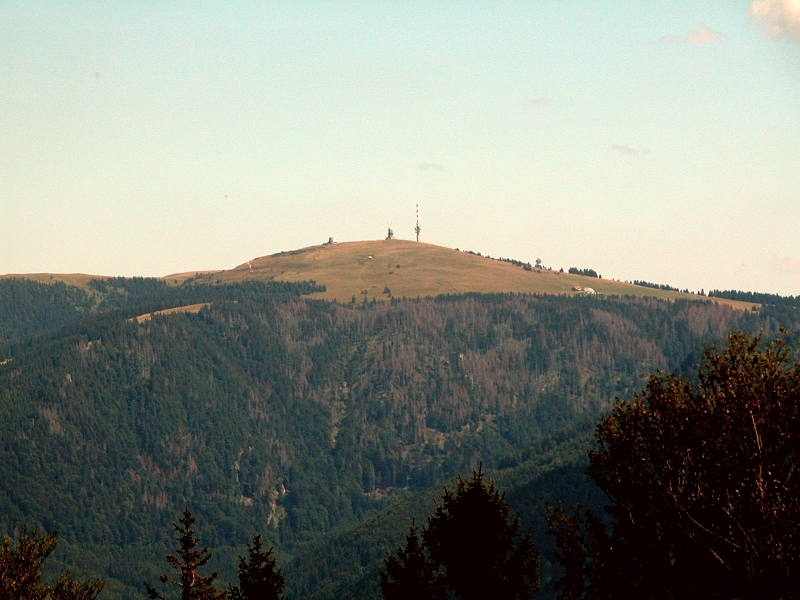
The Feldberg, the highest mountain in Baden-Württemberg

This list of mountains and hills of Baden-Württemberg shows a selection of mountains, hills and high points in the German state of Baden-Württemberg, sorted by height in metres (m) above sea level (NHN).

== Highest mountains, hills and high points in Baden-Württemberg’s regions ==
The following table shows the highest mountain, hill or high point in each of the natural regions or landscapes of Baden-Württemberg.

In the landscape column, large-scale or high Central Uplands are shown in bold, italics are used to indicate landscapes or local areas of upland or valleys, sometimes dominated by just an isolated hill. Clicking on the word “List” in the “Lists” column leads to an article that describes or lists other mountains and hills in that landscape or region; these may include elements that lie outside Baden-Württemberg.

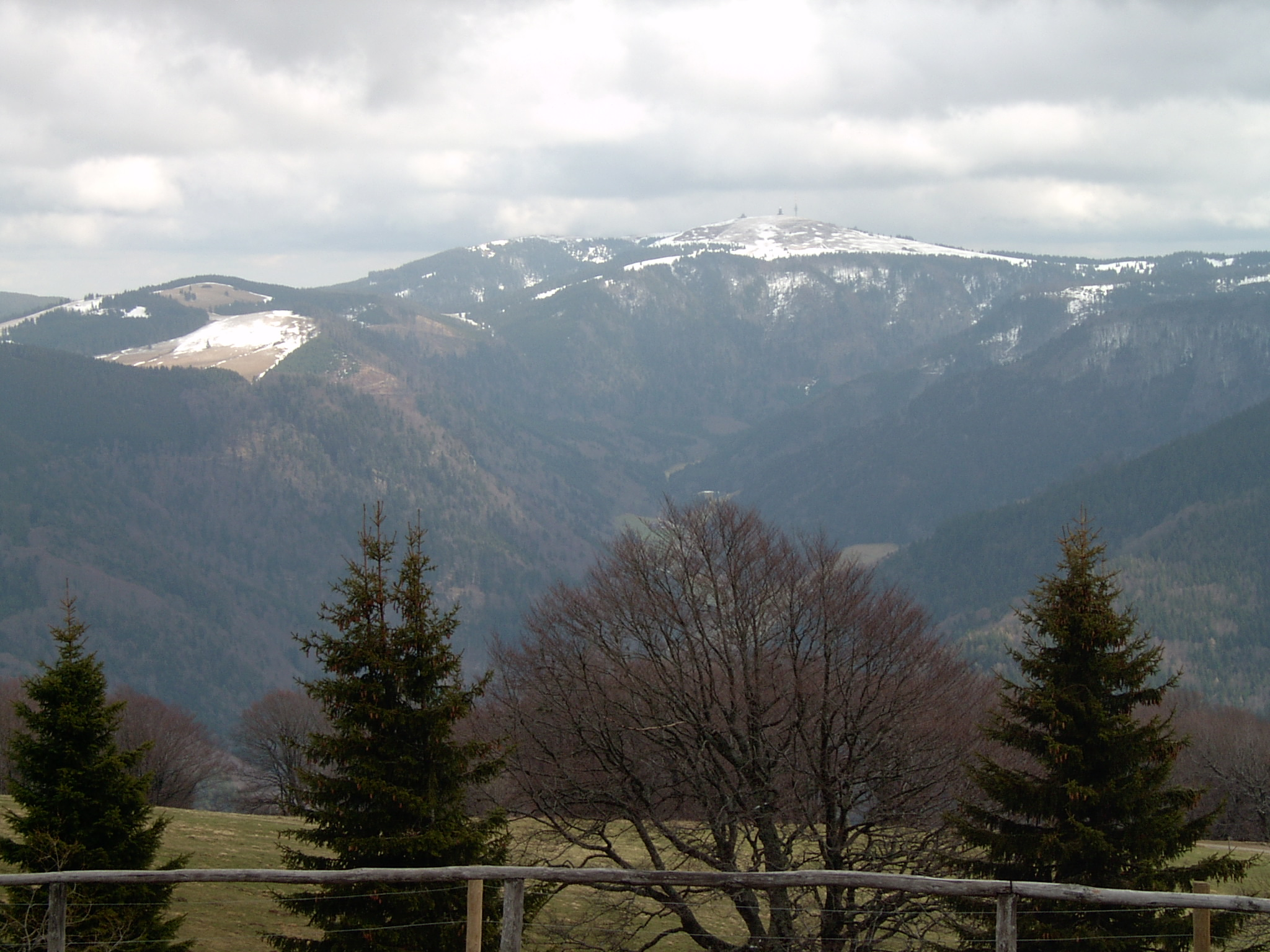
Feldberg (Black Forest)

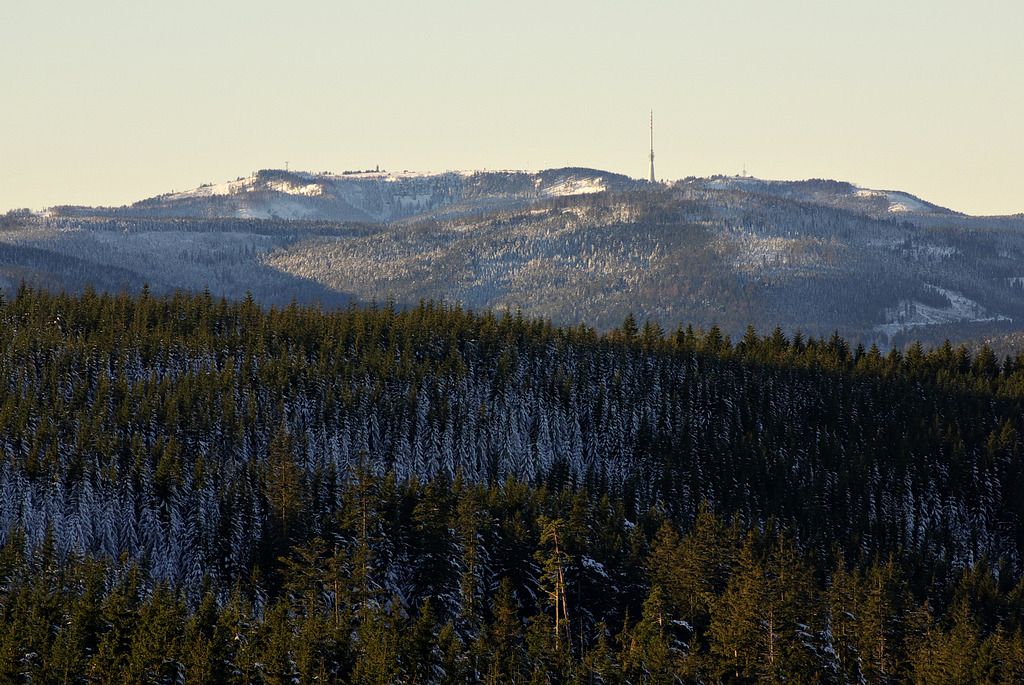
Hornisgrinde (Black Forest)

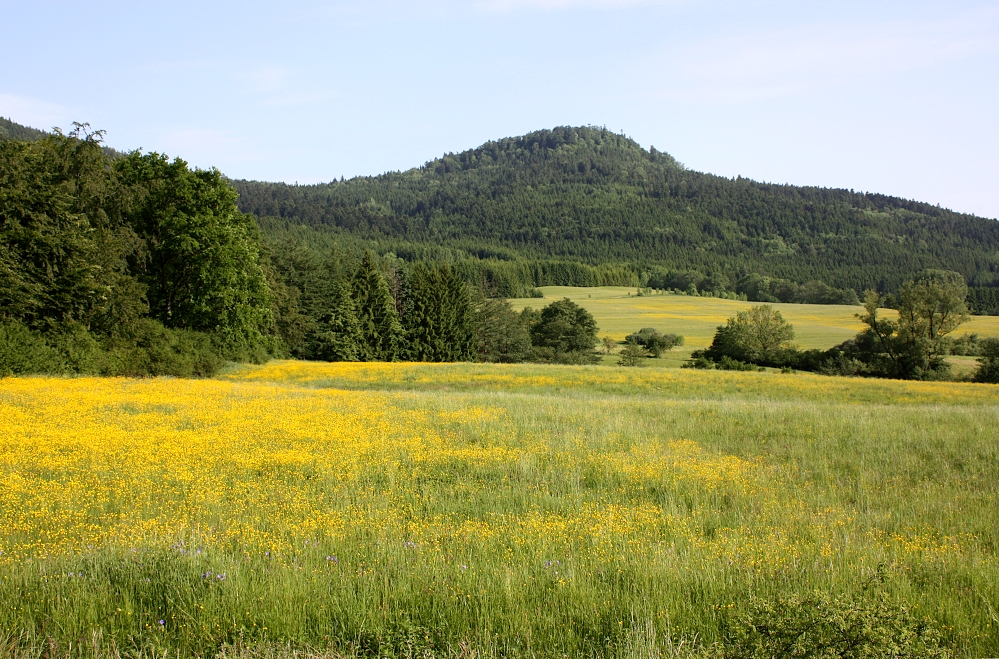
Lemberg (Swabian Jura)

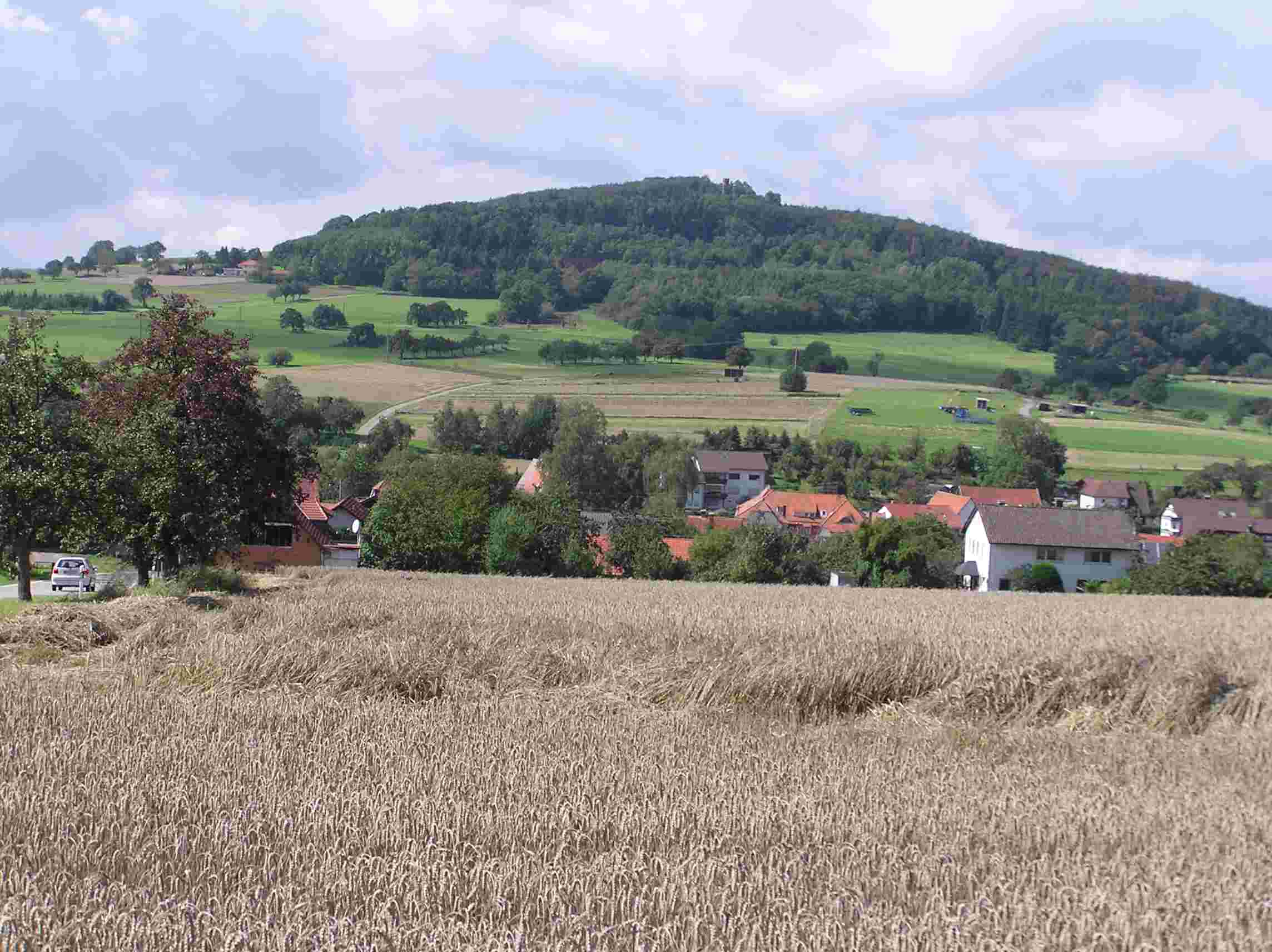
Katzenbuckel (Odenwald)

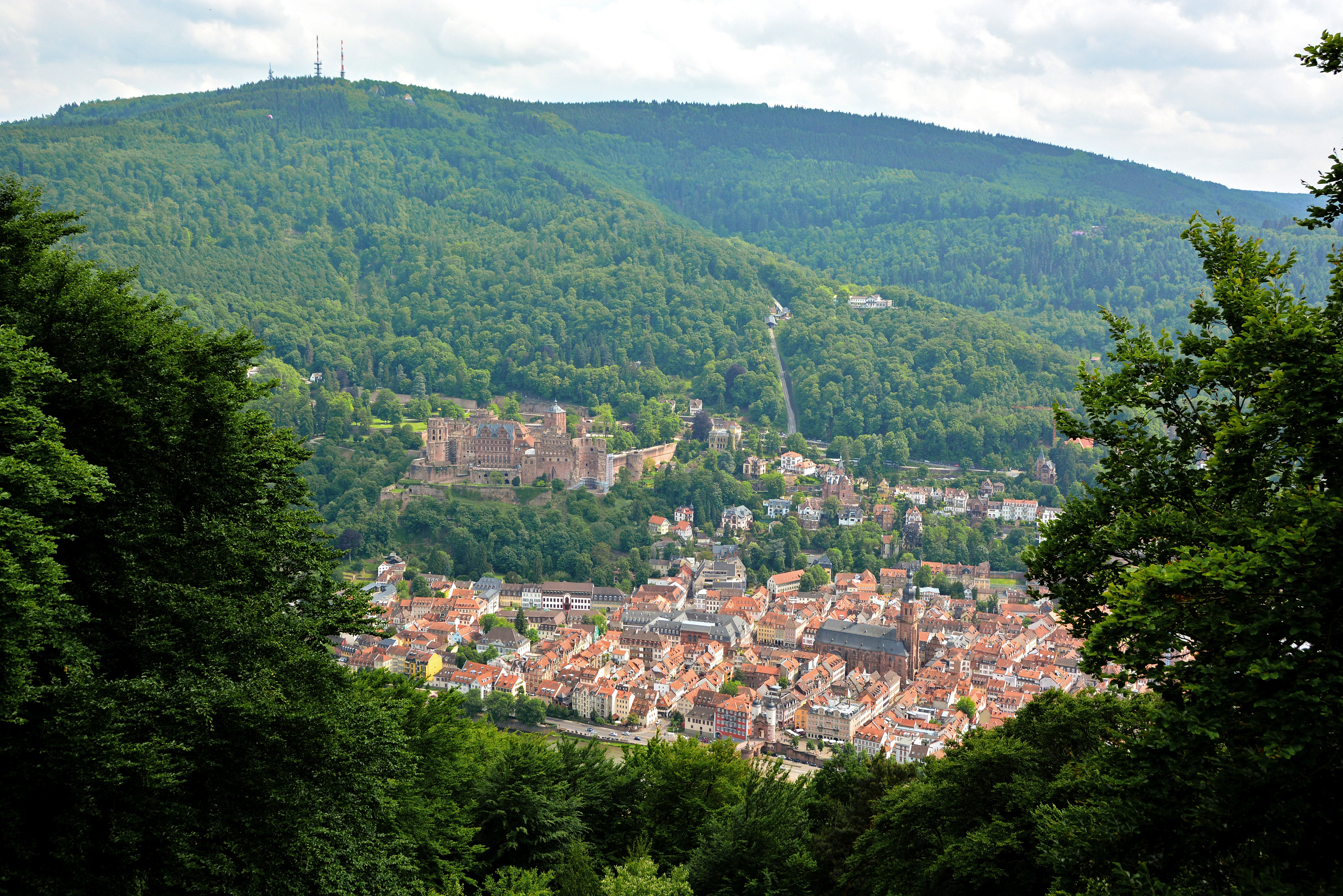
Königstuhl (Kleiner Odenwald)

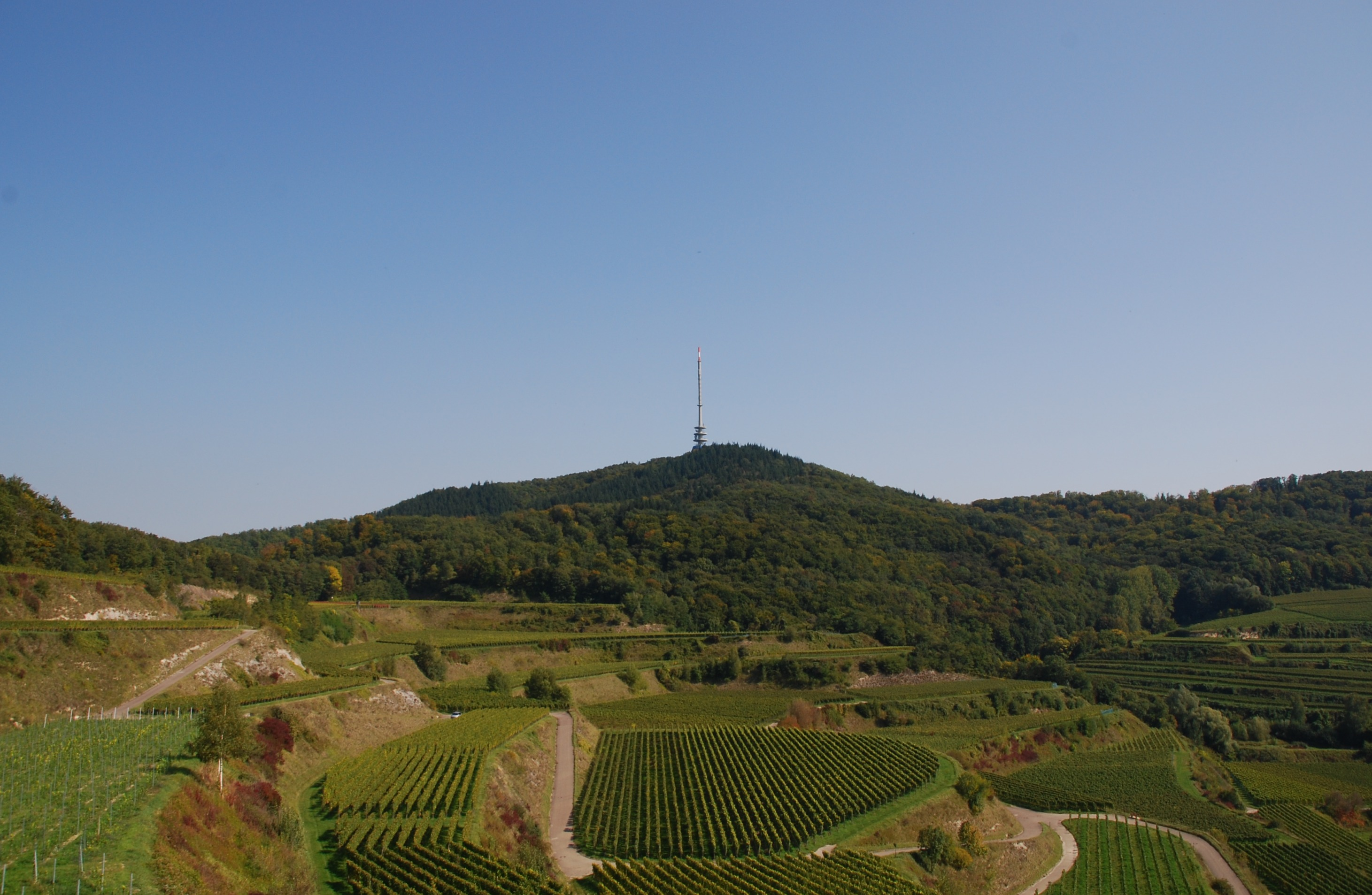
Totenkopf (Kaiserstuhl)

The table is initially sorted by height, but can be rearranged by other criteria. Clicking on the symbol in a particular column will sort the table by the entries in that column.

Mountain/Hill	Height (m)	Landscape	Lists	County/counties town or city
Feldberg	1,493.0	**Black Forest**	List	Breisgau-Hochschwarzwald; Waldshut
Schwarzer Grat	1,118.0	**Adelegg**	List	Ravensburg
Lemberg	1,015.3	**Swabian Jura**	List	Tuttlingen
Neuhewen	863.9	Hegau	List	Konstanz
Höchsten	837.8	Linzgau	---	Bodensee; Sigmaringen
Galgenberg	776.6	Altdorf Forest	List	Ravensburg
unnamed summit	715.6	Schiener Berg	List	Konstanz
unnamed summit	706.5	Atzenberger Höhe	---	Ravensburg
unnamed summit	700	Holzstöcke	List	Ravensburg
unnamed summit	697.9	Wagenhart	List	Ravensburg
unnamed summit	693.4	Bodanrück	List	Konstanz
Katzenbuckel	626.0	**Odenwald**	List	Neckar-Odenwald
Daumen	611	Hecken- and Schlehengäu	List	Calw
Hohwacht	590	Rammert	List	Zollernalb
Hohe Brach	586.4	Mainhardt Forest	List	Rems-Murr
Hagberg	585.2	Welzheim Forest	List	Ostalb
Bromberg	582.6	Schönbuch	List	Böblingen
Hornberg	580.0	Virngrund	---	Ostalb
Hohenstein	572	Murrhardt Forest	List	Rems-Murr
Königstuhl	567.8	Kleiner Odenwald	List	Rhein-Neckar; Neckar-Odenwald; Heidelberg (Stadtkreis)
Hohentannen	565.4	Frickenhofer Höhe	List	Ostalb
Altenberg	564.7	Limpurg Hills	List	Schwäbisch Hall
Raitelberg	561.0	Löwenstein Hills	List	Heilbronn
Totenkopf	556.6	Kaiserstuhl	---	Breisgau-Hochschwarzwald
Hohe Flum	536.2	Dinkelberg	List	Lörrach
Mühlberg	522.8	Waldenburg Hills	List	Hohenlohe
unnamed summit	519.6	Buocher Höhe	List	Rems-Murr
Kernen	513.2	Schurwald	List	Rems-Murr
Bopser (Hoher Bopser)	485.2	Filder	List	Stuttgart (Stadtkreis)
Baiselsberg	476.6	Stromberg	List	Ludwigsburg
Maschlanden	417	Bauland	---	Main-Tauber
Heidelberg	335.9	Heuchelberg	List	Heilbronn
unnamed summit	334	Harthausen Forest	---	Heilbronn; Hohenlohe

== Mountains and hills in the state of Baden-Württemberg ==
Name, Height, Location (Settlement, county/counties, region)

- Feldberg (1,493.0 m), Breisgau-Hochschwarzwald, Black Forest
- Seebuck (1,448.2 m), Breisgau-Hochschwarzwald, Black Forest
- Herzogenhorn (1,415.2 m), Waldshut, Black Forest
- Belchen (1,414.0 m), Lörrach/Breisgau-Hochschwarzwald, Black Forest
- Stübenwasen (1,386.0 m), Todtnauberg, Lörrach, Black Forest
- Silberberg (1,358 m), Todtnau-Brandenberg, Lörrach, Black Forest
- Spießhorn (1,348.9 m), Bernau, Waldshut, Black Forest
- Toter Mann (1,320.7 m), Oberried, Breisgau-Hochschwarzwald, Black Forest
- Blößling (1,309.6 m), Bernau, Waldshut, Black Forest
- Bärhalde (1,317 m), Feldberg-Neuglashütten/Menzenschwand, Breisgau-Hochschwarzwald/Waldshut, Black Forest
- Zweiseenblick (1,305 m), Feldberg-Neuglashütten, Breisgau-Hochschwarzwald, Black Forest
- Schnepfhalde (1,299 m), Schluchsee/Menzenschwand, Breisgau-Hochschwarzwald/Waldshut, Black Forest
- Schauinsland (1,284.4 m), Freiburg im Breisgau/ Breisgau-Hochschwarzwald, Black Forest
- Trubelsmattkopf (1,281.4 m), Muggenbrunn, Lörrach, Black Forest
- Habsberg (1,274 m), Schluchsee, Breisgau-Hochschwarzwald, Black Forest
- Wieswaldkopf (1,278 m), Hinterzarten, Breisgau-Hochschwarzwald, Black Forest
- Hochkopf (1,263.4 m), Todtmoos/Präg, Waldshut, Black Forest
- Kandel (1,241.4 m), Emmendingen/ Breisgau-Hochschwarzwald, Black Forest
- Köhlgarten (1,224 m), Neuenweg/Wies, Lörrach, Black Forest
- Farnberg (1,218.0 m), Todtmoos/Bernau/Ibach, Waldshut, Black Forest
- Bötzberg (1,209 m), St. Blasien, Waldshut, Black Forest
- Windeck (1,209 m), Hinterzarten, Breisgau-Hochschwarzwald, Black Forest
- Sengalenkopf (1,208 m), Todtnau-Gschwend, Lörrach, Black Forest
- Hochgscheid (1,207 m), Fröhnd, Lörrach, Southern Black Forest
- Hinterwaldkopf (1,198.2 m), Breisgau-Hochschwarzwald, Black Forest
- Hochfirst (1,190.1 m), Titisee-Neustadt/Lenzkirch, Breisgau-Hochschwarzwald, Black Forest
- Weißtannenhöhe (1,190 m), Breitnau/Titisee-Neustadt, Breisgau-Hochschwarzwald, Black Forest
- Hörnle (Münstertal) (1,187 m), near Münstertal/Wieden, Breisgau-Hochschwarzwald/Lörrach, Black Forest
- Obereck (1,176.6 m), Simonswald, Emmendingen, Black Forest
- Griesbacher Eck (1,172 m), Simonswald, Emmendingen, Black Forest
- Rohrenkopf (1,170 m), Lörrach, Black Forest
- Blauen (auch Hochblauen) (1,165 m), Breisgau-Hochschwarzwald/Lörrach, Black Forest
- Hornisgrinde (1,164 m), Ortenaukreis, Black Forest
- Roßeck (1,154 m), Simonswald, Emmendingen, Black Forest
- Rohrhardsberg (1,152 m), Black Forest-Baar-Kreis, Black Forest
- Brend (1,148 m), Black Forest-Baar-Kreis/ Emmendingen, Black Forest
- Steinberg (1,141 m), Neukirch, Black Forest-Baar-Kreis, Black Forest
- Bossenbühl (1,127 m), Waldau, Breisgau-Hochschwarzwald, Black Forest
- Hornkopf (1,121 m), Simonswald, Emmendingen, Black Forest
- Schwarzer Grat (1,118.0 m), Ravensburg, Adelegg
- Sirnitz (1,114 m), Münstertal/Badenweiler, Breisgau-Hochschwarzwald, Black Forest
- Tafelbühl (1,084 m), Simonswald, Emmendingen, Black Forest
- Altsteigerskopf (1,082 m), Ortenaukreis, Black Forest
- Hundsrücken (1,080 m), near the Hornisgrinde, Ortenaukreis, Black Forest
- Zeller Blauen (heute seltener Hochblauen) (1,077 m), Lörrach, Black Forest
- Stöcklewald (1,068.2 m), Black Forest-Baar-Kreis, Black Forest
- Hasenhorn (1,058 m), Lörrach, Black Forest
- Vogelskopf (1,056 m), Freudenstadt und Ortenaukreis, Black Forest
- Schliffkopf (1,055 m), Freudenstadt, Black Forest
- Hoher Ochsenkopf (1,054 m), Rastatt, Black Forest
- Seekopf (1,054 m), Ortenaukreis, Freudenstadt, Black Forest
- Gschasikopf (1,045 m), Elzach, Emmendingen, Black Forest
- Hochkopf (1,039 m), Ortenaukreis, Black Forest
- Bubshorn (1,032 m), Fröhnd/Pfaffenberg, Lörrach, Black Forest
- Honeck (1,022 m), Bürchau, Lörrach, Black Forest
- Lemberg (1,015.3 m), Tuttlingen, Swabian Jura
- Pfälzer Kopf (1,013 m), Baiersbronn, Freudenstadt, Black Forest
- Oberhohenberg (1,011 m), Zollernalbkreis, Swabian Jura
- Hochberg (1,009 m), Tuttlingen, Swabian Jura
- Mehliskopf (1,009 m), Rastatt, Black Forest
- Wandbühl (1,007 m), Tuttlingen, Swabian Jura
- Rainen (1,006 m), Tuttlingen, Swabian Jura
- Rappeneck (1,006 m), Breisgau-Hochschwarzwald, Black Forest
- Montschenloch (1,004 m), Tuttlingen, Swabian Jura
- Wilhelmshöhe (1,003 m), Black Forest-Baar-Kreis, Black Forest
- Badener Höhe (1,002 m), Baden-Baden/ Rastatt, Black Forest
- Bol (1,002 m), Tuttlingen, Swabian Jura
- Hummelsberg (1,002 m), Tuttlingen, Swabian Jura
- Plettenberg (1,002 m), Zollernalbkreis, Swabian Jura
- Kehlen (1,001 m), Tuttlingen, Swabian Jura
- Riesenköpfle (1,001 m), Baiersbronn, Freudenstadt, Black Forest
- Seekopf (1,001 m), near Forbach-Herrenwies, Rastatt, Black Forest
- Gugel (998 m), near Herrischried, Waldshut Tiengen, Black Forest
- Ortenberg (995 m), Tuttlingen, Swabian Jura
- Weichenwang (989 m), Zollernalbkreis, Swabian Jura
- Hohloh (988 m), Rastatt, Black Forest
- Dreifaltigkeitsberg (983 m), Tuttlingen, Swabian Jura
- Hohe Möhr (983 m), Lörrach, Black Forest
- Lupfen (977 m), Tuttlingen, Swabian Jura
- Alexanderschanze (970 m), Freudenstadt, Black Forest
- Lochenstein (963 m), Zollernalbkreis, Swabian Jura
- Raichberg (956 m), Zollernalbkreis, Swabian Jura
- Böllat (956 m), Zollernalbkreis, Swabian Jura
- Brandenkopf (945 m), Ortenaukreis, Black Forest
- Hundsrücken (931 m), Zollernalbkreis, Swabian Jura
- Zeller Horn (912 m), Zollernalbkreis, Swabian Jura
- Hohenkarpfen (912 m), Tuttlingen, Swabian Jura
- Teufelsmühle (908 m), Rastatt, Black Forest
- Hörnleberg (905.6 m), near Gutach im Breisgau, Emmendingen, Black Forest
- Kornbühl (886 m), Zollernalbkreis, Swabian Jura
- Hörnle (Bollschweil) (885.8 m), near Bollschweil, Breisgau-Hochschwarzwald, Black Forest
- Moos (878 m), Ortenaukreis, Black Forest
- Herrenwieser Sattel (878 m), Baden-Baden/ Rastatt, Black Forest
- Römerstein (872 m), Reutlingen, Swabian Jura
- Roßberg (869 m), Reutlingen, Swabian Jura
- Neuhewen (863.9 m), Konstanz, Hegau
- Witthoh (862 m), Tuttlingen, Höhenzug am Rand der Schwäbischen Alb
- Zoller (855 m), Zollernalbkreis, Swabian Jura
- Sternberg (844 m), Reutlingen, Swabian Jura
- Hohenhewen (844 m), Konstanz, Hegau
- Hohenstoffel (844 m), Konstanz, Hegau
- Höchsten (837.8 m), Bodenseekreis/ Sigmaringen, Linzgau
- Hohe Warte (820 m), Reutlingen, Swabian Jura
- Boßler (799.7 m), Göppingen, Swabian Jura
- Wachbühl (791 m), Ravensburg, Zeiler Schotterfeld
- Farrenkopf (789 m), Ortenaukreis, Black Forest
- Kaltes Feld (781 m), Ostalbkreis, Swabian Jura
- Galgenberg (776.6 m), Ravensburg, Altdorf Forest
- Teckberg (775 m), Esslingen, Swabian Jura
- Waldburg (772 m), Ravensburg, Oberschwaben
- Bussen (767 m), Biberach, Oberschwaben
- Fuchseck (762 m), Göppingen, Swabian Jura
- Stuifen (757 m), Ostalbkreis, Swabian Jura
- Gehrenberg (754 m), Bodenseekreis, Linzgau
- Grabener Höhe (754 m), Ravensburg, Oberschwaben
- Volkmarsberg (743 m), Ostalbkreis, Swabian Jura
- unnamed summit (715.6 m), Konstanz, Schiener mountain
- Hohbäumle (712 m), Biberach, Oberschwaben
- Sielenwang (710 m), Göppingen, Swabian Jura
- Achalm (707.1 m), Reutlingen, Swabian Jura
- Hörnle, Esslingen/Reutlingen, Swabian Jura
- Rechberg (707 m), Ostalbkreis, Swabian Jura
- unnamed summit (706.5 m), Ravensburg, Atzenberger Höhe
- unnamed summit (697.9 m), Ravensburg, Wagenhart
- Bernstein (694 m), Rastatt/ Calw, Black Forest
- unnamed summit (693.4 m), Konstanz, Bodanrück
- Brandeckkopf (686 m), Offenburg, Ortenaukreis, Mittlerer Black Forest
- Hohentwiel (686 m), Konstanz, Hegau
- Hohenstaufen (684 m), Göppingen, Swabian Jura
- Merkur (668 m), Baden-Baden/ Rastatt, Black Forest
- Ipf (668 m), Ostalbkreis, Swabian Jura
- Mägdeberg (664 m), Konstanz, Hegau
- Schönberg (644 m), Breisgau-Hochschwarzwald/Freiburg im Breisgau, Black Forest Foothills
- Hohenkrähen (644 m), Konstanz, Hegau
- Katzenbuckel (626.0 m), Neckar-Odenwald-Kreis, Odenwald
- Mahlberg (613 m), Rastatt, Karlsruhe, Black Forest
- Daumen (611 m), Calw, Heckengau and Schlehengäu
- Staufen (593 m), Konstanz, Hegau
- Hohwacht (590 m), Zollernalbkreis, Rammert
- Rangenbergle (589 m), Reutlingen
- Hohe Brach (586.4 m), Rems-Murr-Kreis, Mainhardt Forest
- Hagberg (585.2 m), Ostalbkreis, Welzheim Forest
- Stiefelhöhe (584 m), Rhein-Neckar-Kreis, Odenwald
- Bromberg (582.6 m), Böblingen, Schönbuch
- Hornberg (580.0 m) Ostalbkreis, Virngrund
- Battert (568 m), Baden-Baden, Black Forest
- Königstuhl (567.8 m), Rhein-Neckar-Kreis and Stadtkreis Heidelberg, Kleiner Odenwald
- Hohentannen (565.4 m), Ostalbkreis, Frickenhofer Höhe
- Altenberg (564.7 m), Schwäbisch Hall, Limpurg Hills
- Raitelberg (561.0 m), Heilbronn, Löwenstein Mountains
- Totenkopf (556.6 m), Breisgau-Hochschwarzwald, Kaiserstuhl
- Kinzert (554 m), Neckar-Odenwald-Kreis, Odenwald
- Weißer Stein (550 m), Rhein-Neckar-Kreis, Odenwald
- Hohe Warte (548 m), Rhein-Neckar-Kreis, Odenwald
- Friedinger Schlossberg (545.5 m), Konstanz, Hegau
- Zollstock (543.7), Rems-Murr-Kreis, Murrhardt Forest
- Stocksberg (538.9 m), Heilbronn, Löwenstein Hills
- Hohe Flum (536.2 m), Lörrach, Dinkelberg
- Fremersberg (525 m), Baden-Baden, Rastatt, Black Forest
- Steinknickle (525 m), Heilbronn, Mainhardt Forest
- Mühlberg (522.8 m), Hohenlohekreis, Waldenburg Hills
- Eichelspitze (521.3 m), Breisgau-Hochschwarzwald, Kaiserstuhl
- unnamed summit (519.6 m), Rems-Murr-Kreis, Buocher Höhe
- Kernen (513.2 m), Rems-Murr-Kreis, Schurwald
- Bopser (Hoher Hoher; 485.2 m), Stadtkreis Stuttgart, Filder
- Baiselberg (476.6 m), Ludwigsburg, Stromberg
- Heiligenberg (445 m), Heidelberg, Odenwald
- Maschlanden (417 m), Main-Tauber-Kreis, Bauland
- Württemberg (395 m), Stuttgart, Schurwald
- Wunnenstein (395 m), Ludwigsburg, Baden-Württemberg
- Heidelberg (335.9 m), Heilbronn, Heuchelberg
- unnamed summit (334 m), Heilbronn, Hohenlohekreis, Harthausen Forest
