= Swabian-Franconian Forest =

Upland region in Baden-Württemberg, Germany

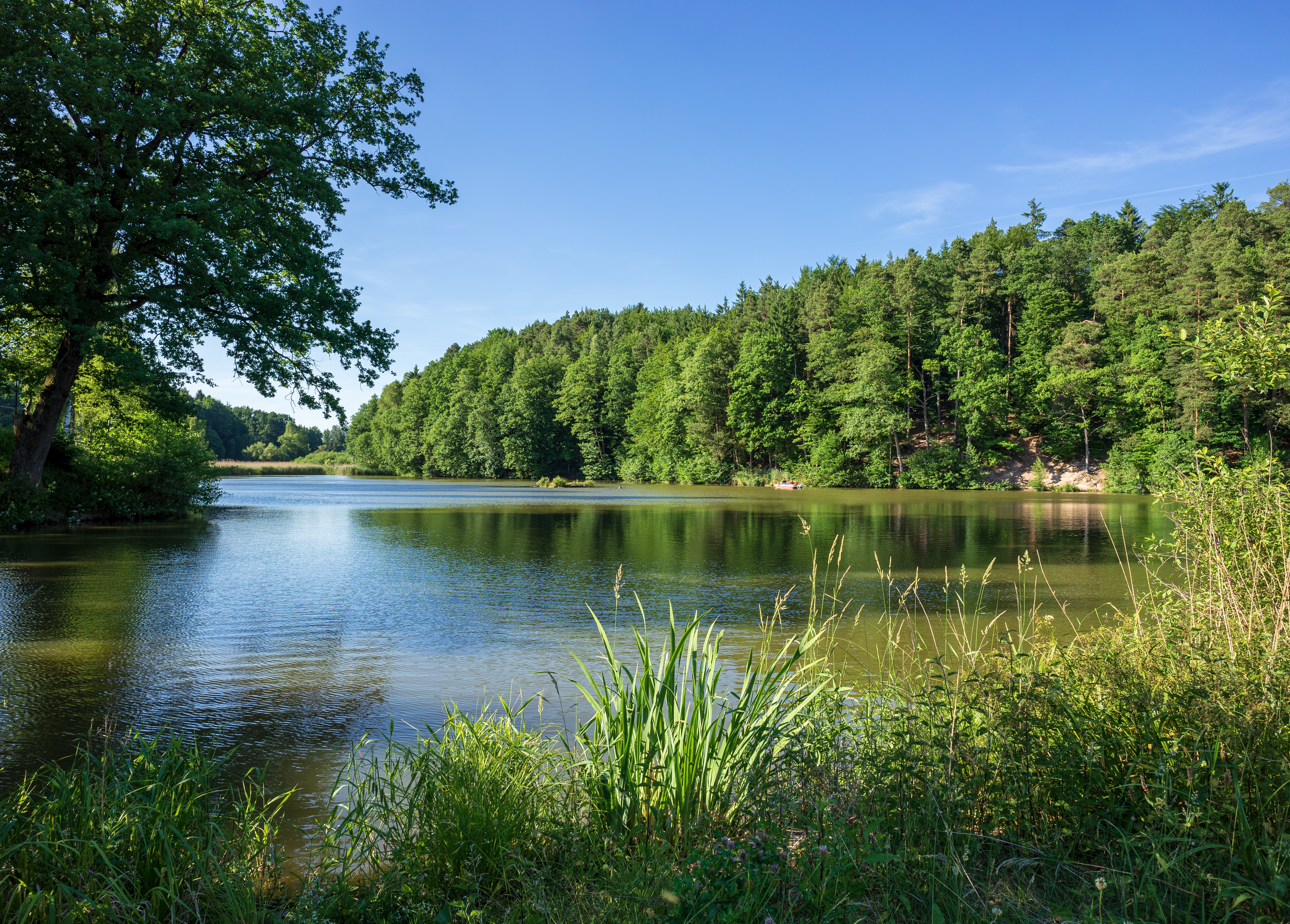
- Finsterroter lake in Naturpark Schwäbisch-Fränkischer Wald

Highest point
- Peak: Hohe Brach
- Elevation: 586.4 m above NHN

Dimensions
- Area: 1,187 km^{2} (458 mi^{2})

Geography
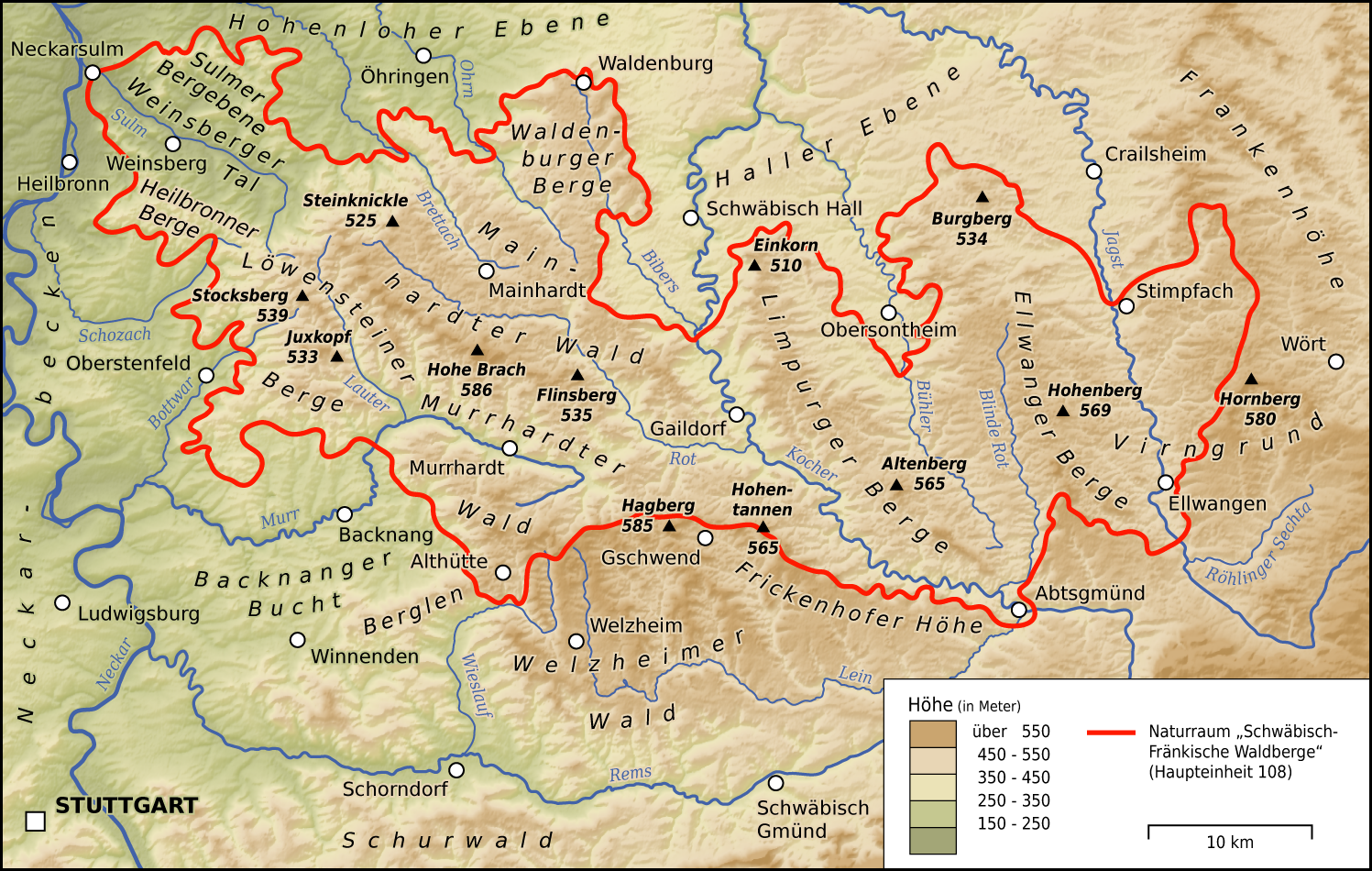
- The natural region major unit of the Swabian-Franconian Forest
- State(s): Baden-Württemberg, Germany
- Range coordinates: 49°02′13″N 9°33′01″E
- Parent range: Swabian Keuper-Lias Land

The Swabian-Franconian Forest (German: Schwäbisch-Fränkischen Waldberge, also Schwäbisch-Fränkischer Wald) is a mainly forested, deeply incised upland region, 1,187 km² in area and up to 586.4 m above sea level (NHN), in the northeast of Baden-Württemberg. It forms natural region major unit number 108 within the Swabian Keuper-Lias Land (major unit group 10 or D58). Its name is derived from the fact that, in medieval times, the border between the duchies of Franconia and Swabia ran through this forested region. In addition, the Swabian dialect in the south transitions to the East Franconian dialect in the north here.

== Hill ranges and hills ==
The Swabian-Franconian Forest is divided clockwise (beginning roughly in the north) into the Waldenburg Hills, Mainhardt Forest, Limpurg and Ellwangen Hills, Virngrund, Murrhardt Forest, Löwenstein Hills, Heilbronn Hills and Sulm Plateau; in addition the valley of Weinsberger Tal, which lies between the last two uplands, is part of the region

The highest point of the Swabian-Franconian Forest is the Hohe Brach (586.4 m). Other high hills include the Hagberg (585.2 m), Hornberg (580.0 m), Hohenstein (572 m), Hohenberg (568.9 m), Hohentannen (565.4 m), Altenberg (564.7 m), Stocksberg (538.9 m), Flinsberg (534.8 m), Juxkopf (533.1 m) and Steinknickle (524.9 m).

== Protections ==
Naturpark Schwäbisch-Fränkischer Wald, or Swabian-Franconian Forest Nature Park in English, is a nature park and protected area within the Swabian-Franconian Forest. The nature park covers an area of 1,270 km², including most of the Swabian-Franconian Forest, but also large areas of adjacent cultural landscapes and historical monuments.

== Gallery ==
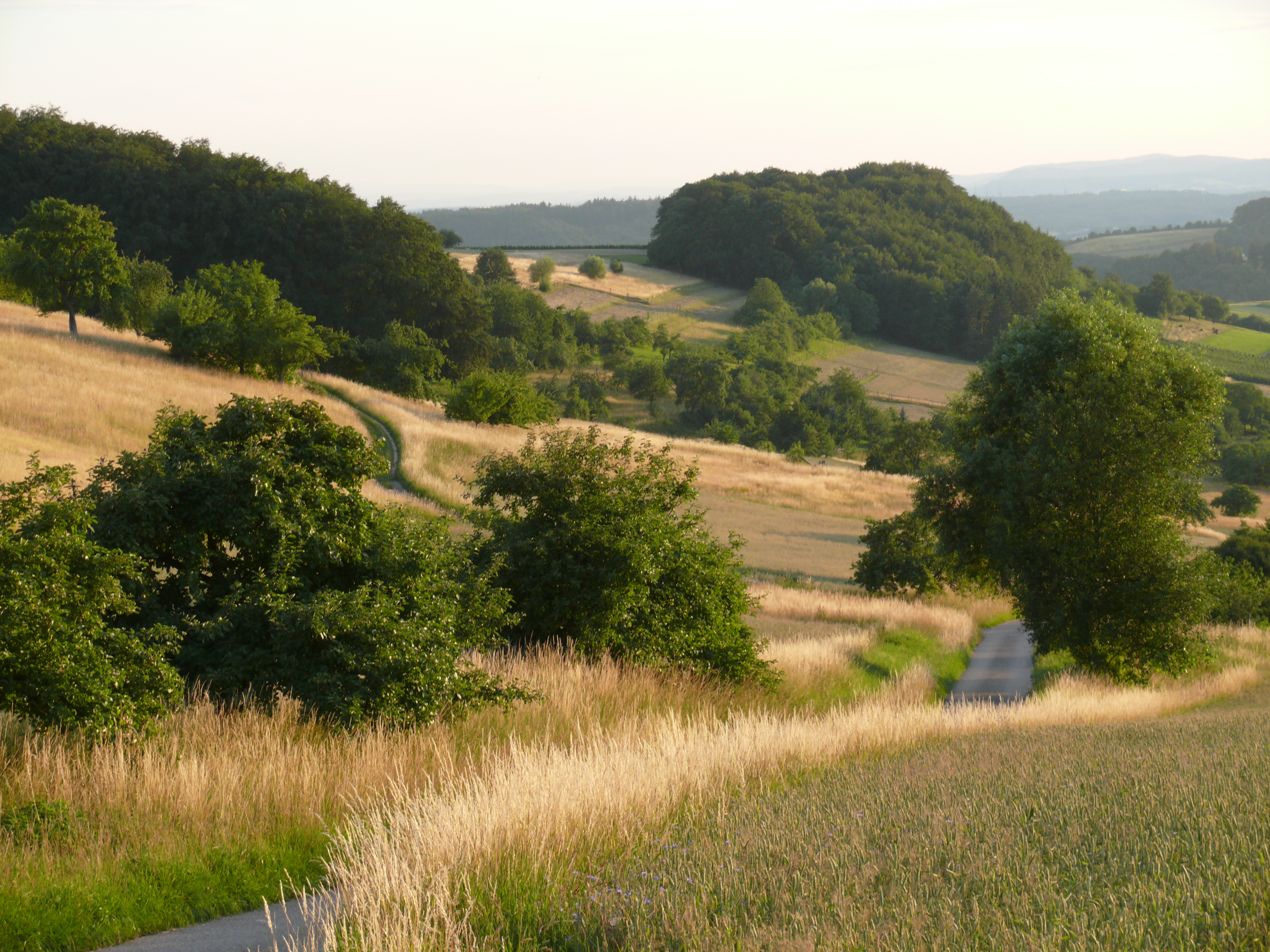
Rural cultural landscape

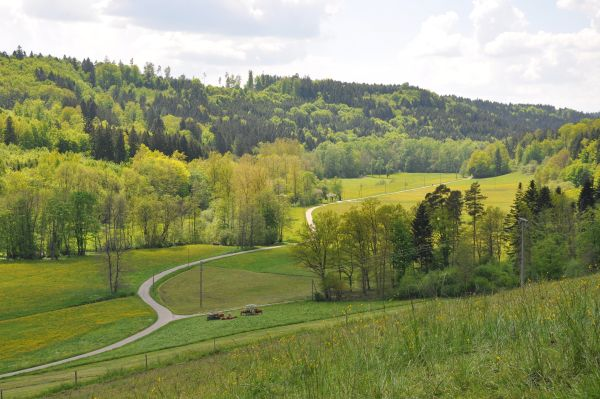
Meinhardt Forest

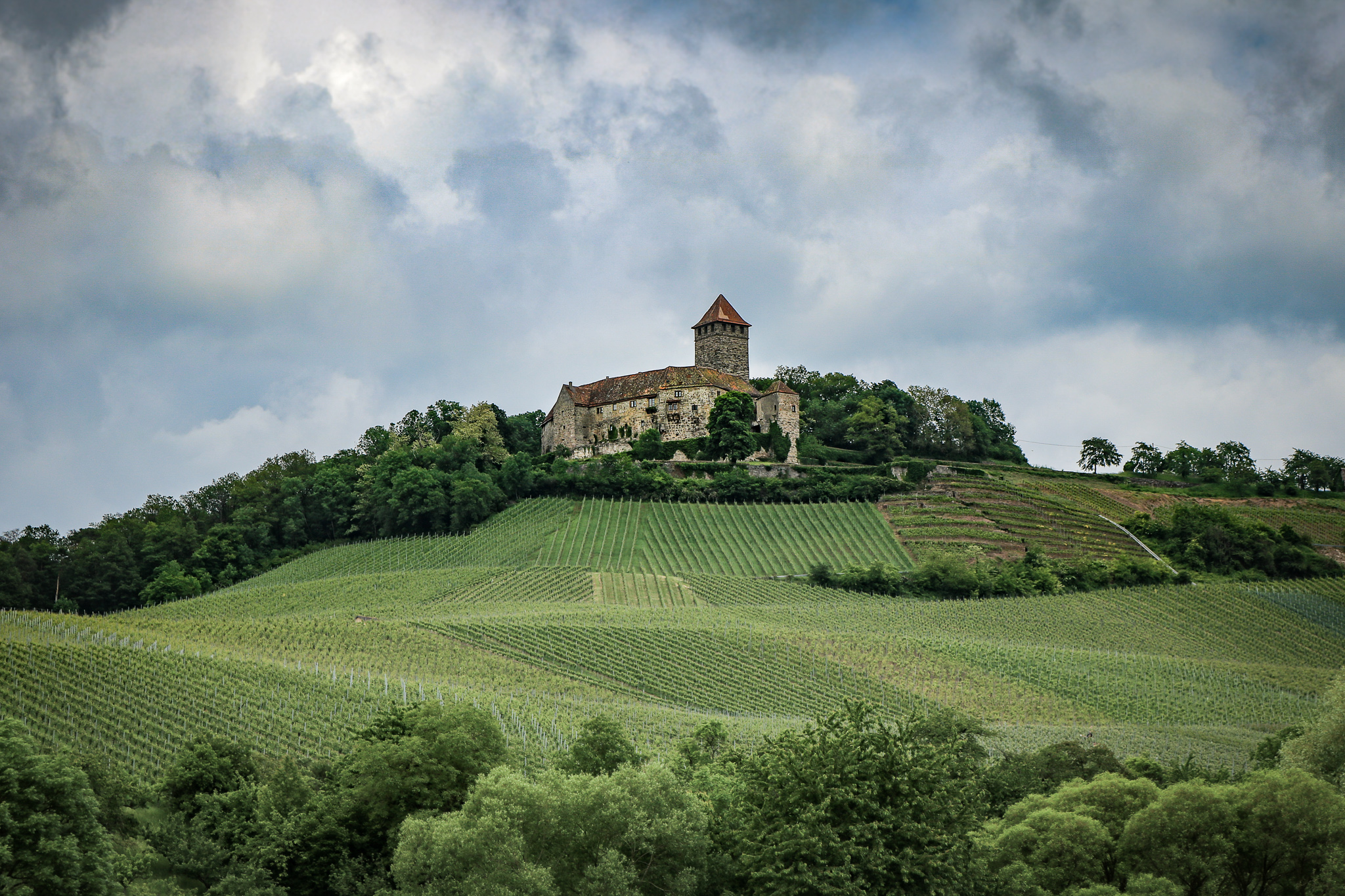

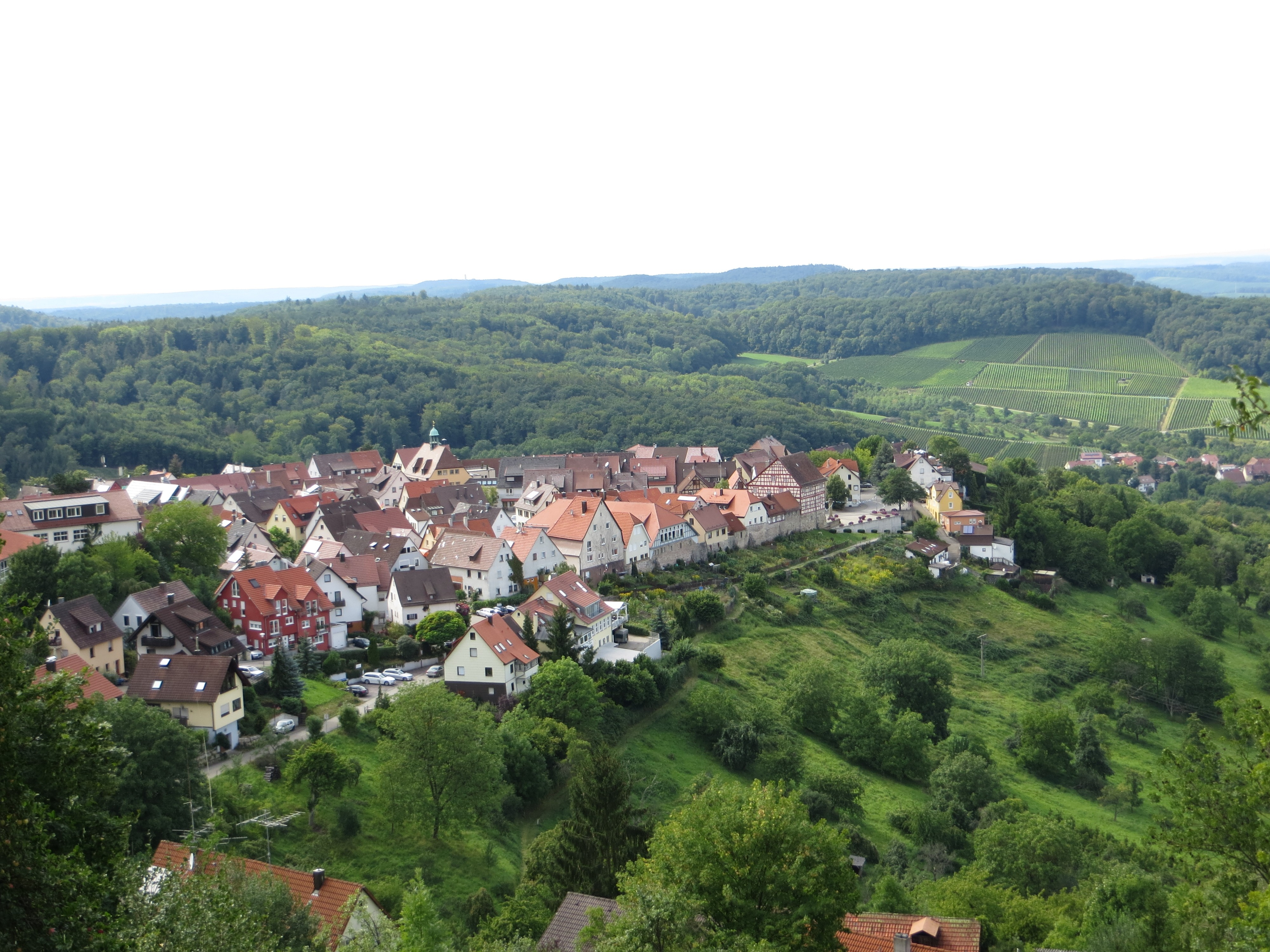
Towns and agriculture (Löwenstein)

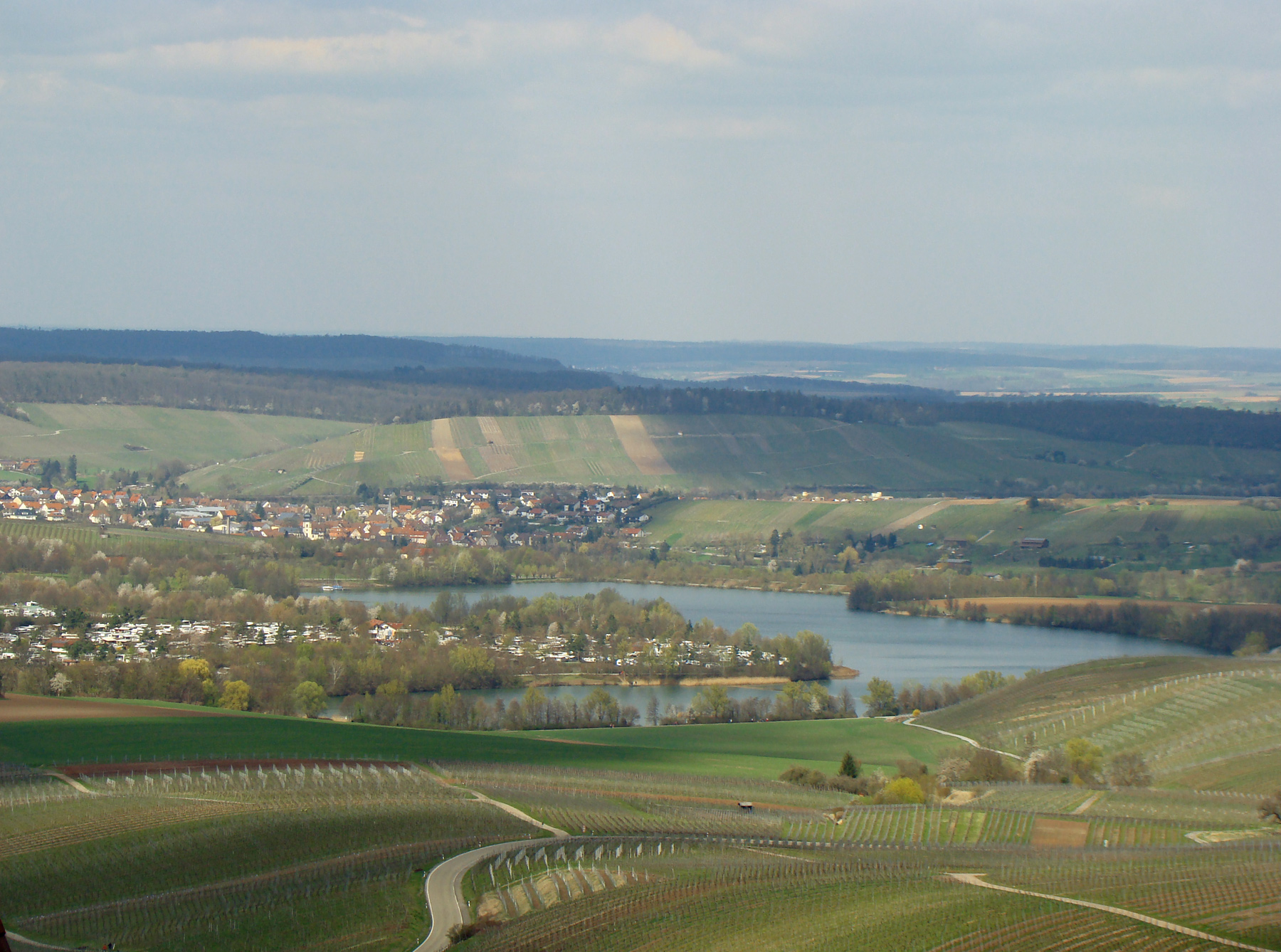
Large parts of the original forest has been swapped for agriculture

Naturpark Schwäbisch-Fränkischer Wald

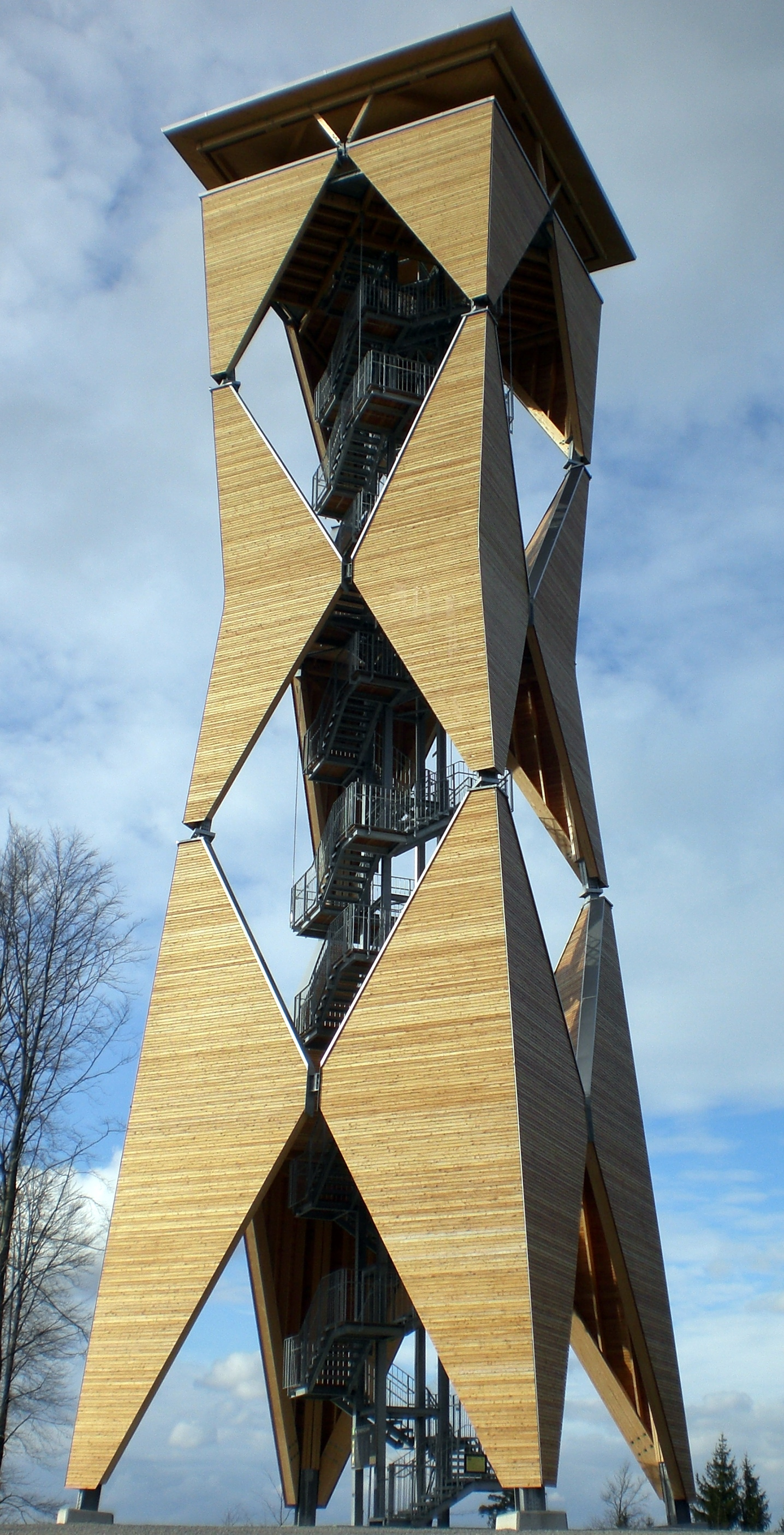
Altenbergturm, a lookout tower

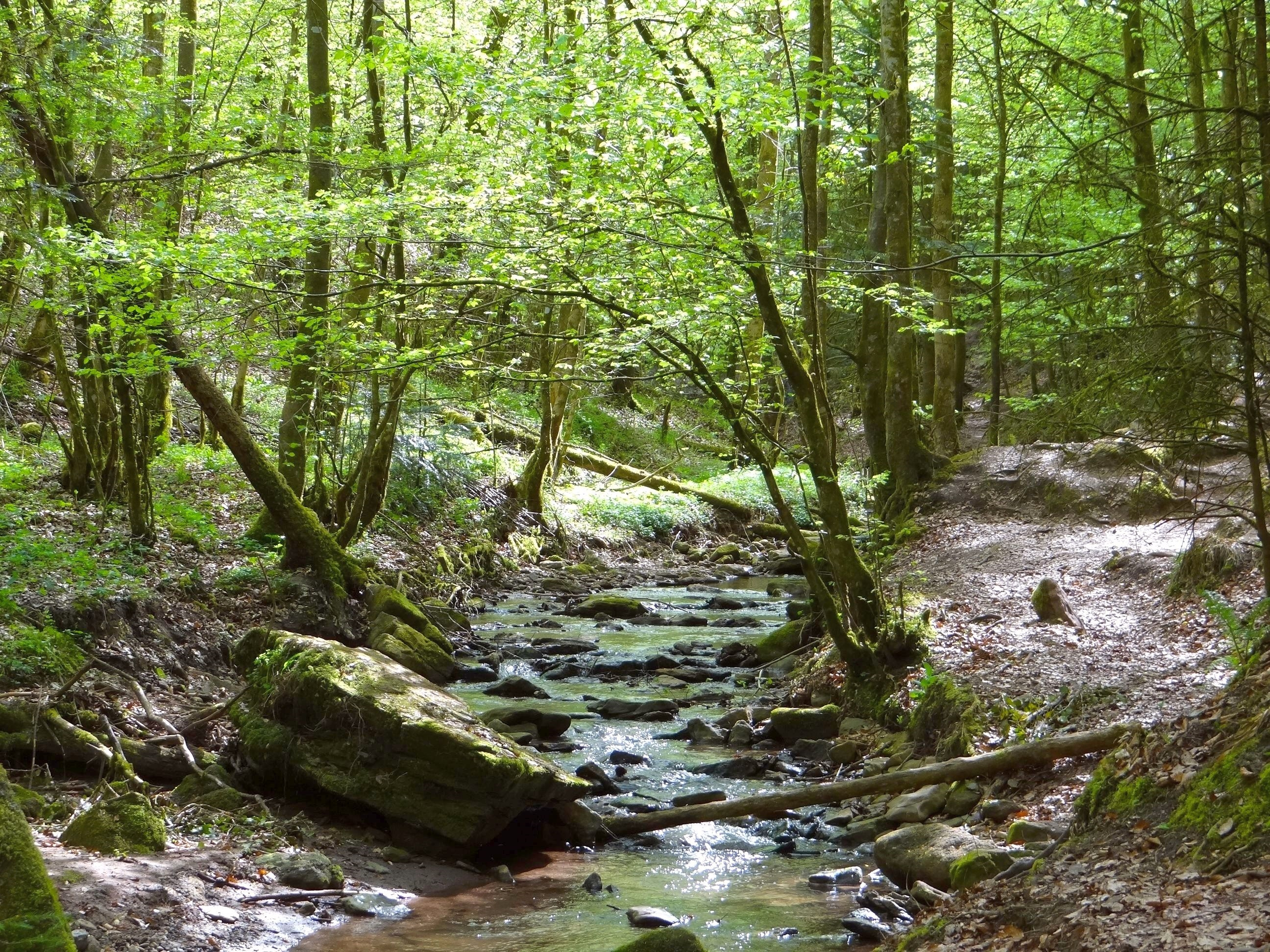
Forest stream

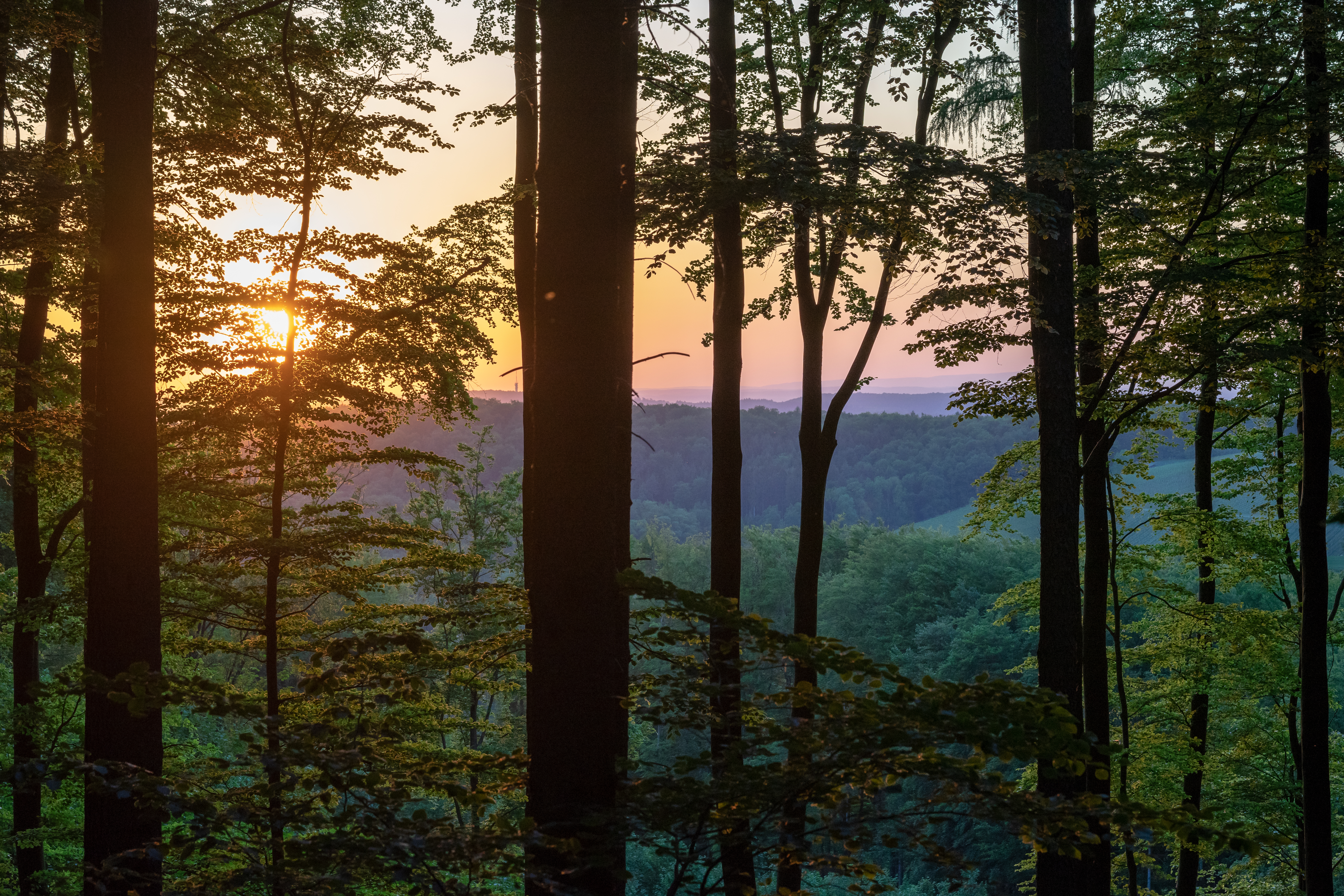

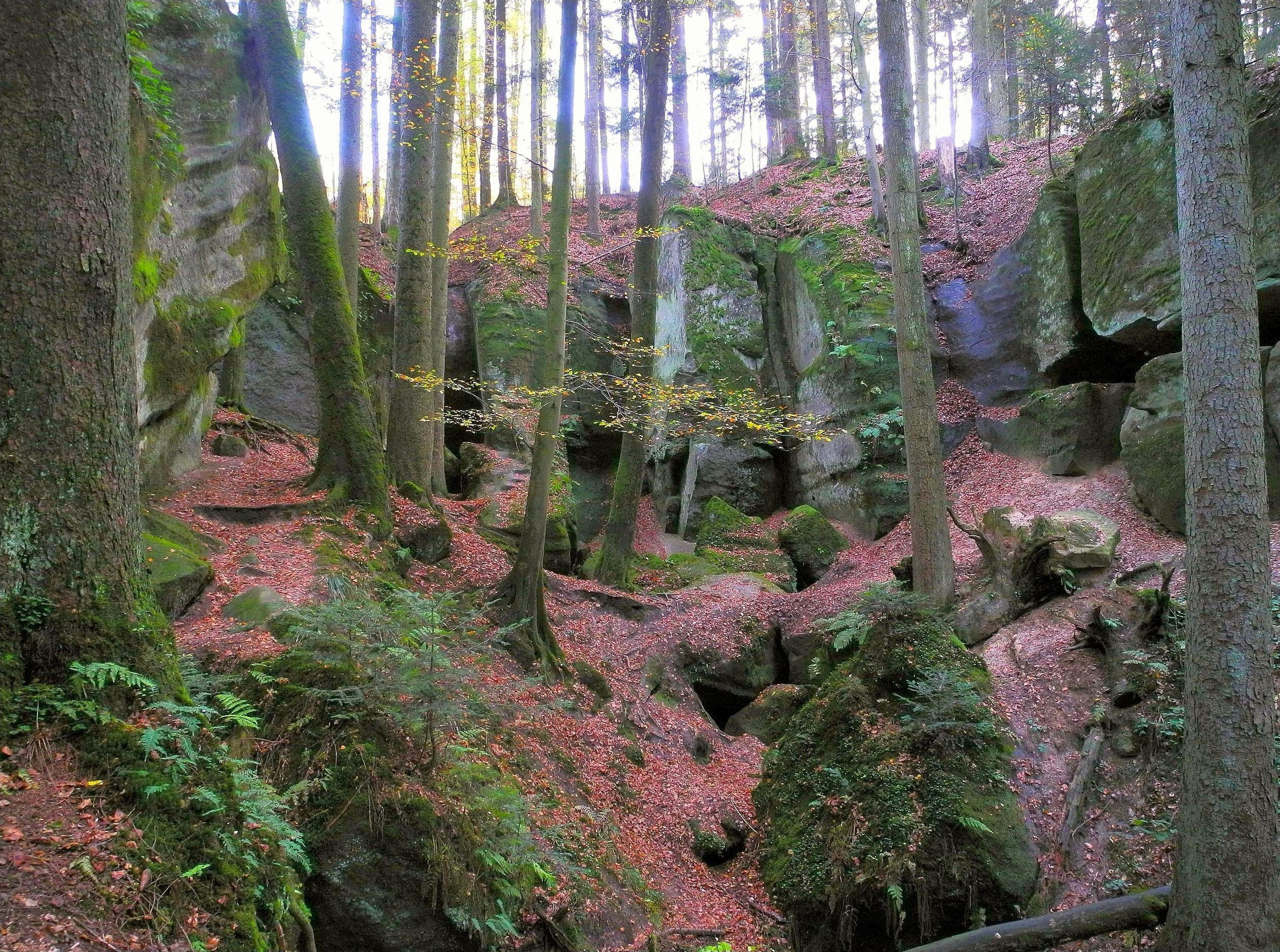
Autumn scene

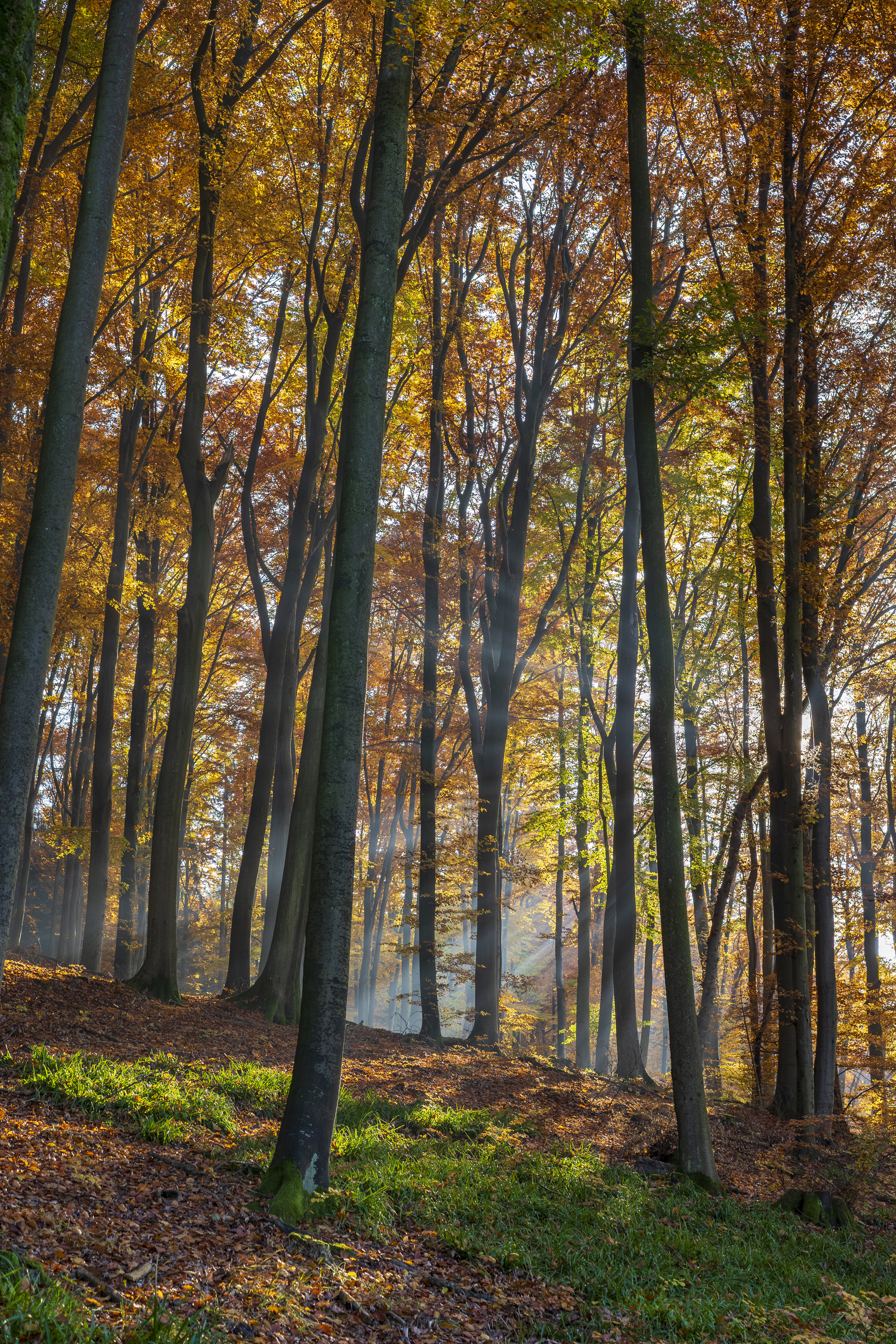
Autumn in the nature park

== Literature ==
- Paul Strähle (2006), Naturpark Schwäbisch-Fränkischer Wald : revised by Theo Müller (in German) (4th, revised and expanded ed.), Stuttgart: Theiss, ISBN 3-8062-2033-6
- LUBW Landesanstalt für Umwelt, Messungen und Naturschutz Baden-Württemberg (publ.): Naturführer Schwäbischer Wald. (Reihe Naturschutz-Spectrum. Gebiete, Vol. 29). verlag regionalkultur, Ubstadt-Weiher, 2007, ISBN 978-3-89735-507-1.
