= Mainhardt Forest =

Mainhardt Forest (Mainhardter Wald)
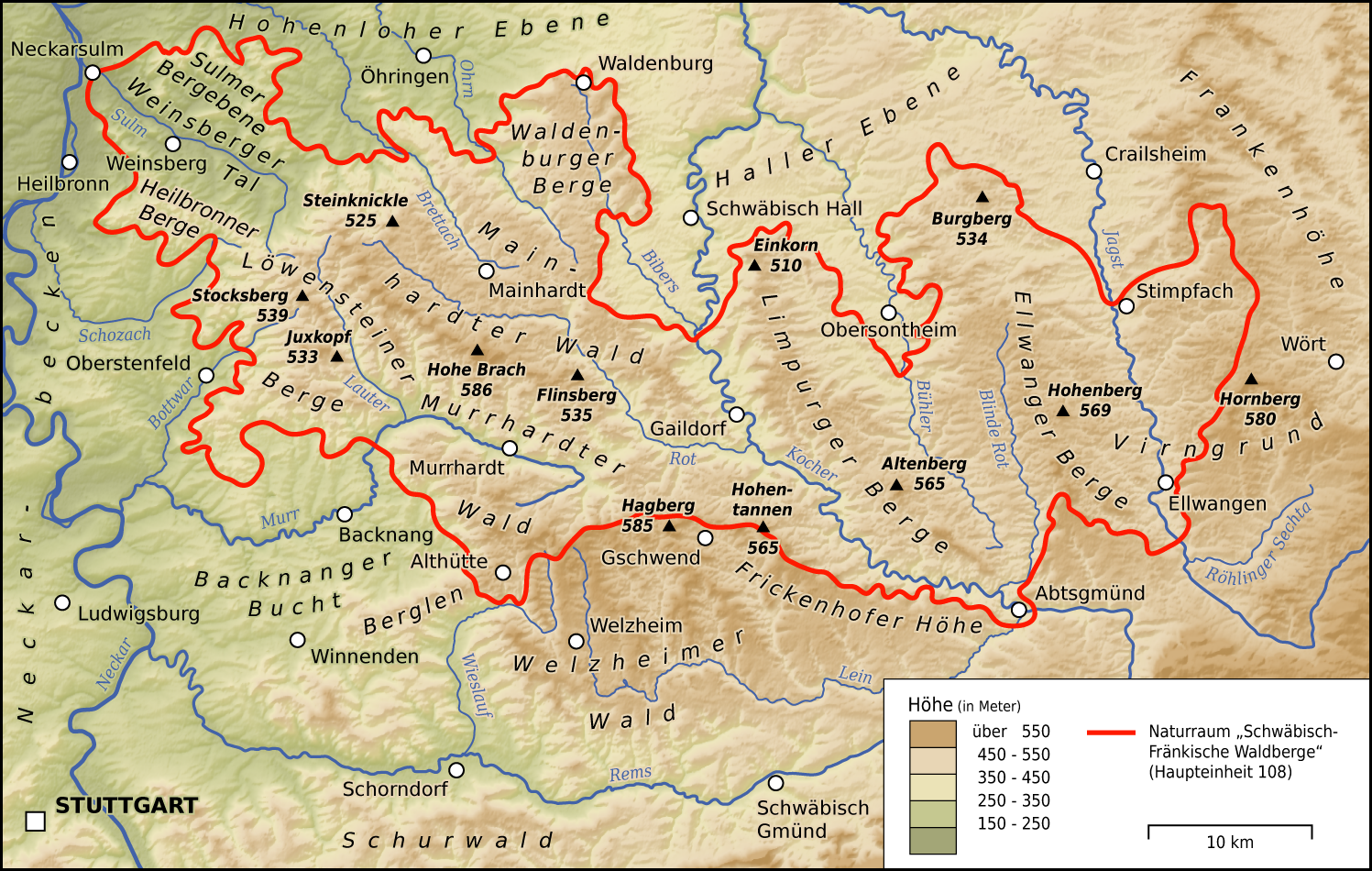
- The Mainhard Forest in the central western part of the Swabian-Franconian Forest

Highest point
- Peak: Hohe Brach
- Elevation: 586.4 m above NHN

Geography
- State(s): Rems-Murr-Kreis, Baden-Württemberg (Germany)
- Range coordinates: 49°22′10″N 9°33′00″E
- Parent range: Swabian-Franconian Forest

The Mainhardt Forest is a hill range up to 586.4 m above sea level (NHN) in the counties of Schwäbisch Hall and Heilbronn, Hohenlohekreis and Rems-Murr-Kreis in the German state of Baden-Württemberg. It is named after the municipality of Mainhardt that lies at its centre.

== Hills ==
The highest point of the Mainhardt Forest is the Hohe Brach (586.4 m) between the villages of Erlach and Grab in the municipality of Großerlach. Another hill in the range is the Steinknickle (524.9 m) near Wüstenrot. Near Großerlach the treeless kuppe of the Altwald (552.0 m) offers a view far across the Swabian-Franconian Forest. On the forested kuppe of the Flinsberg (also called the Flehnsberg) (534.8 m) near Oberrot are mighty outcrops of flint blocks. In the southeast the Mainhardt Forest runs between the valleys of the Rot and Kocher in a ridge called the Kirgel (459.4 m), on which there is an observation tower, the Kerner Tower. On its eastern perimeter near Westheim the Steinbühl (484.4 m) rises over the Kocher valley.

== Literature ==
- Egil Pastor: Die Räuber vom Mainhardter Wald: eine Kriminalgeschichte aus dem 18. Jahrhundert. Verlag Haller Tagblatt GmbH, 1986
- Schwäbischer Wald. Merian, 1968
- Fritz Schall: Waldpflege im Mainhardter Wald, in: Naturpark Schwäbisch-Fränkischer Wald. Special edition of the Allgemeine Forst Zeitschrift, No. 41/1980, pp. 1102f
