= Römerstein (mountain) =

Mountain in Baden-Württemberg, Germany

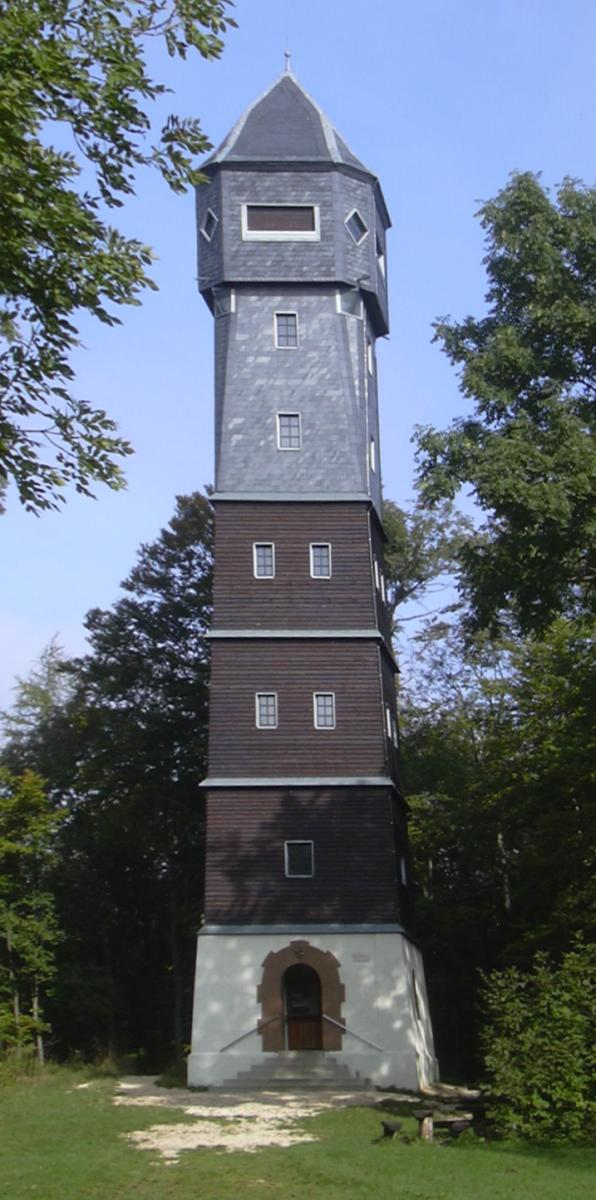
- Römerstein Tower

Highest point
- Elevation: 874 m (2,867 ft)
- Prominence: 70 m (230 ft)
- Isolation: 31.74 km (19.72 mi) to Bolberg
- Coordinates: 48°30′36″N 9°32′37″E

Geography
- Location within Baden-Württemberg
- Location: Baden-Württemberg, Germany

Römerstein is a mountain of Baden-Württemberg, Germany. It lies on a plateau, whose highest point is 874 metres (2,867 ft) above sea level.

The municipality of Römerstein in the district of Reutlingen, in which territory it lies, is named after it. Although the Romans in Donnstetten(Clarenna) settled immediately east of the mountain between AD 85-260, the name is not derived from them but from the name of the family Rem, which was established in the 14th Century in the region. The forested crest of the hill rises an average of only about 70 metres above its immediate surroundings, but due to its location (near the northwest Albtrauf, above the deep Lenninger Lautertal and by the falling south plateau) it offers excellent visibility.

== Lookout tower ==
At the highest point of the mountain is the 28-metre-high (92 ft) tower. This was built in 1912 by the Swabian Albverein (one of the oldest hiking clubs in Germany). The tower was designed as a timber boarded construction on a stone basement. From its viewing platform above the treetops to the north overlooks the Lauter and the Alp foothills to the Kaiser mountains. In the Northeast, the highest visible summit is Filstal; in the other directions the Swabian Alps can be seen.

The tower is open during the warm seasons, on weekends and holidays, at the foot of which is a barbecue area and playground equipment for children.
