= Rappeneck =

Mountain in Baden-Württemberg, Germany

Coordinates: 47°56′N 7°55′E

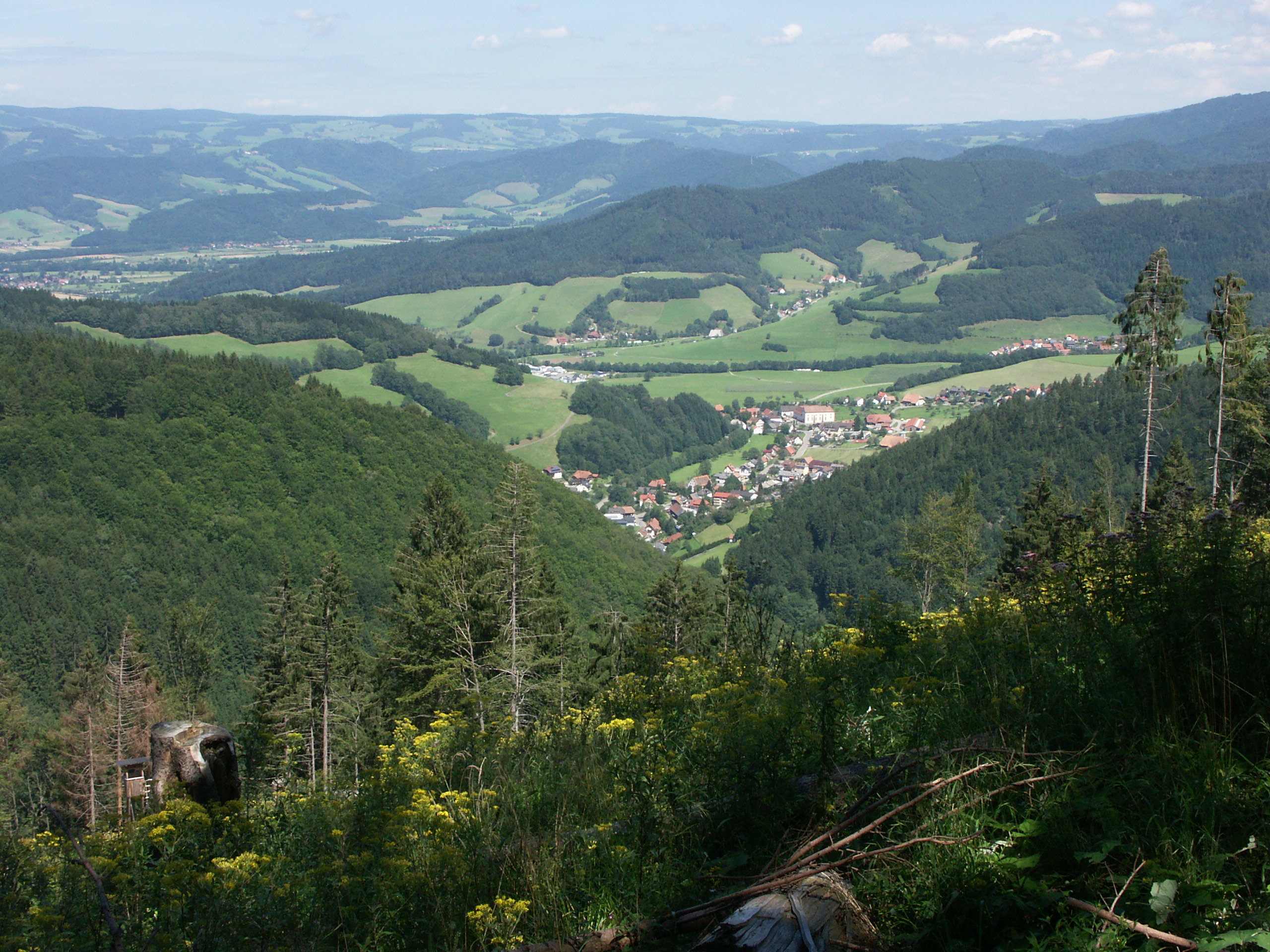
- View from Rappeneck looking in the direction of Oberried

Highest point
- Elevation: 1,010 m (3,310 ft)

Geography
- Location: Baden-Württemberg, Germany

Rappeneck is a mountain of Baden-Württemberg, Germany.
