= Stiefelhöhe =

Mountain in Baden-Württemberg, Germany

Coordinates: 49°31′N 8°48′E

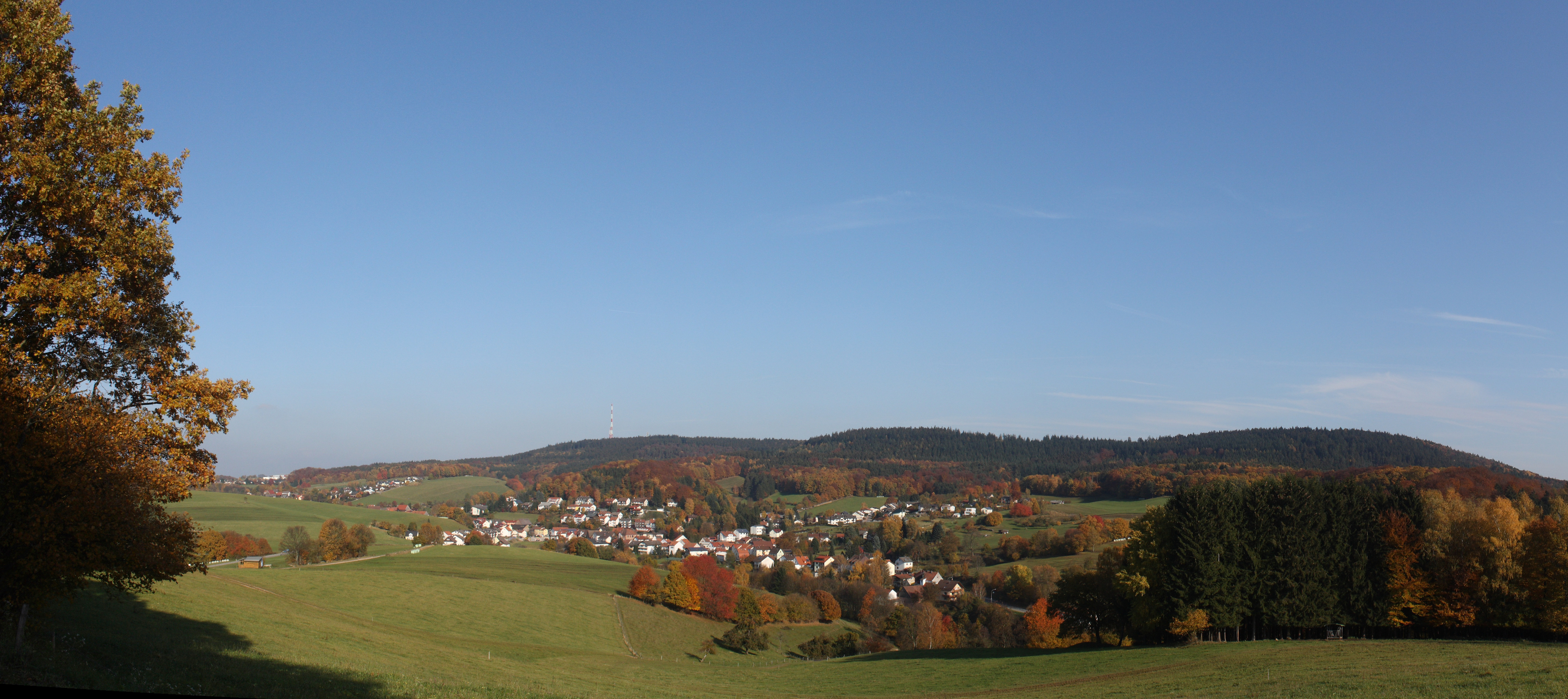
- Unter-Abtsteinach, behind it Hardberg, Zentwald and Stiefelhöhe (from left).

Highest point
- Elevation: 584 m (1,916 ft)

Geography
- Location: Baden-Württemberg, Germany

Stiefelhöhe is an Odenwald mountain of Baden-Württemberg, Germany.
