= Kinzert =

Mountain in Baden-Württemberg, Germany

Coordinates: 49°32′N 9°07′E

Highest point
- Elevation: 553 m (1,814 ft)

Geography
- Location: Baden-Württemberg, Germany

Kinzert is a mountain of Baden-Württemberg, Germany.
