= Altdorf Forest =

Forested mountain ridge in Baden-Württemberg, Germany

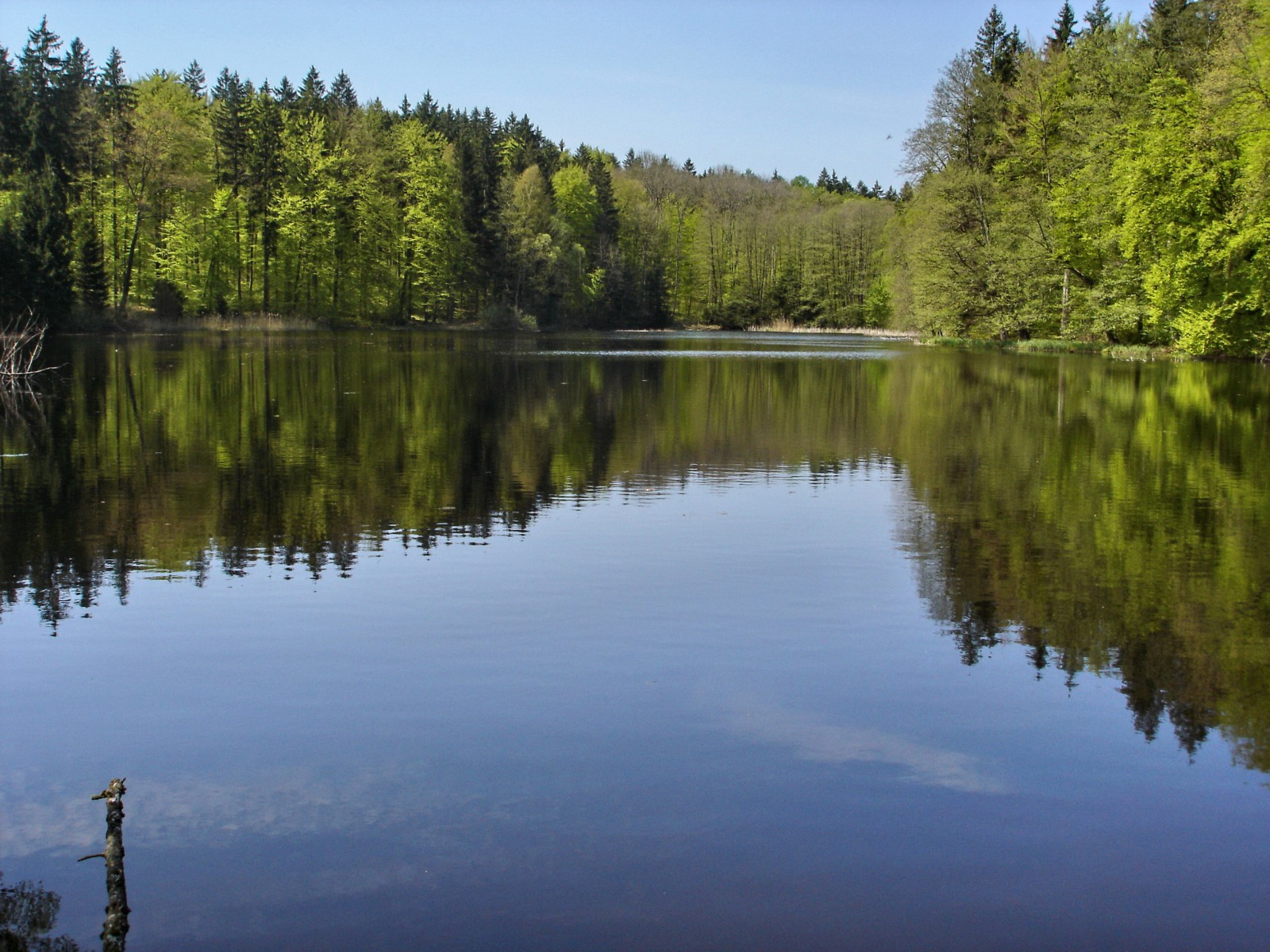

Highest point
- Peak: Galgenberg
- Elevation: 776.6 m above NHN

Geography
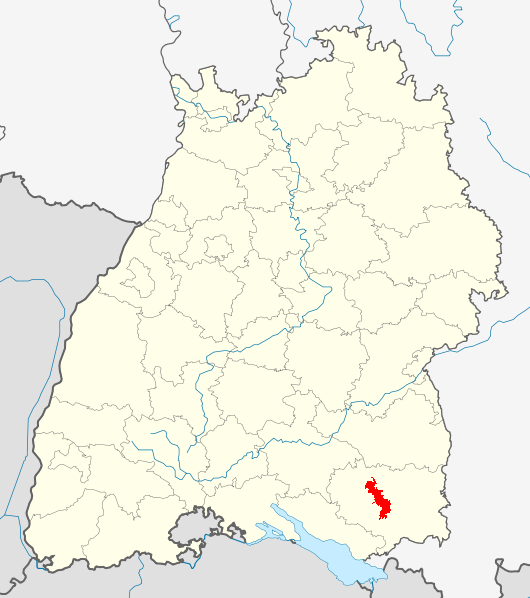
- Location: between Aulendorf and Vogt; county of Ravensburg, Baden-Württemberg (Germany)
- Range coordinates: 47°46′28″N 9°43′33″E

The Altdorf Forest (German: Altdorfer Wald) is a forested, low mountain ridge between Aulendorf and Vogt in the county of Ravensburg in the German state of Baden-Württemberg. It is up to 776.6 m above sea level (NHN) high.

The forest has an area of about 82 km^{2} and is thus the largest contiguous forest in Upper Swabia. It is divided into state, municipal and private forests, of which the aristocratic House of Waldburg-Wolfegg owns the largest area.

== Literature ==
- Anton Huber: Beiträge zur Geschichte des Altdorfer Waldes. Staatliches Forstamt, Ravensburg, 1998
- Jochen Jauch: Geschichte und Geschichten aus dem Altdorfer Wald. Von der Försterei Gambach zum Forstrevier Bergatreute. Eppe, Bergatreute, 2012, ISBN 978-3-89089-153-8
- Volker Kracht (ed.): Die Naturschutzgebiete im Regierungsbezirk Tübingen. 2nd edition. Thorbecke, Ostfildern, 2006, ISBN 978-3-7995-5175-5 (includes coverage of the few nature reserves in the Altdorf Forest)
- J. D. G. von Memminger: Der Altdorfer Wald, in: Beschreibung des Oberamts Ravensburg. Cotta, Stuttgart and Tübingen, 1836 (e-text and digital version at Wikisource)
- Der Altdorfer Wald, in: Allgemeine Forst und Jagdzeitung, 9th annual issue, 1840, pp. 424ff. (digitalised)
