= Hornberg (Virngrund) =

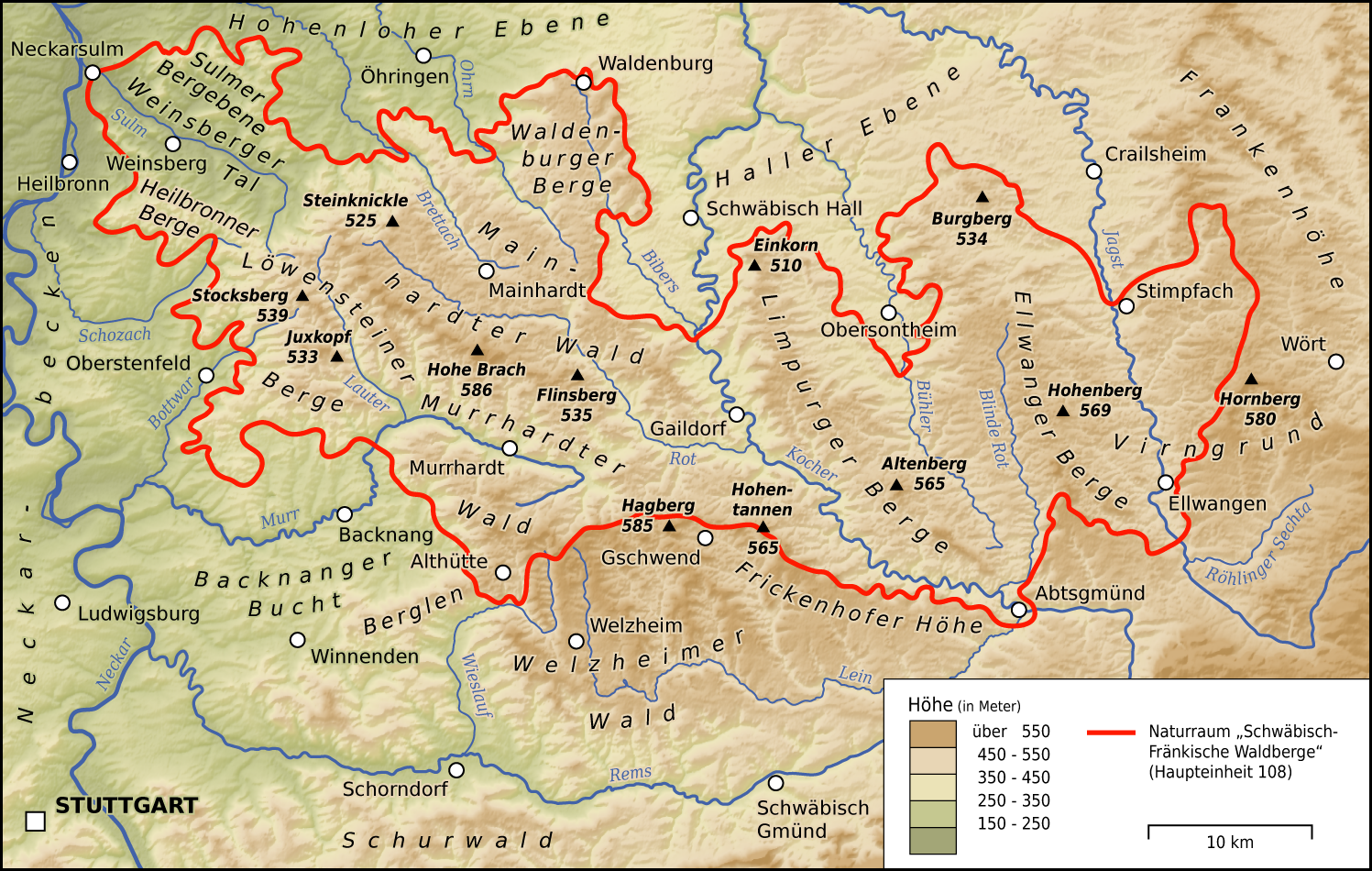
- The Hornberg in the east of the Virngrund region, east of the natural region of the Swabian-Franconian Forest

Highest point
- Elevation: 580 m above sea level (NHN) (1,902.9 ft)
- Isolation: 12.83 km (7.97 mi) to Hornsberg
- Coordinates: 49°01′16″N 10°12′03″E

Geography
- Location within Baden-Württemberg
- Location: Near Ellenberg; Ostalbkreis, Baden-Württemberg, Germany
- Parent range: Virngrund

The Hornberg is a hill ridge, about 2.5 kilometres long, with three kuppen that reaches a maximum height of 580 m above sea level (NHN) making it the highest point of the Virngrund region in the German state of Baden-Württemberg.

== Location and shape ==
The ridge is a continuation of the small plateau around Ellenberg in the Württemberg county of Ostalbkreis, with which it is only linked by a narrow strip of land as a result of valleys to the west and east. It then runs west and in an increasing curve towards the west, finally heading southwest. Compared with the plateau it is only slightly, or even insignificantly prominent, the aforementioned valleys and, especially the northern foreland around Georgenstadt, however, lie some 60–80 metres lower down. Its three kuppen follow one another on the gently sloping ridgeline on the upper right, along which a forest track runs. The car driver on the A 7 encounters the Hornberg as a forested and under-tunnelled hill ridge between the motorway junction of Dinkelsbühl/Fichtenau to the north and the motorway services of Ellwanger Berge ("Ellwangen Hills") to the south.

Description of the kuppen with their heights above Normalhöhennull (NHN) and geocoordinates:

=== Northeast Kuppe ===
(579 m, 49°1′11.2″N 10°12′44″E)
To the north is the hillside forest, to the south is open pasture. In addition to a transmission site here, there is also a small football pitch (Bolzplatz) and 3 tennis courts.. Just under 450 m south-southeast on the other side of the landbridge to the Ellenberg Plateau stands the Ellenberg water tower (150 m³ capacity, 29 m high), which has an observation platform.

=== Middle Kuppe ===
(580.0 m, Kuppe 49°1′16″N 10°12′3″E)
To the north is the hillside forest, to the south is open pasture. From here on, heading west, the ridge is entirely wooded. On it stands a transmission site and a water tank. The A 7 motorway crosses under the Hornberg just under 250 m further west of this point through the Virngrund Tunnel.

=== Southwest Kuppe ===
(570.1 m, 49°0′55″N 10°11′17″E)
It is forested and lies some way away from the developed linking path. The lowest of the three summits, thanks to its position on the crest of the ridge, it rises almost everywhere above the surrounding area.
