= Rohrenkopf =

Mountain in Germany

- Location within Baden-Württemberg

Highest point
- Elevation: 1,170 m (3,840 ft)
- Coordinates: 47°42′47″N 07°55′38″E

Geography
- Location: Baden-Württemberg, Germany
- Parent range: Black Forest

The Rohrenkopf is a mountain, 1,169.8 m above sea level (NHN) high, in the Southern Black Forest in Germany. It rises within the parish of Gersbach, a village in the borough of Schopfheim.

== Geography ==
To the southwest is the county town (Kreisstadt) of Lörrach, 32 kilometres away.

The Rohrenkopf is Gersbach's highest point. In good weather the Swiss Alps may be seen, including the trio of the Eiger, Mönch and Jungfrau.
