= Katzenbuckel =

Mountain in the Odenwald, Germany

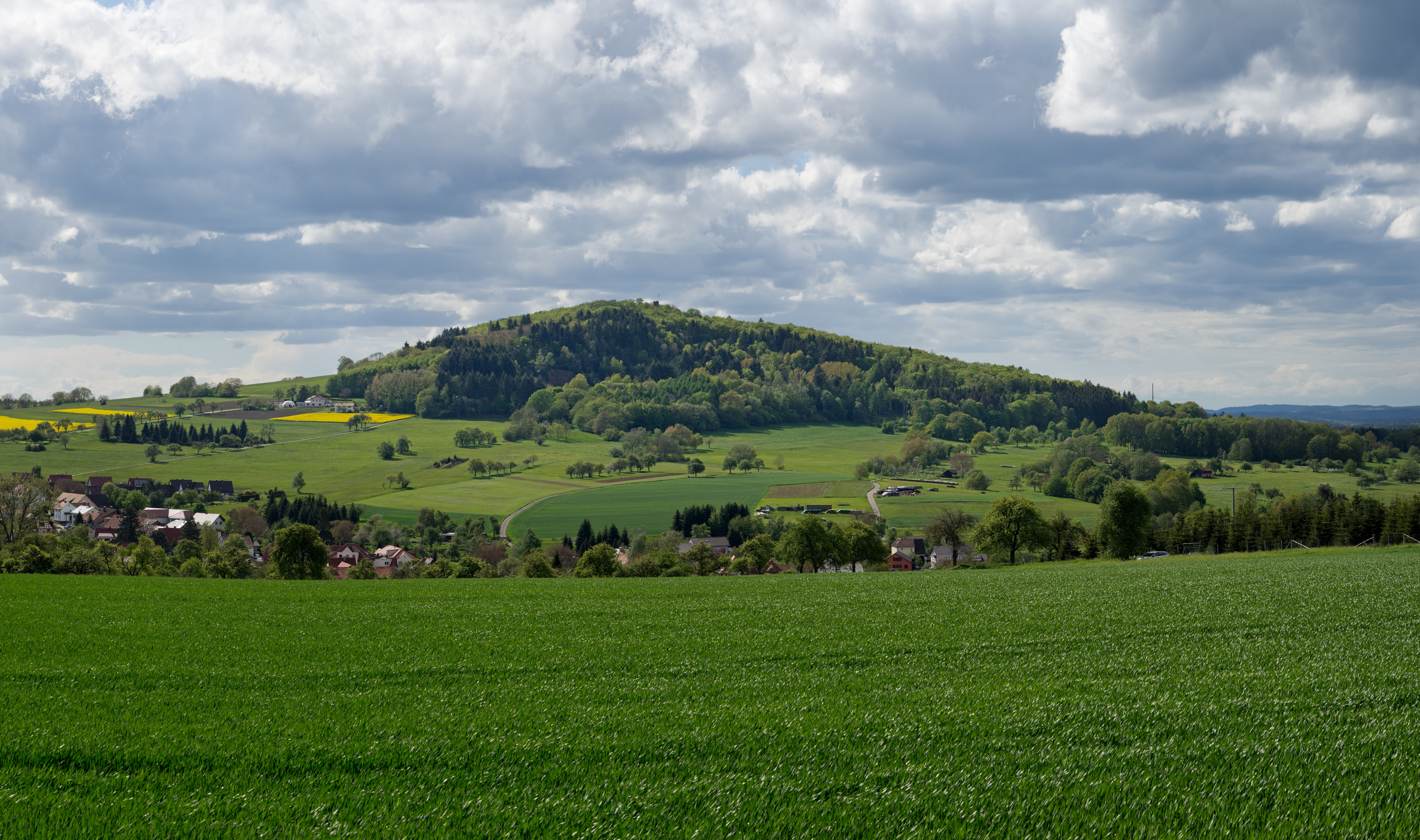
- View to the Katzenbuckel

Highest point
- Elevation: 626 m (2,054 ft)
- Isolation: 71 km (44 mi)
- Coordinates: 49°28′15″N 9°02′28″E

Naming
- English translation: Cat's arched back
- Language of name: German

Geography
- Location within Baden-Württemberg
- Location: Baden-Württemberg, Germany
- Parent range: Odenwald

The Katzenbuckel (German pronunciation: [ˈkatsn̩ˌbʊkl̩]; 626 metres) is an extinct volcano and the highest elevation in the Odenwald region of southwest Germany. The mountain is located eastwards of Eberbach, near the village of Waldbrunn. At the top of the Katzenbuckel is an 18-m-high lookout, built out of sandstone. If the weather is good, it is possible to see the Donnersberg (83 km away) and the surrounding secondary mountains (Taunus). When the view is exceptionally clear, it is theoretically possible to see the Kreuzberg (120 km away) in the Rhön. It translates directly into 'cat hump'.

Panoramic view from the tower on the summit
