= Kernen (hill) =

Hill in Baden-Württemberg, Germany

Coordinates: 48°47′N 9°19′E

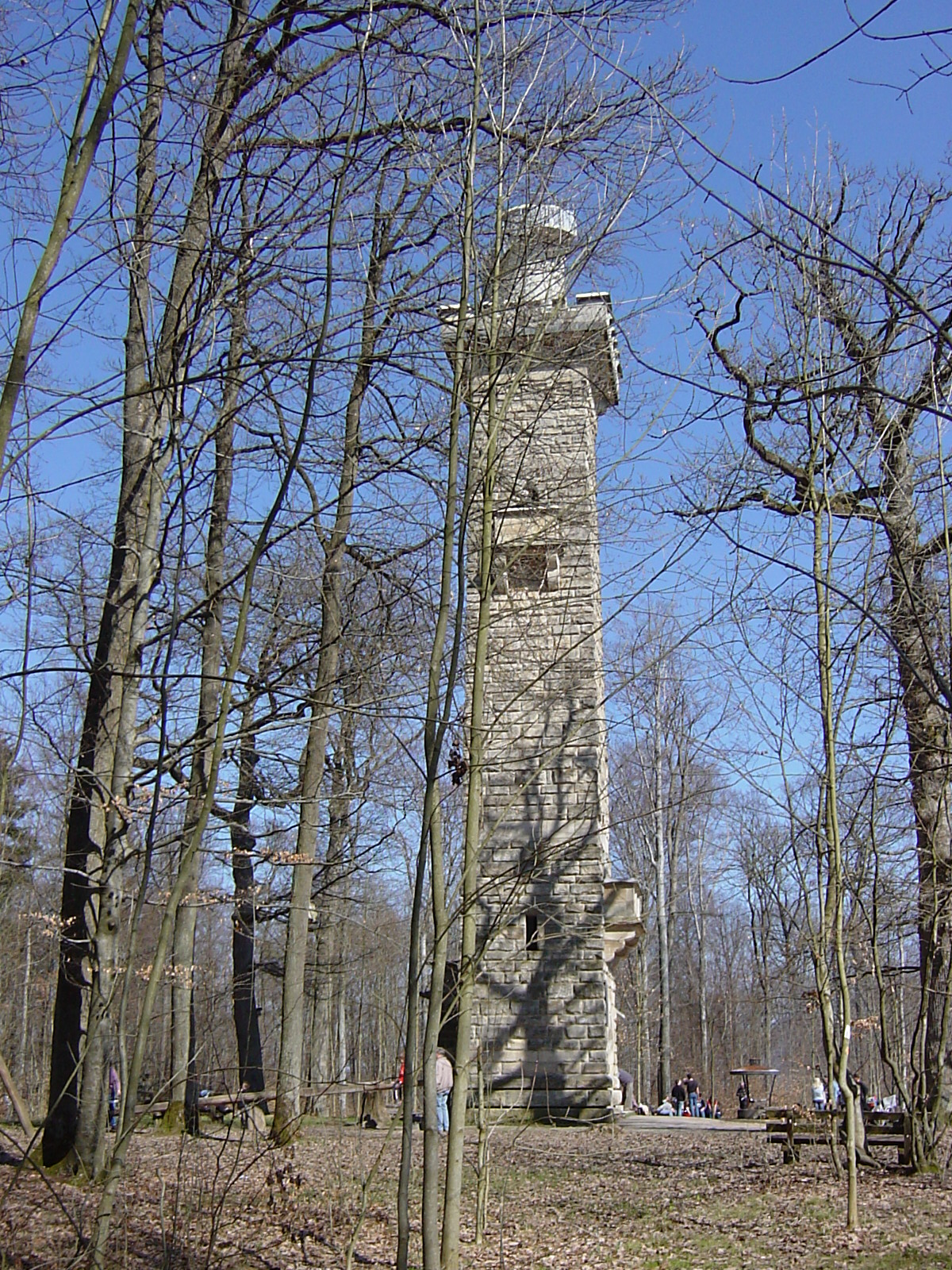

Highest point
- Elevation: 513.2 m (1,684 ft)

Geography
- Location: Baden-Württemberg, Germany

Kernen is a mountain of Baden-Württemberg, Germany.
