= Hagberg (Welzheim Forest) =

Hill in Baden-Württemberg, Germany

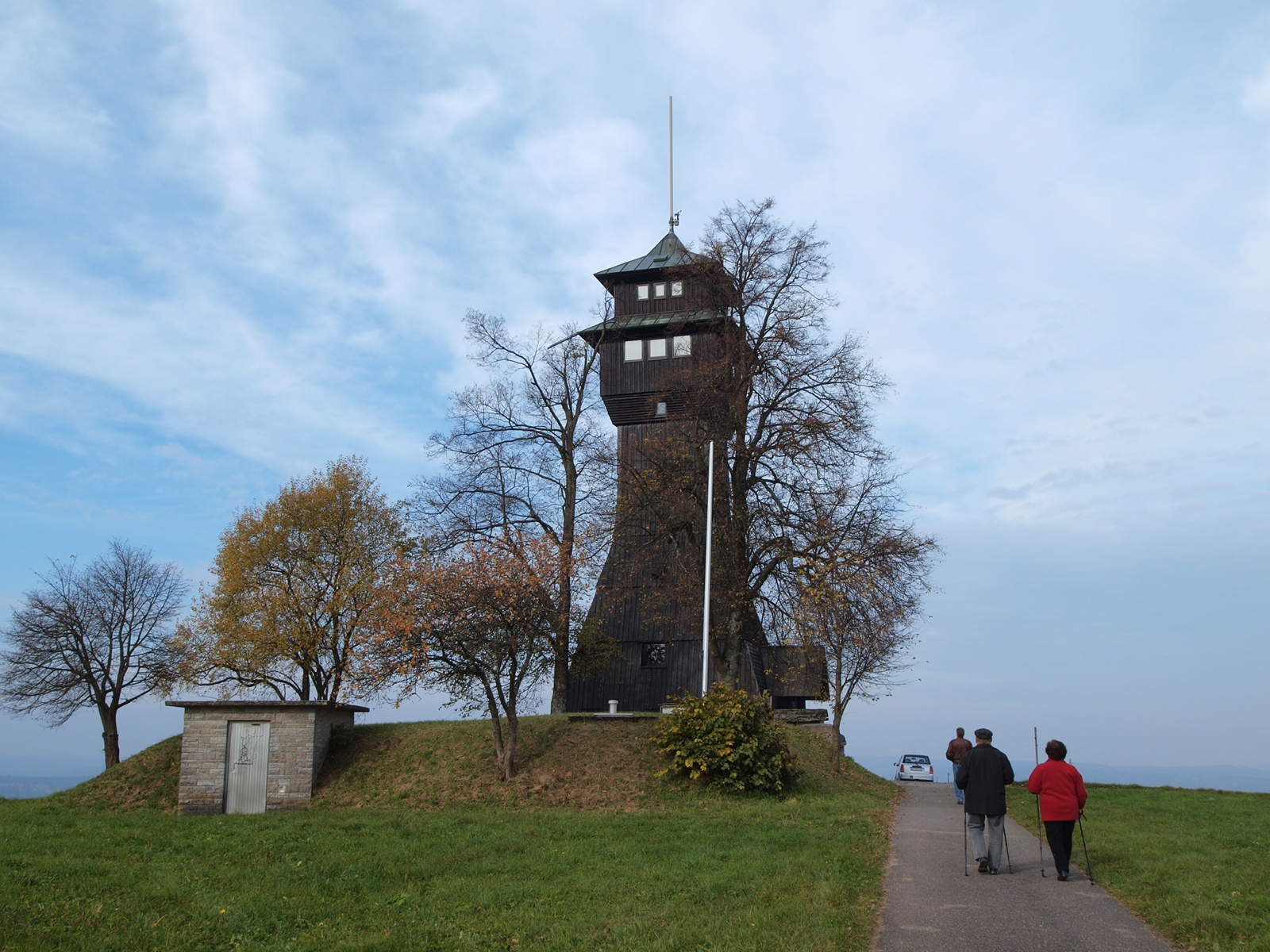
- The tower on the Hagberg

Highest point
- Elevation: 582.2 m above sea level (NN) (1,910 ft)
- Coordinates: 48°56′24″N 9°42′40″E

Geography
- Location within Baden-Württemberg
- Location: Baden-Württemberg, Germany
- Parent range: Welzheim Forest

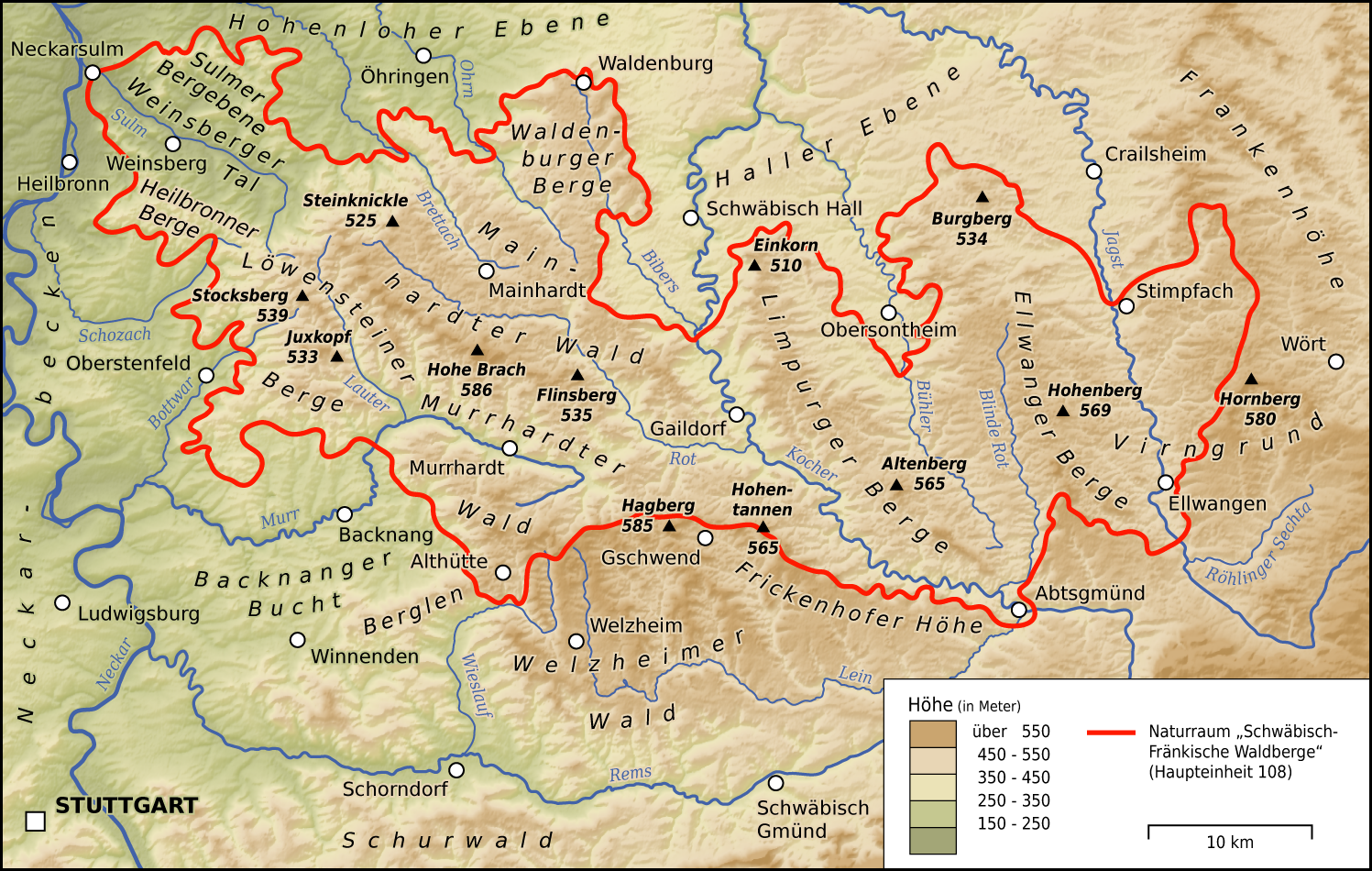
Map showing the Hagberg south of the Swabian-Franconian Forest

The Hagberg is a hill, 585.2 m above sea level (NN), in the county of Ostalbkreis in the German state of Baden-Württemberg. It is the second highest point of the Swabian-Franconian Forest, a natural region and forested hill range in the northeast of the state. In former times the Hagberg (as e. g. the Asperg and the Hesselberg) formed part of the border between the Swabians and Franks.

== Location ==
The Hagberg lies 2.4 km (as the crow flies) west of the municipality of Gschwend in the Welzheim Forest.

== Observation tower ==
The Hagberg Tower (Hagbergturm) is a 23-metre-high observation tower on the Hagberg that is constructed of wood on a reinforced concrete pedestal. It is crowned by two pagoda-like structures and is visible for miles around. A first tower was erected on the hill in 1901, but even before the First World War it had been replaced by the tower in its present form. In 1936 it was acquired by the Schwäbischer Albverein, which still maintains it today. During the Second World War the Luftwaffe established an observation post in the tower. At that time the upper pagoda was removed. In 1949 the tower was renovated, in 1973 it had to be closed, however, due to its state of disrepair. In 1979/80 it was rebuilt in its original shape and opened again on 21 June 1980.

From the two observation platforms there are views in good weather as far as Stuttgart, Heilbronn, Crailsheim and Aalen. From Easter to the end of October the Hagberg Tower is open on Sundays and holidays. On other days it may be opened on request to Gschwend Branch of the Jura Club. 500 metres away is a car park. The tower also acts as the starting point for walks in the densely forested region around Gschwend.
