= Hohbäumle =

Mountain in Baden-Württemberg, Germany

Coordinates: 48°00′23″N 9°53′29″E

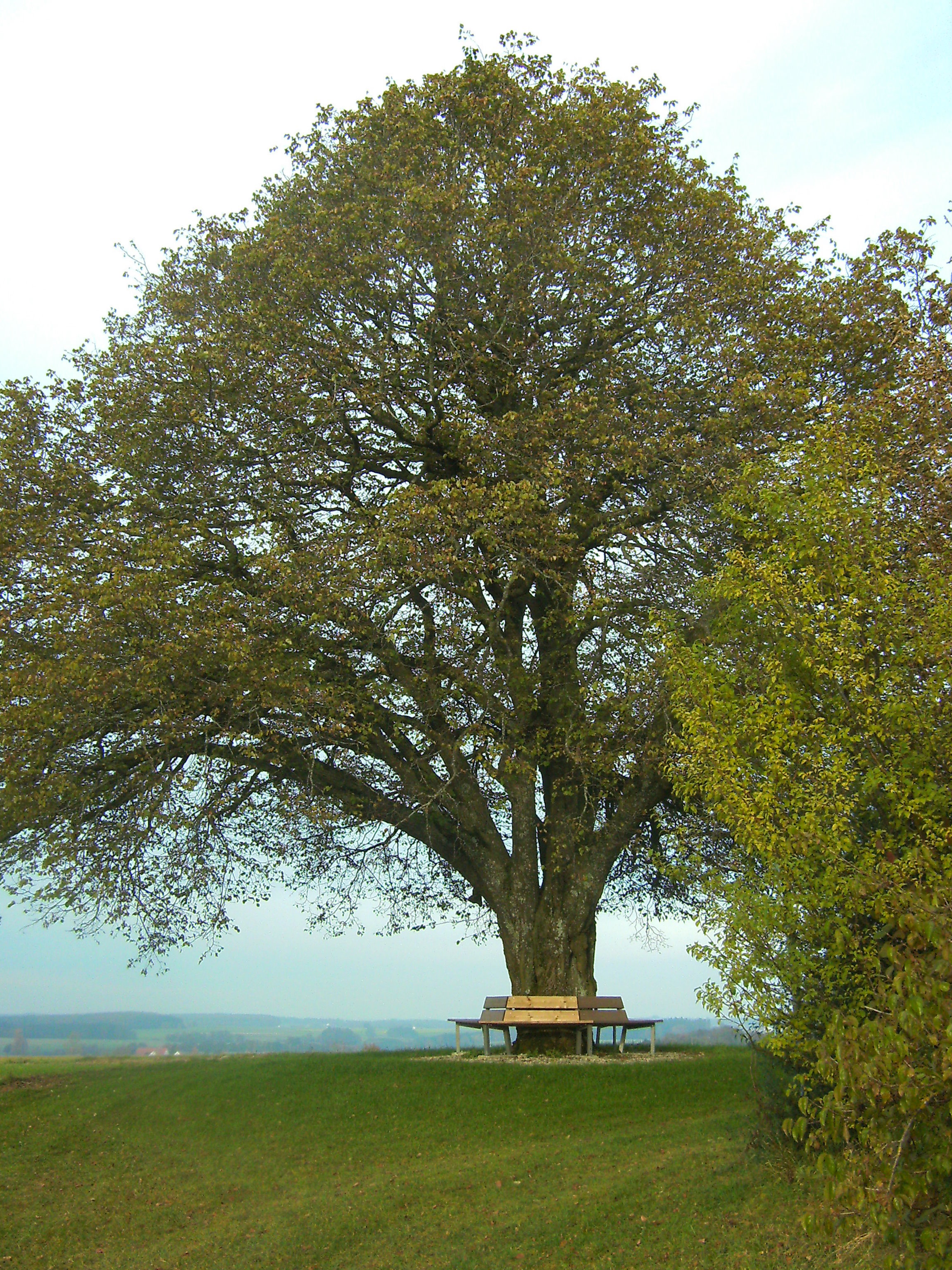
- Hohbäumle

Highest point
- Elevation: 712 m (2,336 ft)

Geography
- Location: Baden-Württemberg, Germany

Hohbäumle is a mountain of Baden-Württemberg, Germany.
