= Wagenhart =

Mountain in Baden-Württemberg, Germany

Coordinates: 47°57′14″N 9°27′43″E

Highest point
- Elevation: 697.9 m (2,290 ft)

Geography
- Location: Baden-Württemberg, Germany

Wagenhart is a mountain of Baden-Württemberg, Germany.
