= Hohe Brach =

Coordinates: 49°02′N 9°33′E

Highest point
- Elevation: 586.4 m (1,924 ft)
- Isolation: 34.67 km (21.54 mi) to Hohenstaufen

Geography
- Location: Baden-Württemberg, Germany

Hohe Brach is a mountain near Großerlach in Baden-Württemberg, Germany. It has an elevation of 586 metres and a telecommunications tower that is 133 metres tall with an excellent view of Stuttgart.
