= Stocksberg (hill) =

Hill in Baden-Württemberg, Germany

Coordinates: 49.0669°N 9.4033°E

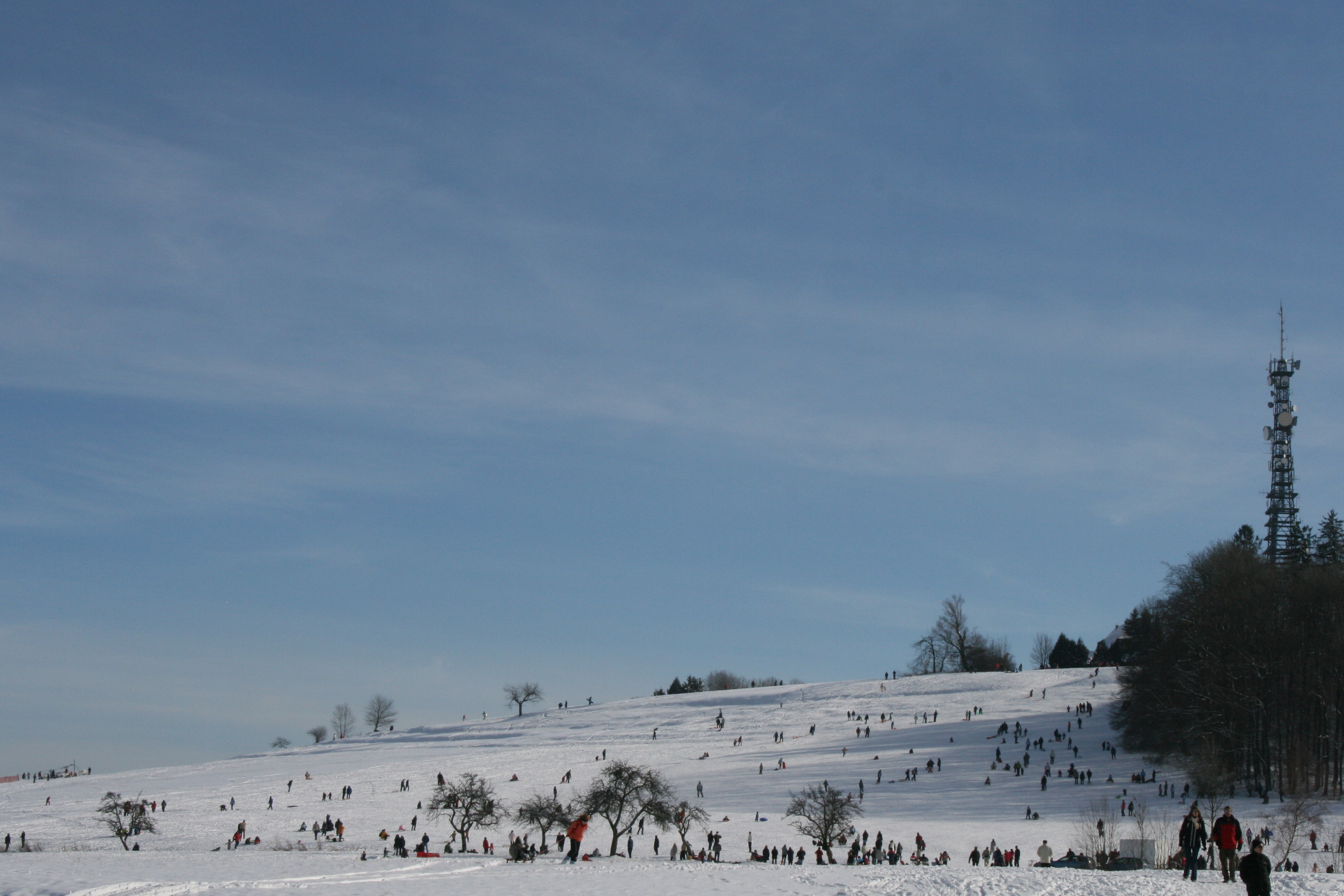
- Winter sports on the Stocksberg.

Highest point
- Elevation: 538.9 m (1,768 ft)

Geography
- Location: Baden-Württemberg, Germany

Stocksberg is a hill of Baden-Württemberg, Germany.
