= Großerlach =

- Municipality
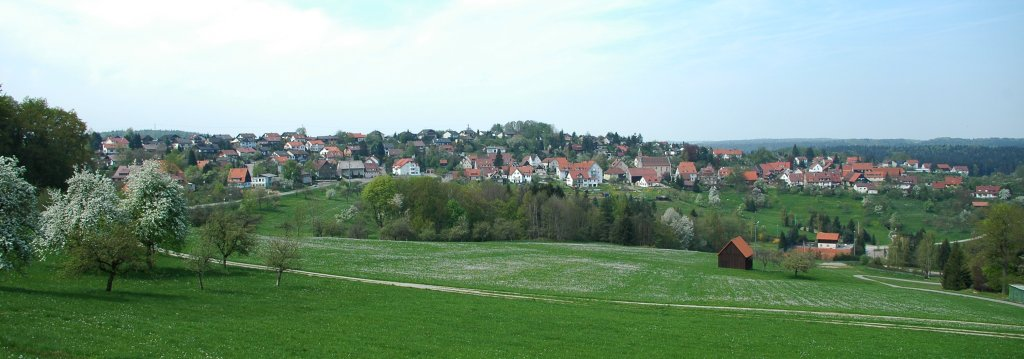

- Coat of arms

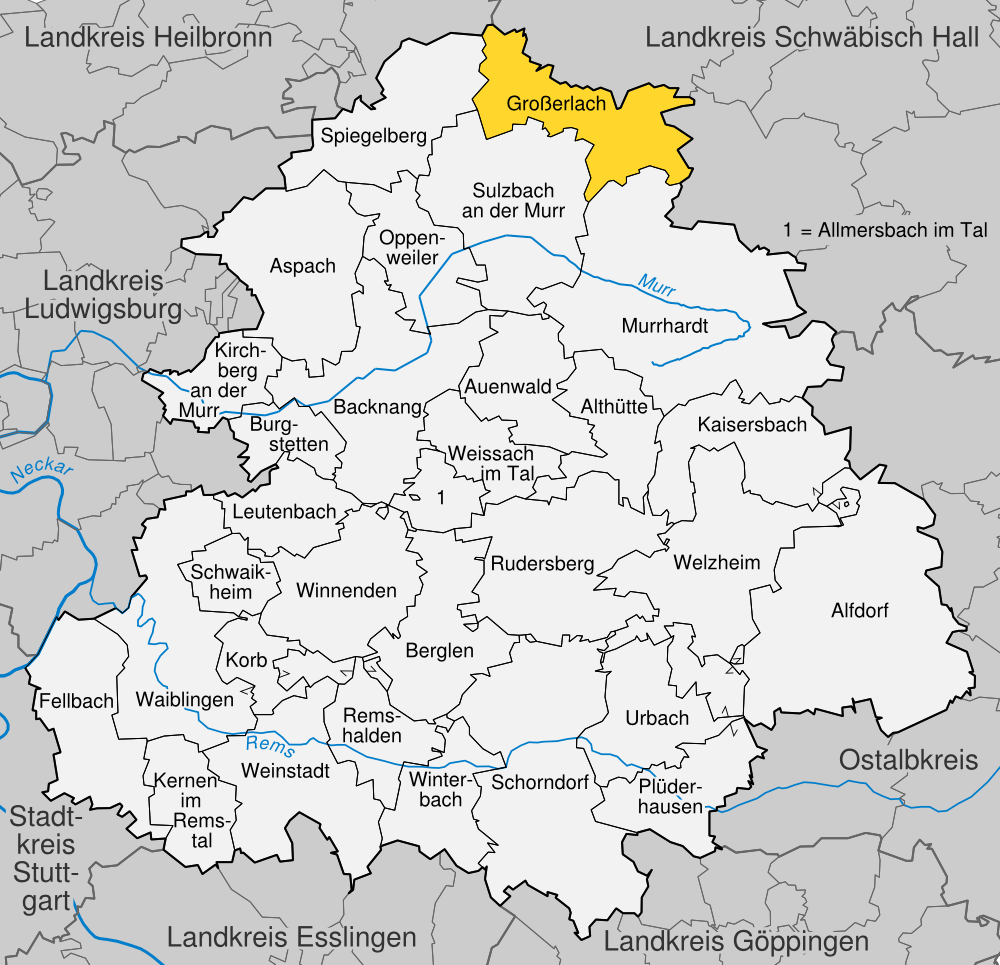
- Location of Großerlach within Rems-Murr-Kreis district
- Interactive map of Großerlach
- Location within Germany Location within Baden-Württemberg
- Coordinates: 49°03′12″N 09°30′52″E
- Country: Germany
- State: Baden-Württemberg
- Admin. region: Stuttgart
- District: Rems-Murr-Kreis

Government
  - Mayor (2024–32): Kevin Dispan

Area
  - Total: 27.14 km^{2} (10.48 sq mi)
- Elevation: 522 m (1,713 ft)

Population (2025-12-31)
  - Total: 2,764
  - Density: 101.8/km^{2} (263.8/sq mi)
- Time zone: UTC+01:00 (CET)
  - Summer (DST): UTC+02:00 (CEST)
- Postal codes: 71577
- Dialling codes: 07903
- Vehicle registration: WN
- Website: www.grosserlach.de

Großerlach is a municipality in the district of Rems-Murr in Baden-Württemberg in Germany.
