= Steinknickle =

Mountain in Germany

Coordinates: 49°07′N 9°29′E

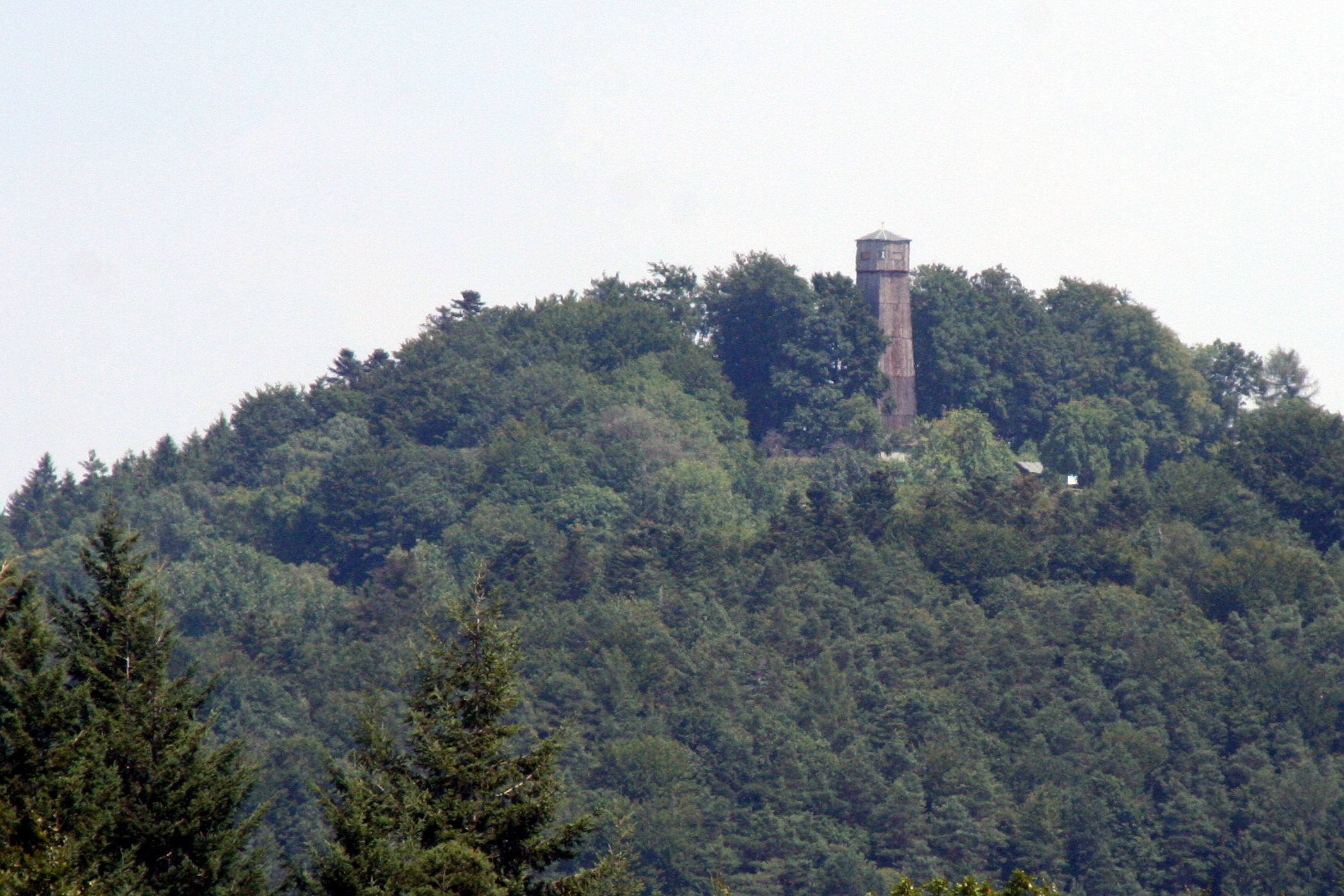
- Steinknickle with Steinknickleturm from the southwest.

Highest point
- Elevation: 525 m (1,722 ft)

Geography
- Location: Baden-Württemberg, Germany

Steinknickle is a mountain of Baden-Württemberg, Germany.
