= Swabian Keuper-Lias Plains =

Natural region in Germany

The Swabian Keuper-Lias Plains (German: Schwäbisches Keuper-Lias-Land) is a major natural region in southwest Germany and includes the southwesternmost part of the Keuper Uplands, which is bordered immediately to the north by the Swabian Jura.

== Natural regions ==
The Swabian Keuper lands are divided into three natural regional groups and their 3-figure major units which are given 3-figure numbers:

- 10 (=D58) Swabian Keuper-Lias Plains
  - 100 Foreland of the western Swabian Jura (Vorland der mittleren Schwäbischen Alb)
  - 101 Foreland of the central Swabian Jura (Vorland der mittleren Schwäbischen Alb)
  - 102 Foreland of the eastern Swabian Jura (Vorland der östlichen Schwäbischen Alb)
  - 103 Nördlinger Ries
  - 104 Schönbuch and Glemswald
    - Rammert
    - Schönbuch
    - Glemswald
  - 105 Stuttgart Bay
  - 106 Filder
  - 107 Schurwald and Welzheim Forest
    - Schurwald
    - Lower Rems Valley
    - Welzheim Forest
  - 108 Swabian-Franconian Forest (Schwäbisch-Fränkischer Wald)
    - Heilbronn Hills
    - Löwenstein Hills
    - Mainhardt Forest
    - Waldenburg Hills
    - Murrhardt Forest
    - Limpurg Hills
    - Ellwangen Hills
    - Virngrund

== Sources ==
- BfN landscape fact file for Baden-Württemberg and Bavaria - all landscapes with a five-digit number beginning with "10" belong to the Swabian Keuper-Lias Plains; the first three digits stand for the major unit.
