= Am Rank (Röhmsee) =

Coordinates: 48°39′59″N 9°21′23″E

Nature reserve Am Rank (Röhmsee)
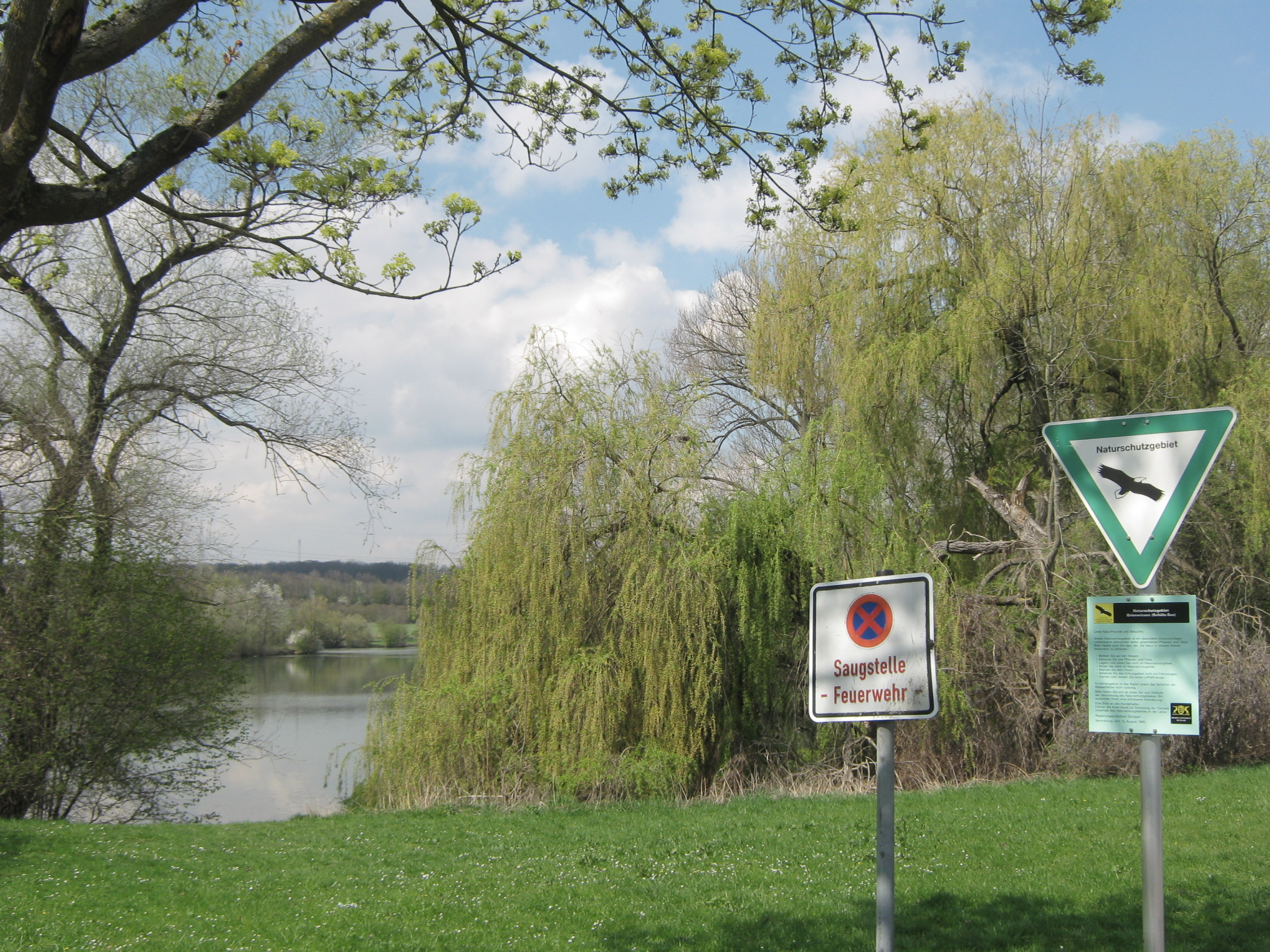
- Nature reserve Am Rank (Röhmsee)
- Interactive map of Nature reserve Am Rank (Röhmsee)
- Location: Deutschland, Baden-Württemberg, Esslingen (district), Unterensingen
- Area: 0.130 ha (0.32 acres)
- Average elevation: 270
- Established: 16. November 1981
- Operator: Regional Council Stuttgart

Am Rank (Röhmsee) is a nature conservation area, designated by decree of the Regional Council Stuttgart of 16 November 1981, in the Unterensingen municipality of District Esslingen in Baden-Württemberg, Germany. It includes and surrounds a quarry pond named Röhmsee, after a former owner.

Together with the Schülesee, the 13-hectare Röhmsee forms a protected area of about 25 hectares. The lakes are a supra-regionally important ecological compensation area with well-developed siltation zones. Lake Röhmsee is important as a resting place for migrating birds and as a refuge for endangered bird species. As the oldest quarry pond still existing in the Neckar river system, it has developed into an important breeding water for birds. Among others, the bittern, the marsh warbler, the coot and the moorhen breed here. The Unterensingen quarry ponds occupy an excellent position as a transit and resting area. In the meantime, 223 species have been recorded in this relatively small area.

The area belongs to the Naturraum Filder in the Swabian Keuper-Lias-Land.

== See also ==
- List of nature conservation areas in Baden-Württemberg
- List of nature reserves in the district of Esslingen
