= Keuper Uplands =

Part of the South German Scarplands

The Keuper Uplands (German: Keuperbergland or, more rarely Keuperwaldberge) are part of the South German Scarplands and cover an area of about 3,200 square kilometres.

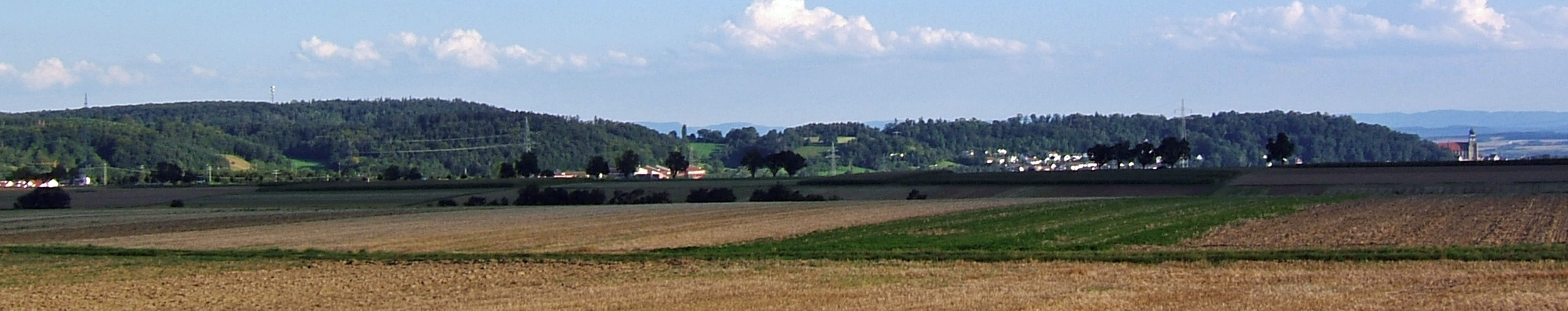
Keuper escarpment above the Heckengäu plains on the western edge of the Schönbuch

The following regions belong to the Keuper Uplands (from southwest to northeast): the Kleiner Heuberg, Rammert, Schönbuch, Glemswald, Stromberg and Heuchelberg, Schurwald and Welzheim Forest, Swabian-Franconian Forest, Franconian Heights, Steigerwald and Hassberge. The southwesternmost Keuper escarpment in the area of the Baar does not have its own name because of its small size.

== Natural region divisions ==
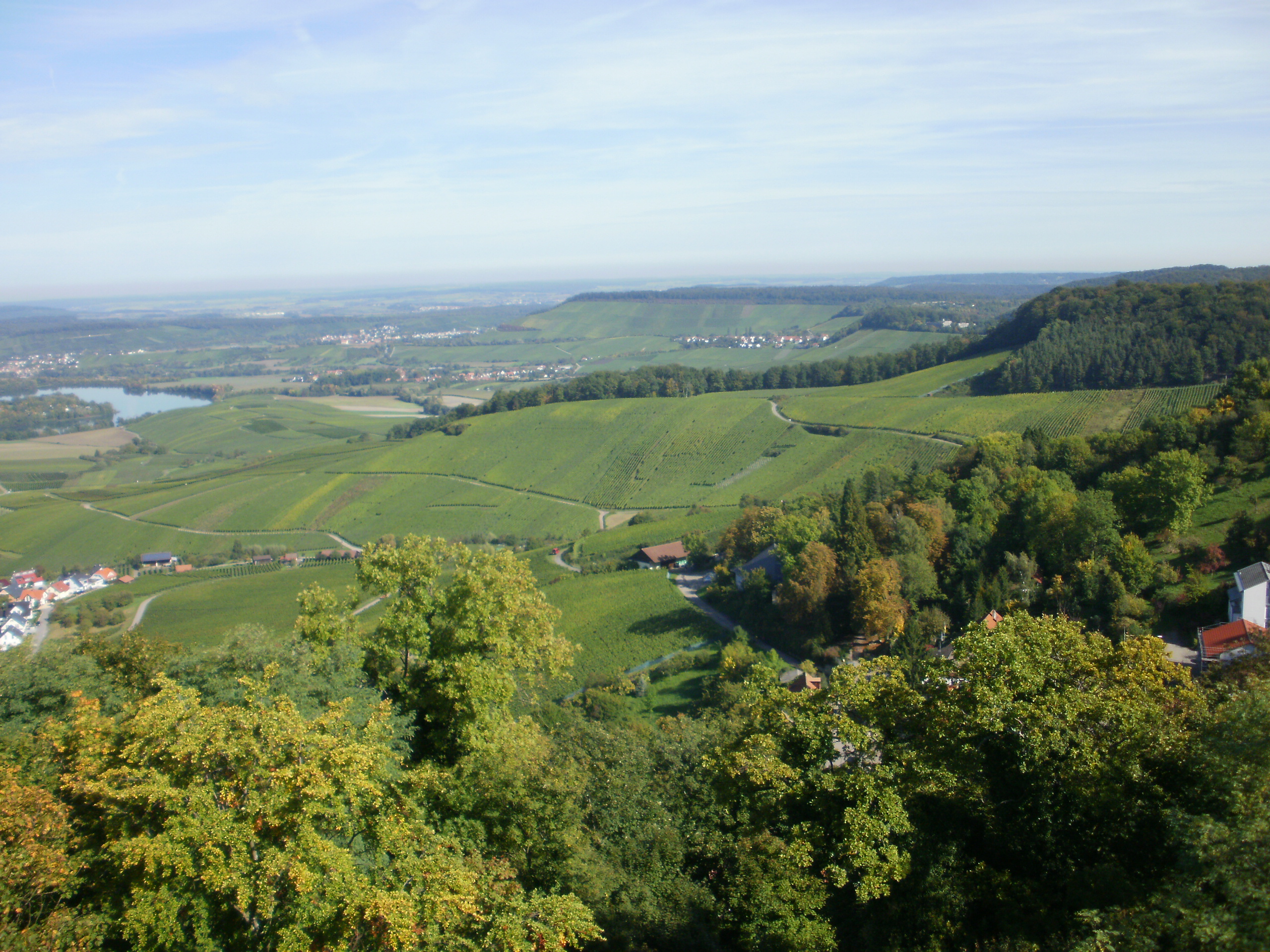
The Keuper escarpment in the northwest of the Swabian-Franconian Forest near Löwenstein. The scarp can easily be seen from the profile of the terrain of the Wolfertsberg which drops away to the west in the centre of the photograph. Uppermost (right) is the forested scarp sandstone, steeper descent into the highest vineyards in the upper, coloured marls, elongated plateau on gravel sandstone, again steeper descent (partly forested) into the lower coloured marls to the reedbed sandstone, which has been reshaped by vine cultivation in recent times. The valley bottom is formed from gipskeuper.

The Keuper Uplands are divided into three natural region major unit groups which, in turn, are subdivided into major units, shown underneath in each case with three-figure index numbers (units of which only small areas lie on keuper are in italics) and ridges that are orographically separated from one another (basins and ridges on the perimeters have been omitted):

- (part of the South German Scarplands)
  - (part of the 12 Neckar and Tauber Gäu Plateaux)
    - 124 Stromberg and Heuchelberg
      - 124.1 Stromberg
      - 124.2 Heuchelberg and Eppinger Hardt
  - zu 10 Swabian Keuper-Lias Plains
    - 104 Schönbuch and Glemswald
      - 104.11 Rammert
      - 104.12/15 Schönbuch (in its narrower sense)
      - 104.20 Inner Glemswald
    - 107 Schurwald and Welzheim Forest
      - 107.0 Schurwald
      - 107.2 Berglen
      - 107.3 Welzheim Forest
    - 108 Swabian-Franconian Forest
      - 108.00 Murrhardt Forest
      - 108.11 Sulm Plateaue
      - 108.13/14 Löwenstein Hills (in their narrower sense)
      - 108.30 Kirnberg Forest
      - 108.31 Sulzbach Forest
      - 108.4 Mainhardt Forest
      - 108.5 Waldenburg Hills
      - 108.60 Limpurg Hills
      - 108.70 Ellwangen Hills
  - (zu 11 Franconian Keuper-Lias Land)
    - 114 Franconian Heights
    - 115 Steigerwald
    - 116 Haßberge
    - (part of the 117 Itz-Baunach Hills)
      - 117.40 Zeilberge

Apart from the Stromber and Heuchelberg, which lie north of Schönbuch and Glemswald and outside the Keuper-Lias landscapes in the muschelkalk dominated Gäue, the landscapes in the above list along the Albtrauf, from which they are separated by the lias dominated forelands, are oriented in a northeasterly direction.

== Landscape ==
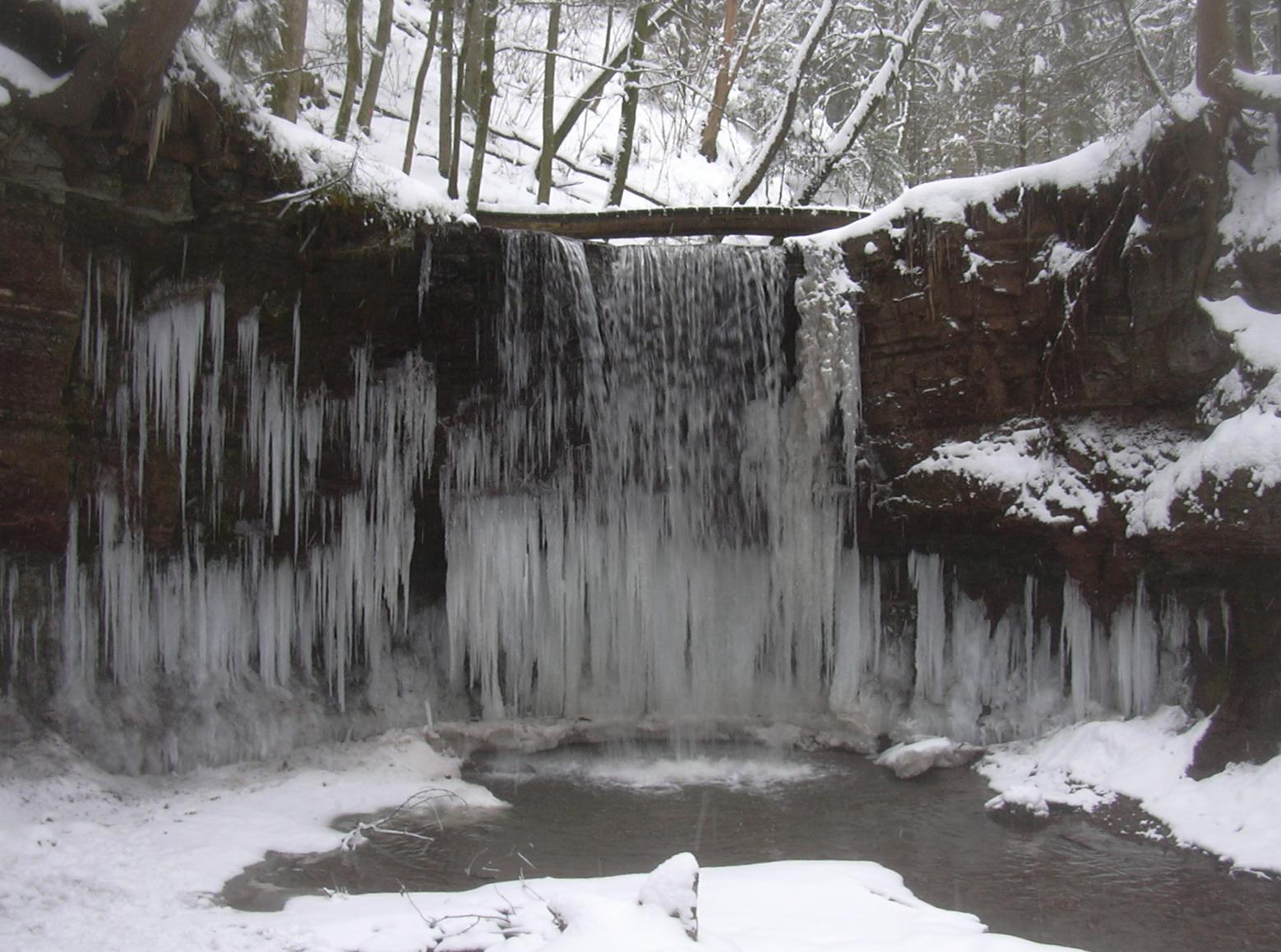
Waterfall in the stuben sandstone in the gully of the Hörschbach stream near Murrhardt

The landscape is characterised by the rock - keuper that gives it its name and is the uppermost and youngest lithostratigraphic group of the Germanic Trias. It exhibits a variety of depositions of sand beds and marine sediments.

The Keuper Uplands are largely forested because the soils that form on the keuper are not very fertile. Island clearings are found especially on the fertile loess or lias soils.

The very steep-sided V-shaped valleys that are typical of the Keuper Uplands are known here as klingen. Such klingen occur in the petrographically harder sandstone beds of the keuper, for example in the Stubensandstein. These rocks are able to resist significantly the erosion forces (especially side erosion) of water. In less erosion-resistant rocks of the keuper like the clays or marls, the valleys are more deeply carved out so that many wider-profiled valley are formed.
