= Ellwangen Hills =

Hill range in Germany

Ellwanger Berge
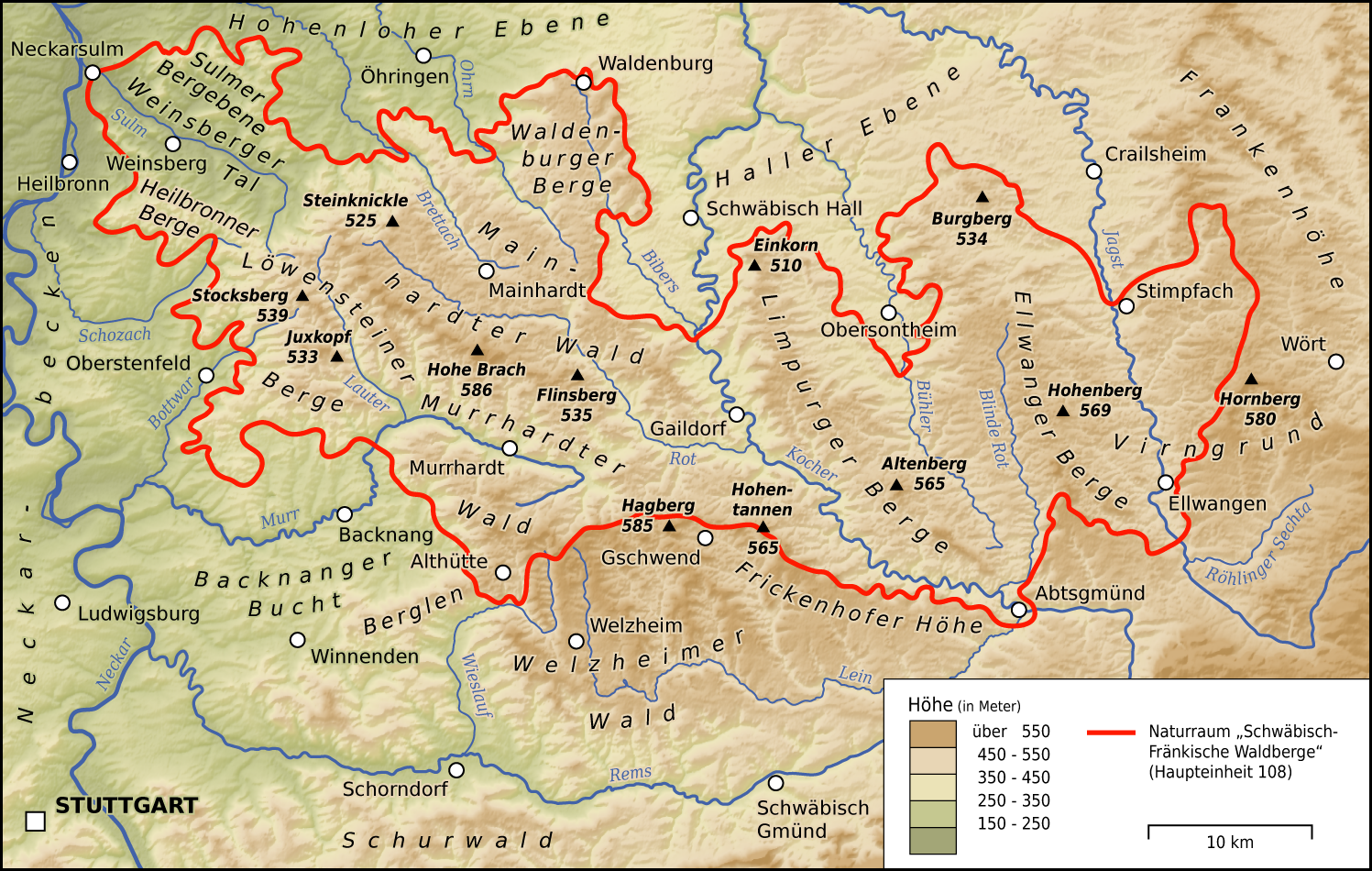
- The Ellwangen Hills in the east of the Swabian-Franconian Forest

Highest point
- Peak: Schönberg
- Elevation: 569.2 m above NHN

Geography
- State(s): Counties of Schwäbisch Hall, Ostalbkreis in Baden-Württemberg, Germany
- Range coordinates: 48°58′03″N 10°01′58″E

Geology
- Rock type: Keuper

The Ellwangen Hills (German: Ellwanger Berge) are a hill ridge, up to 569.2 m above sea level (NHN), in the counties of Schwäbisch Hall and Ostalbkreis in the German state of Baden-Württemberg.

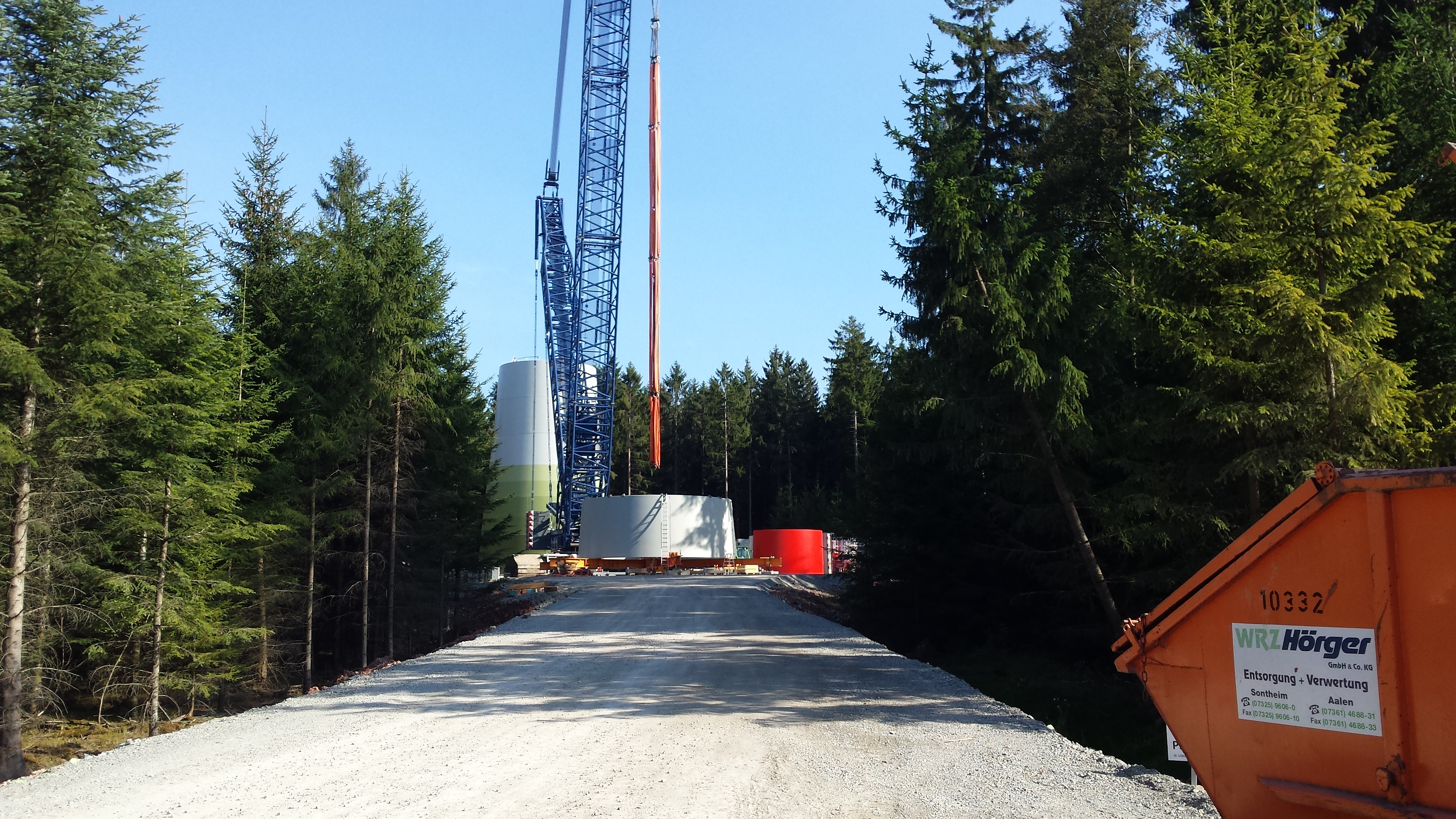
Construction of a wind turbine in the Ellwanger Berge wind farm (2016)

The name of the range comes from the town of Ellwangen. The hills are known nationally especially because of the eponymous motorway services on the A 7.

== Geography ==
=== Location ===
The Ellwangen Hills belong to the Keuper Uplands and lie about 65 kilometres northeast of the city of Stuttgart and around 67 kilometres (both as the crow flies) east-southeast of the city of Heilbronn between the Haller Plain to the north, the Franconian Heights and the Virngrund to the east, the Härtsfeld to the south, the Frickenhofer Höhe to the southwest and the Limpurg Hills to the west. They are situated south of Frankenhardt, west of Rosenberg and Ellwangen, northwest of Hüttlingen, east of Adelmannsfelden, Bühlerzell and Bühlertann and southeast of Obersontheim and Vellberg.

=== Hills ===
The highest point of the Ellwangen Hills is the summit of the Schönberg at 569.2 m, which is 1.7 kilometres north-northeast of Neuler-Gaishardt. The hill has a rather uneven plateau to the south of the summit which is about 100 metres wide and around 700 metres long, over 560 m metres high. The Schönberg is entirely wooded which means there are no views from the top.

The next highest point is the Hohenberg, 568.9 m, at the eastern foot of which is the village of Rosenberg-Hohenberg. The hilltop forms a steep, kuppe that rises roughly 50 metres above the surrounding area and has a plateau measuring about 300 metres from west to east and is 100 metres wide. Apart from its western hillside, the whole kuppe is treeless and offers views over much of the Ellwangen Hills, to the south as far as the Albtrauf. Several footpaths meet on the kuppe: from Burgberg to the north, Bühlerzell to the west, Orrotsee to the east and from Ellwangen to the southeast. There s a pilgrimage church, St. James, on the top and there is a Way of the Cross on the path climbing up from the village. For many years a branch of the Way of St. James also ran here, coming from Rothenburg ob der Tauber over the castle hill to the church and then on to Abtsgmünd-Wöllstein heading for Switzerland.
