= Altenberg (Limpurg Hills) =

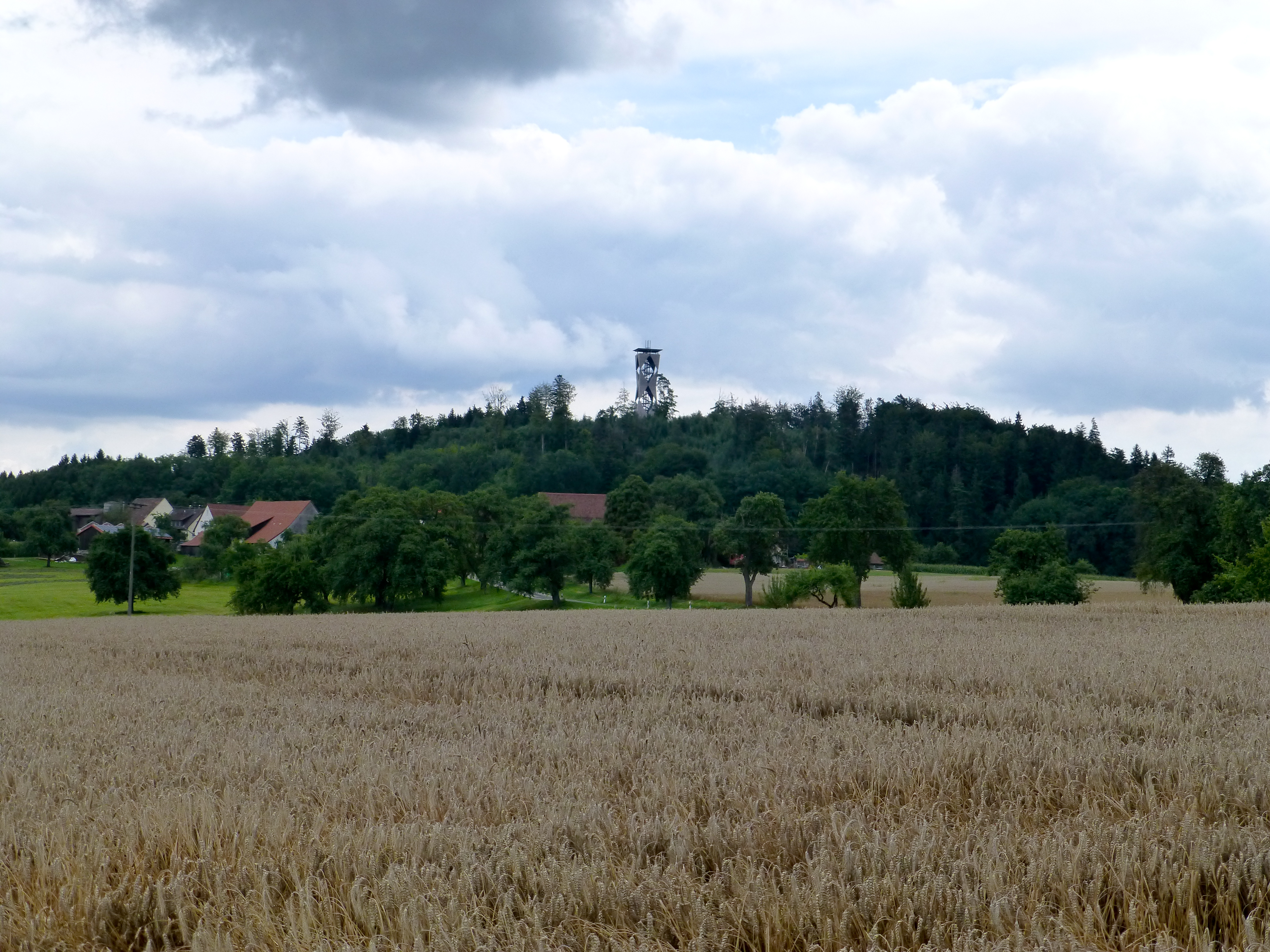
- Altenberg seen from the west

Highest point
- Elevation: 564.7 m (1,853 ft)
- Coordinates: 48°57′46″N 09°55′07″E

Geography
- Location within Baden-Württemberg
- Location: Baden-Württemberg, Germany
- Parent range: Limpurg Hills

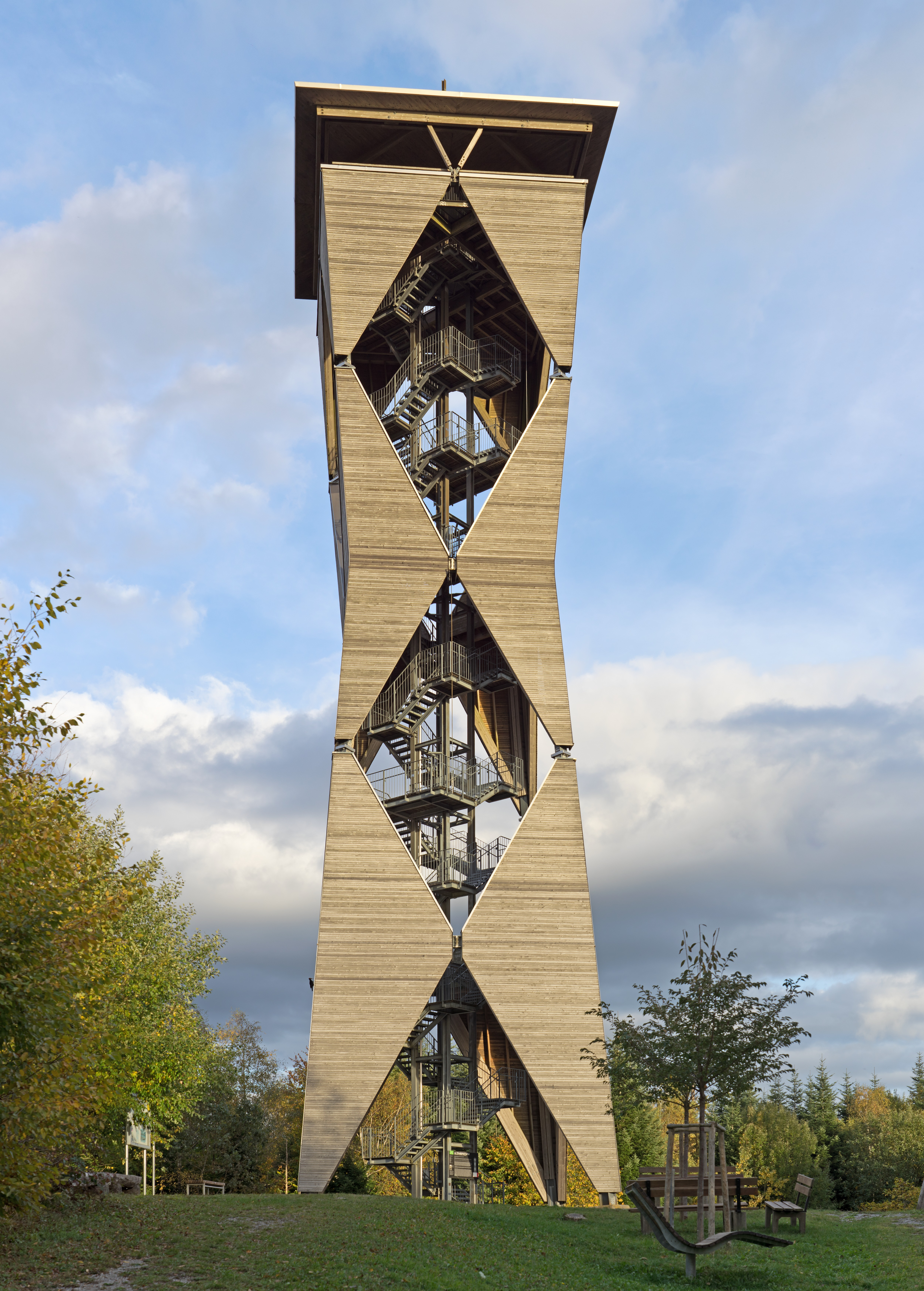
The Altenberg Tower from the west

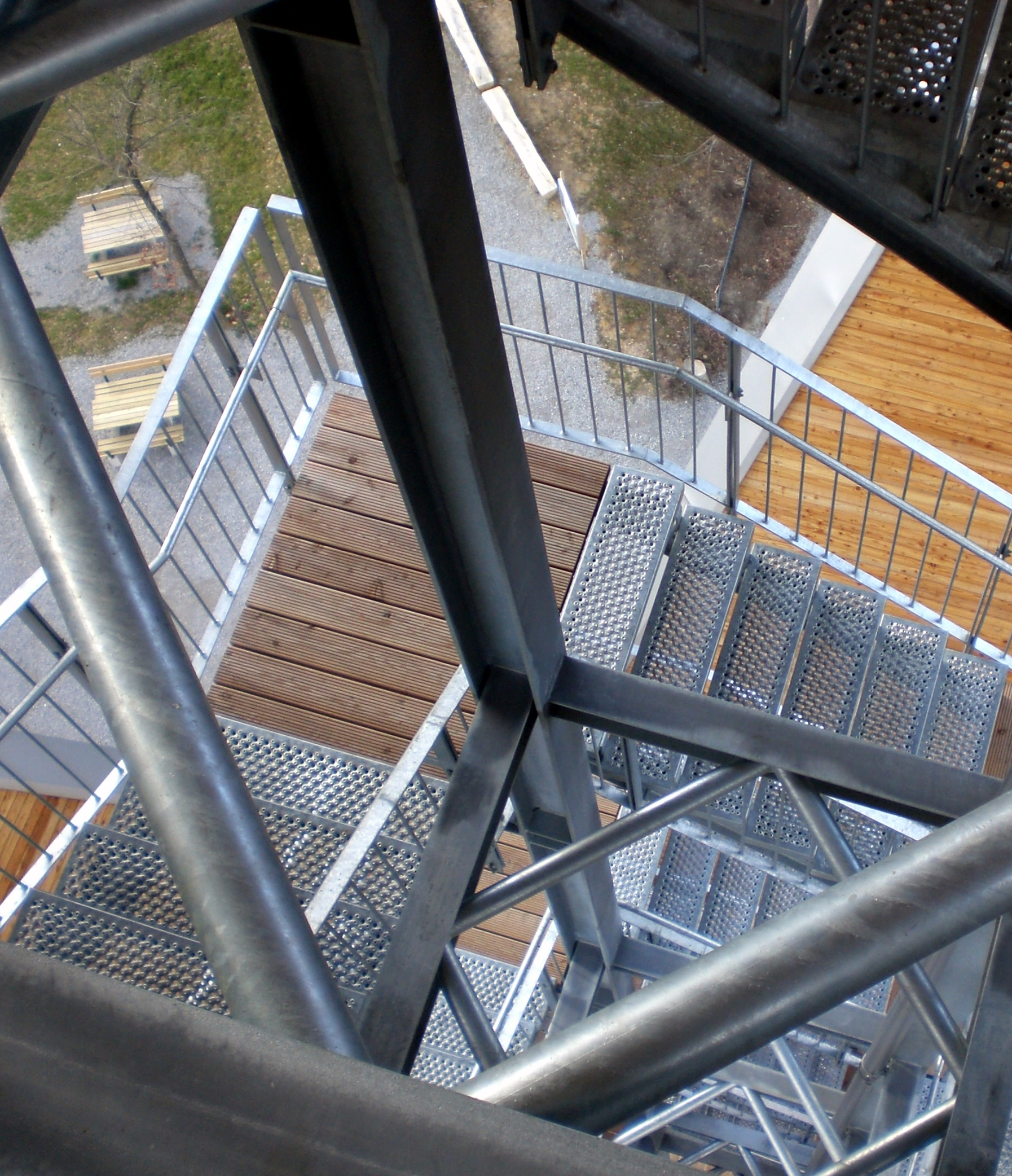
View of the staircase

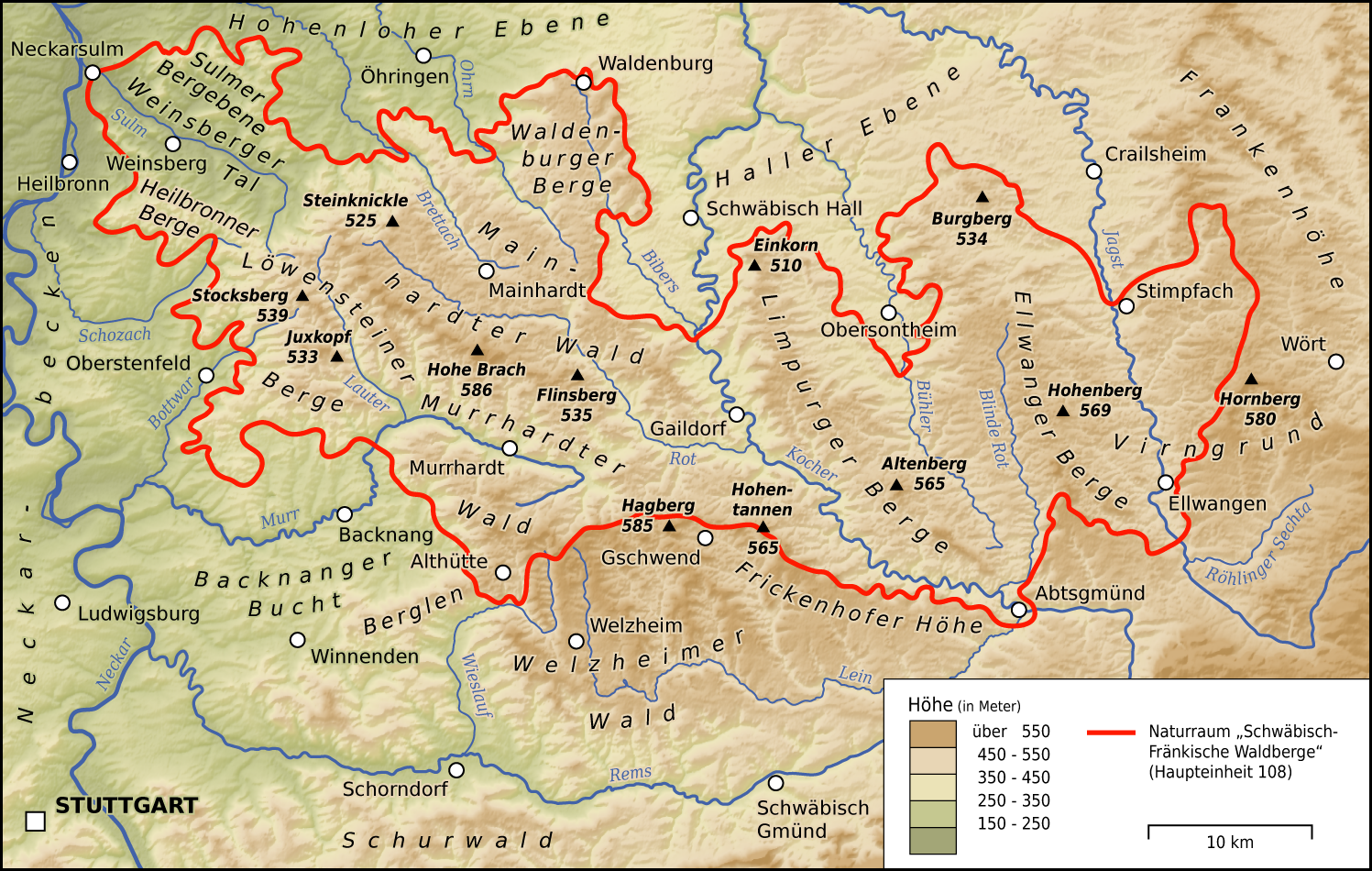
The Altenberg in the Limpurg Hills in the central eastern part of the Swabian-Franconian Forest

The Altenberg (German pronunciation: [ˈaltn̩ˌbɛʁk]) is the highest summit in the Limpurg Hills in southwest Germany, reaching a height of 564.7 m above sea level (NHN) and rising some 60 metres above the surrounding area. It lies east of Hohenberg, a village in the municipality of Sulzbach-Laufen, within the county of Schwäbisch Hall in the state of Baden-Württemberg.

== Altenberg Tower ==
At the summit is the Altenberg Tower, a 38.3-metre-high observation tower. The tower was opened on 7 October 2007 and measures 36 metres from the ground to the observation platform. As a result, the fully covered viewing point is at a height of about 600 m.

== Access ==
- From the newly built visitor car park east of Hohenberg, a graveled path runs for a good 300 metres directly to the summit.
- A much longer and higher, but less steep path runs from the farm of Altenberg about 500 metres south of Hohenberg.
- In addition, various paths run from the east from the road between Hohenberg and Wegstetten as from the south from the Abtsklinge.
