= Rammert =

Hill range in Germany

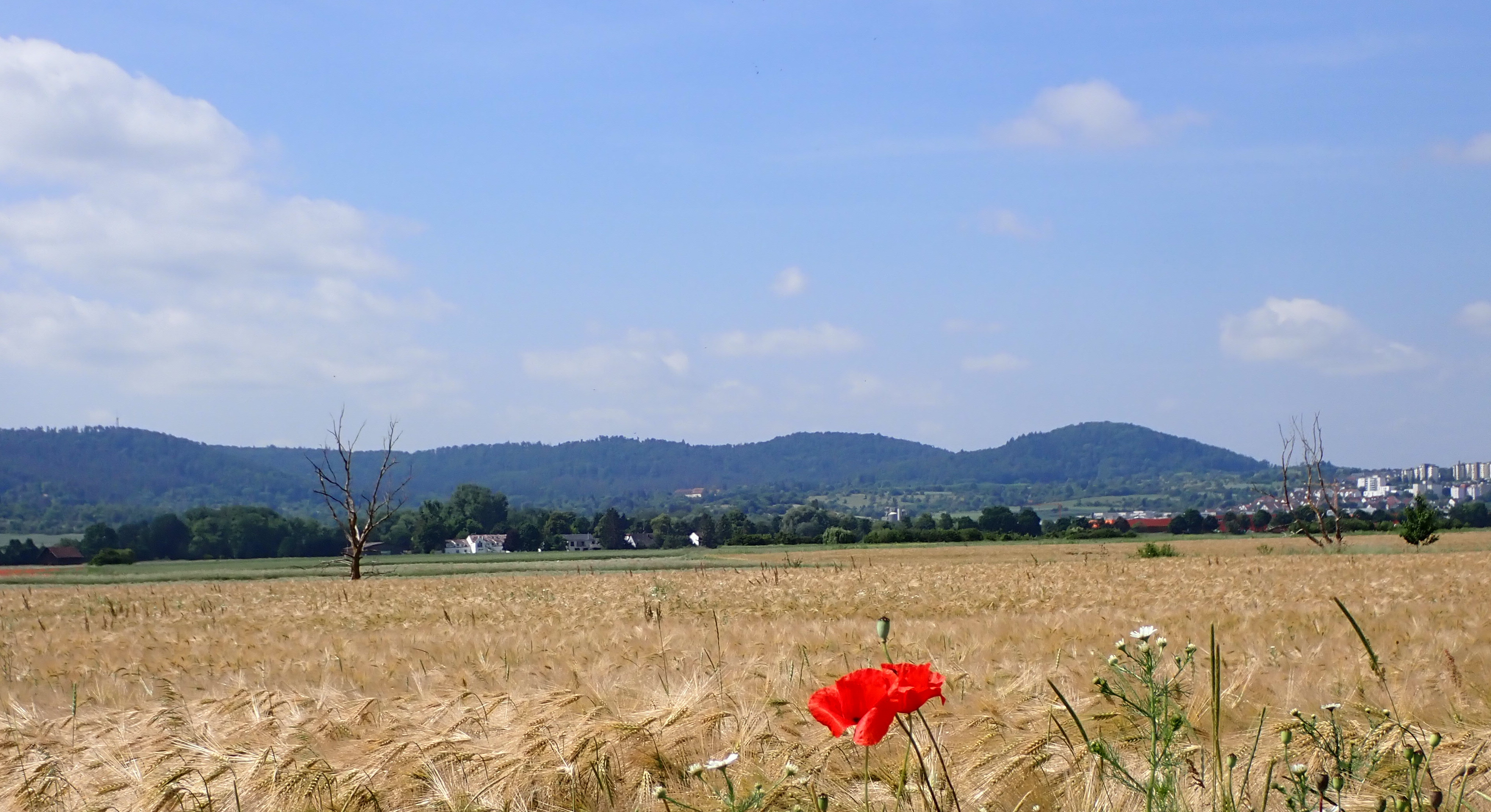
- Rammert from south, Rottenburg am Neckar on the right

Highest point
- Peak: Hohwacht
- Elevation: 590 m above NHN

Dimensions
- Length: 16 km (9.9 mi)

Geography
- Location within Baden-Württemberg
- State(s): Counties of Tübingen and Zollernalbkreis, Baden-Württemberg
- Range coordinates: 48°27′28″N 9°00′18″E
- Parent range: Schönbuch and Glamswald, Swabian Keuper-Lias Plains

Geology
- Rock type: Keuper

The Rammert is a forested hill range, up to 590 m above sea level (NN), in the Keuper Uplands of central Baden-Württemberg, which belongs to the natural region major unit of Schönbuch and Glemswald in the Swabian Keuper-Lias Land. It continues the Schönbuch to the southwest and is separated from it by the Tübingen Bay (Tübinger Stufenrandbucht) at the Neckar near Tübingen. The majority of the ridge lies in the county of Tübingen, with small elements in the county of Zollernalbkreis.

== Geography ==
The Rammert extends for 18 kilometres from Rangendingen in the southwest to Tübingen in the northeast and is 7 kilometres across at its widest point between Rottenburg am Neckar and Ofterdingen. In the north it is bounded by the Neckar valley, in the southeast by the Steinlach valley and in the southwest by the water gap of the Starzel. In the northeast it peters out to a point, which gives it a roughly triangular shape.

Its highest point is the Hohwacht at 590 m above NN which rises between Rangendingen and Bodelshausen, followed by Langen First near Hirrlingen at 558 m and the 556 m-high Lausbühl not far from the Schadenweiler Hof near Rottenburg.

The valleys of the Vorbach, Katzenbach and Krebsbach streams, which head northwards or northeastwards, divide the Rammert sharply. As part of the South German Scarplands the Rammert tilts slightly towards the southeast and forms a striking ledge, about 100 to 150 metres high on the rim of the Neckar valley.

The Weilerburg (555 m) which lies in front of the Rammert to the north is an outlier of it. The southeastern slopes on the opposite side are gentler. There the Rammert transitions gradually into the rocks of the Black and Brown Jurassic rocks of the Jura Foreland.

The Rammert predominantly forested because of its sandy and clayey soils that are unfavourable for farming. Its forests are intensively used for forestry. The main tree species are beech, spruce, scots pine, and oak. Extensive wetlands only cover parts of the valleys.
