= Einkorn (hill) =

Hill in Baden-Württemberg, Germany

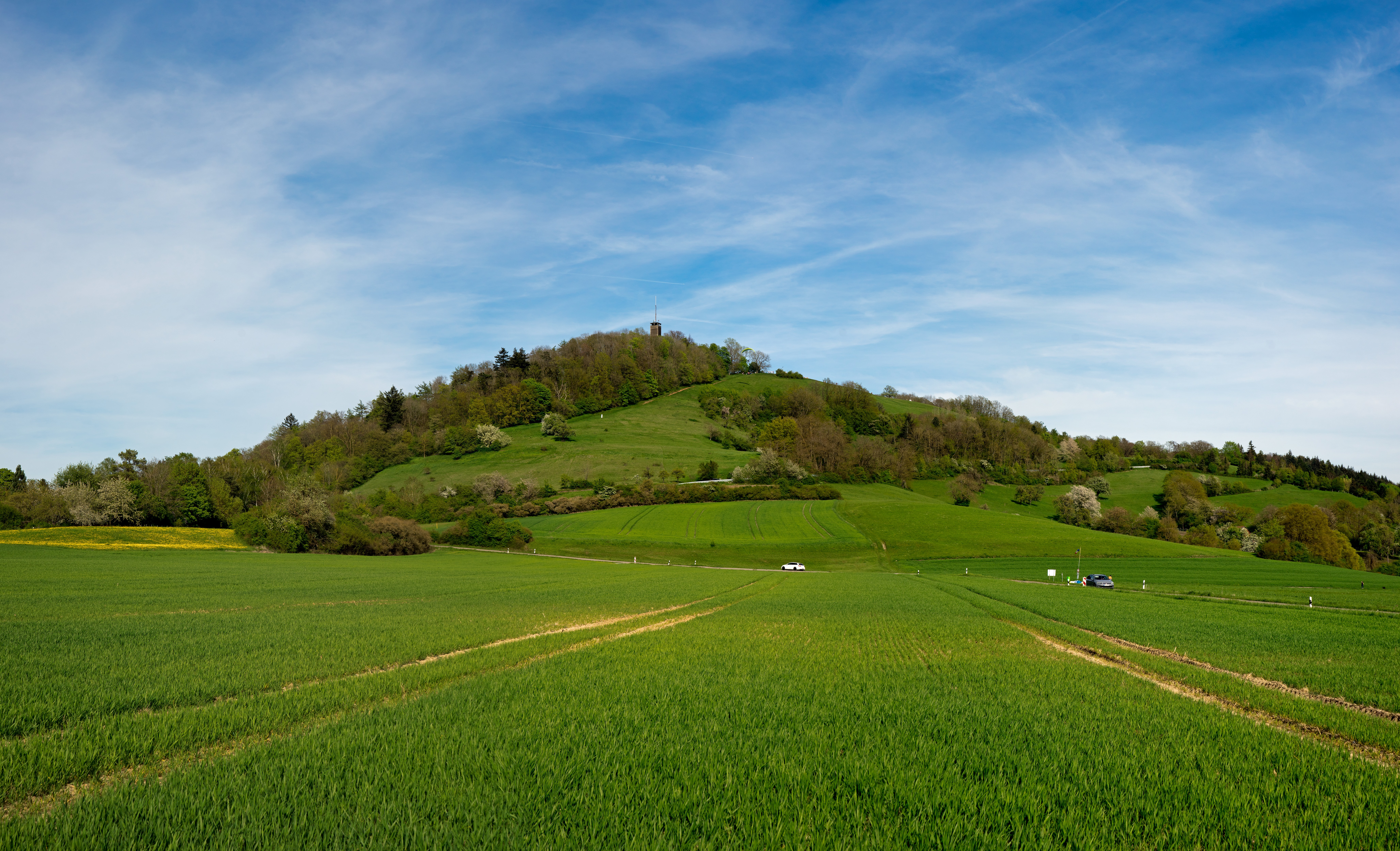
- The Einkorn (2024), seen from the west.

Highest point
- Elevation: 510 m (1,670 ft)
- Coordinates: 49°05′N 09°47′E

Geography
- Location within Baden-Württemberg
- Location: Baden-Württemberg, Germany
- Parent range: Limpurg Hills

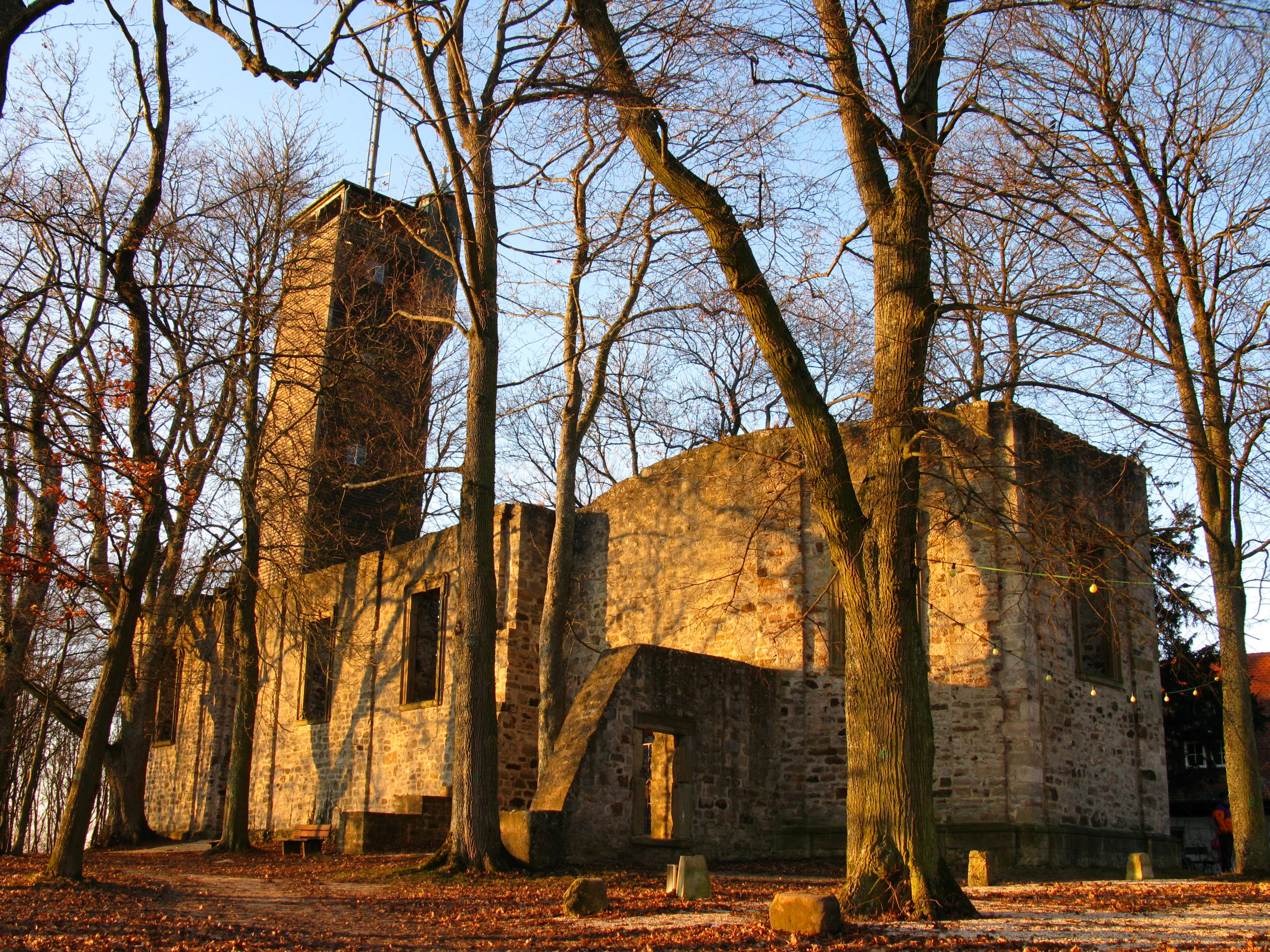
The ruins of the pilgrimage church and the observation tower, seen from the southeast.

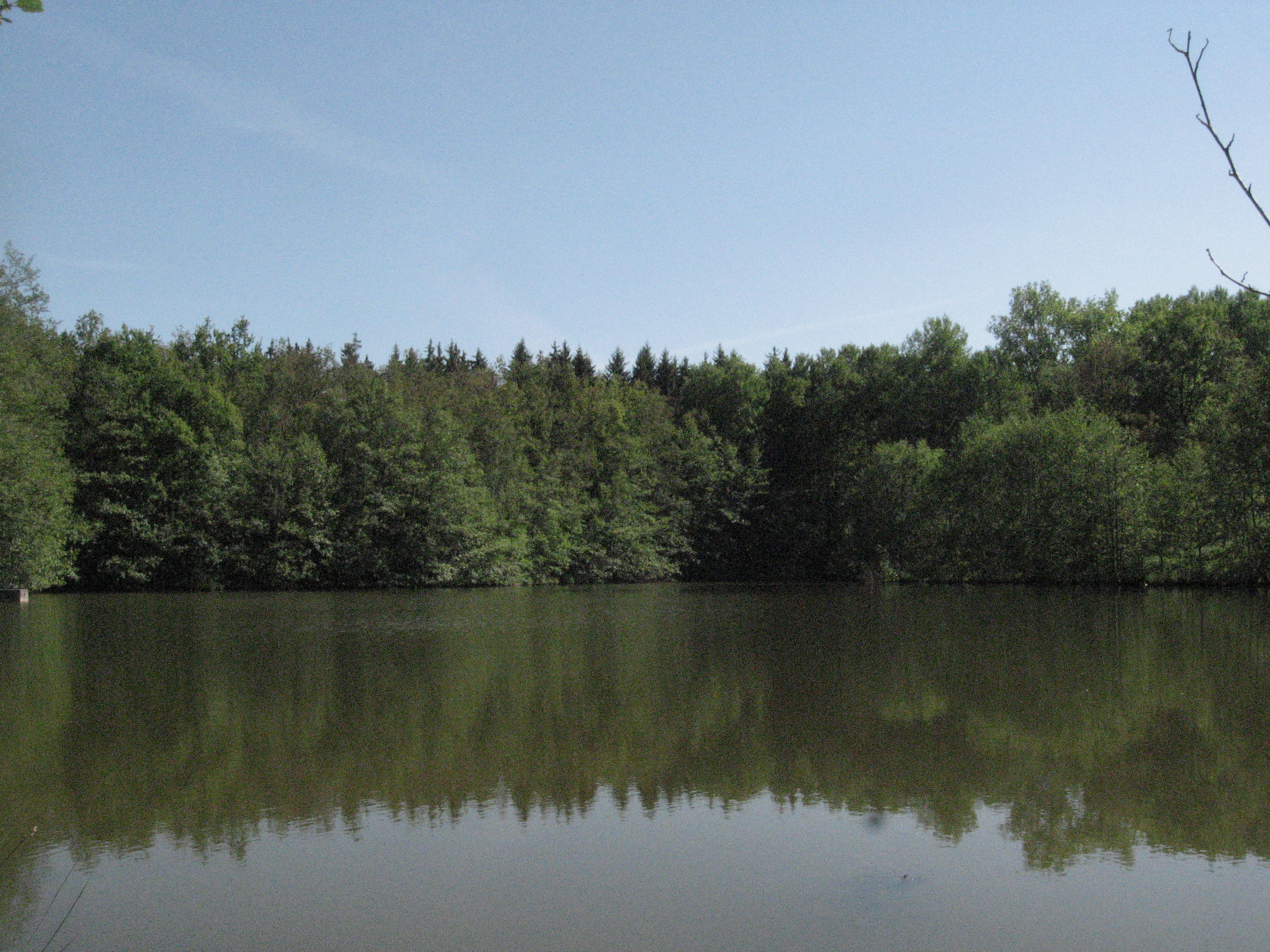
The Bombensee lake in the Einkornwald woods, seen from its northern shore.

The Einkorn is a 510-metre high hill spur in the northern Limpurg Hills near Hessental in the borough of Schwäbisch Hall. It has the ruins of a baroque pilgrimage church that was dedicated to the Fourteen Holy Helpers. The hill is located in the German state of Baden-Württemberg.
