= Limpurg Hills =

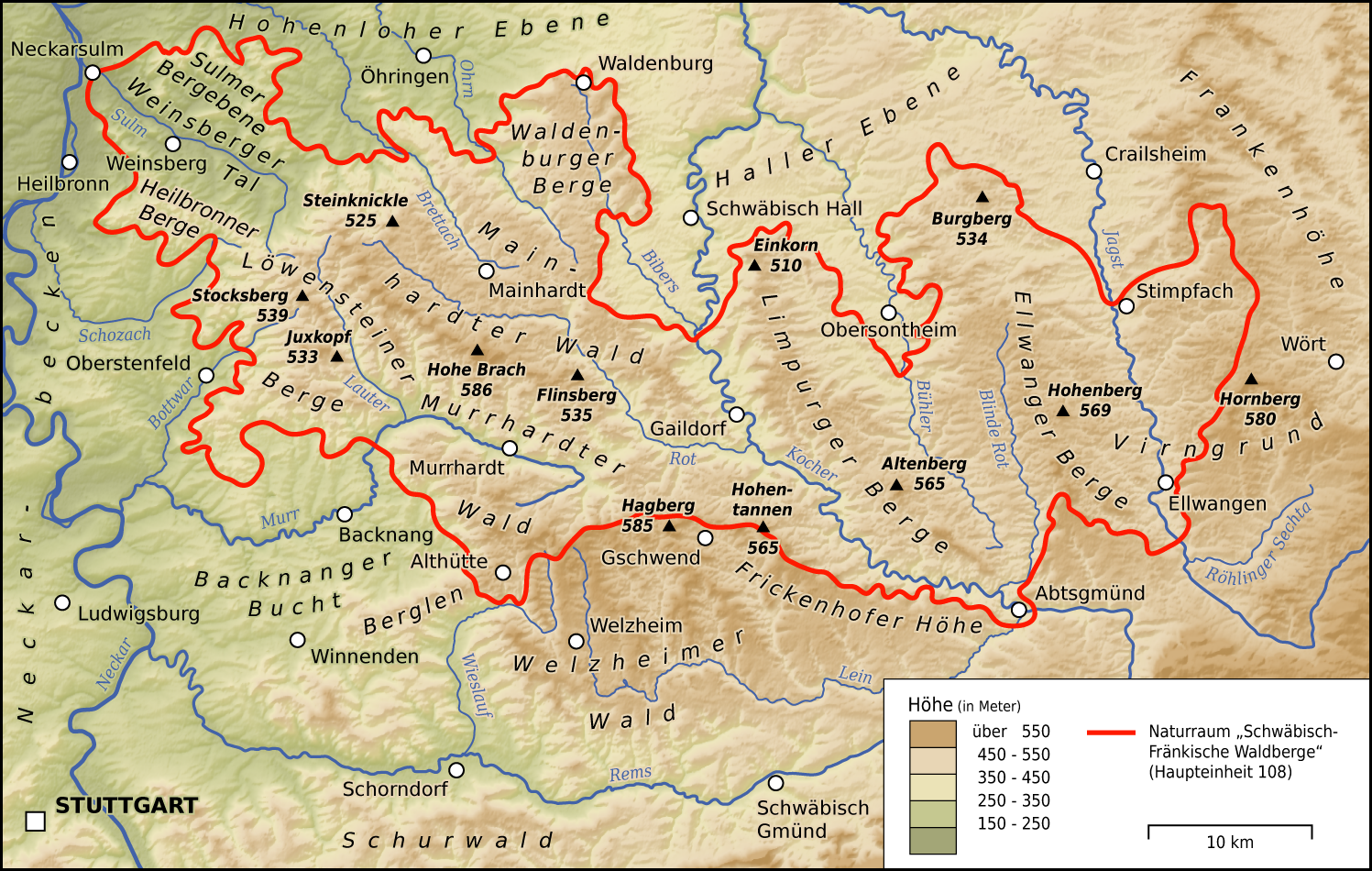
- The Limpurg Hills in the central eastern part of the Swabian-Franconian Forest

Highest point
- Peak: Altenberg
- Elevation: 564.7 m above NHN

Geography
- Location: Counties of Schwäbisch Hall and Ostalbkreis, Baden-Württemberg, Germany
- Range coordinates: 48°57′48″N 9°54′07″E

The Limpurg Hills (German: Limpurger Berge) are a hill range, up to 564.7 m above sea level (NHN), in the Swabian-Franconian Forest in the counties of Schwäbisch Hall and Ostalbkreis in the German state of Baden-Württemberg. The majority of the region belonged formerly to Limpurg Land owned by the family of Schenken von Limpurg, whose name was derived from their family home, Limpurg Castle near Schwäbisch Hall.

== Geography ==
=== Location ===
The Limpurg Hills lie about 55 kilometres northeast of Stuttgart and around 60 kilometres (both as the crow flies) east-southeast of Heilbronn, between the Haller Ebene to the north, the Ellwangen Hills to the east and southeast, the Frickenhofer Höhe to the south, the Mainhardt Forest to the west and the Waldenburg Hills to the northwest. They lie southeast of Schwäbisch Hall, west of Sulzdorf, Obersontheim, Bühlertann, Bühlerzell and Adelmannsfelden and extend as far as the Blinde Rot river, northwest of Abtsgmünd. Untergröningen, Sulzbach-Laufen, Gaildorf, Westheim and Michelbach an der Bilz lie immediately west of the forested upland region.

Its striking geomorphological boundaries are the escarpment in the north that drops down to the Haller Ebene, the Buhler valley to the east and the great bend of the Kocher valley gorge to the south and west. To the southeast the Limpurg Hills run with the very narrow and long Unterjura Plateau of the Büchelberg Ridge down to the mouth of the Blinde Rot.

=== Hills ===
The highest point of the Limpurg Hills and of the county of Schwäbisch Hall is the Altenberg (564.7 m), east of Sulzbach am Kocher, on which there is an observation tower, the Altenberg Tower. Better known, however, is the Einkorn (510 m), south of Hessental, which rises above the Hohenloher-Haller Plain, and forms a prominent, westward-running spur of the northern edge of the forest region.

Several summits in the following list of high points in the Limpurg Hills (organized by height in metres above sea level (NHN)), only rise slightly above the very flat plateau of the larger western chain of the hills and, when seen from outside the range, may scarcely be viewed as individual peaks. The smaller and lower, but more deeply incised eastern chain, by comparison, has many more named individual summits.

- Altenberg (564.7 m), ca. 500 m east-southeast of Sulzbach am Kocher-Hohenberg, with the Altenberg Tower, prominent individual peak in the western hill chain
- Höfenberg (555.3 m), ca. 550 m southeast of Abtsgmünd-Höfenhölzle, highest part of the Büchelberg Ridge on its northwestern slopes
- Herschel (522.1 m), ca. 1,5 km west of the Gaildorf hamlet of Winzenweiler
- Streitberg (514.4 m), ca. 2,5 km east-northeast of Gaildorf-Eutendorf
- Bauernschnäue (512.3 m), ca. 2 km southeast of Schwäbisch Hall-Hessental, starting point of the insignificant eastern chain
- Krämersreute (511.3 m), ca. 1 km west-southwest of the Gaildorfer hamlet of Eisbach
- Einkorn (510 m), ca. 1 km southeast of Hessental railway station, northwest spur
- Rauher Berg (508.0 m), ca. 2,5 km west-southwest of Schwäbisch Hall-Sulzdorf, eastern chain
- Hehlberg (504.0 m), ca. 2 km south-southwest of Sulzdorf, eastern chain
- Neuberg (499.1 m), ca. 2,5 km southwest of Sulzdorf, eastern chain
- Berg (472.9 m), ca. 1 km northeast of Obersontheim-Herlebach, eastern chain
- Adelberg (466.9 m), ca. 2 km southeast of Rosengarten-Westheim; with the barely discernible Buchhorn (463.4 m) it is a small independent massif in front of the western chain
- Eichelberg (463.2 m), immediately northwest of Sulzbach am Kocher, western chain, mouth spur of the Eisbach
- Häuserberg (449.2 m), about 1,5 km south-southwest of Obersontheim-Hausen, eastern chain
- Leippersberg (447.6 m), about 1,5 km west-northwest of Bühlertann-Kottspiel, mouth spur of the Fischach and southern end of the eastern chain
