= Adelmannsfelden =

- Municipality
- Flag Coat of arms

- Location of Adelmannsfelden within Ostalbkreis district
- Interactive map of Adelmannsfelden
- Location within Germany Location within Baden-Württemberg
- Coordinates: 48°57′09″N 10°00′19″E
- Country: Germany
- State: Baden-Württemberg
- Admin. region: Stuttgart
- District: Ostalbkreis
- Subdivisions: 4 Ortsteile

Government
  - Mayor (2023–31): Manuel Hoke

Area
  - Total: 22.9 km^{2} (8.8 sq mi)
- Elevation: 471 m (1,545 ft)

Population (2025-12-31)
  - Total: 1,721
  - Density: 75.2/km^{2} (195/sq mi)
- Time zone: UTC+01:00 (CET)
  - Summer (DST): UTC+02:00 (CEST)
- Postal codes: 73486
- Dialling codes: 07963
- Vehicle registration: AA
- Website: www.adelmannsfelden.de

Adelmannsfelden (German pronunciation: [aːdl̩mansˈfɛldn̩]) is a municipality in the German state of Baden-Württemberg, in Ostalbkreis district.

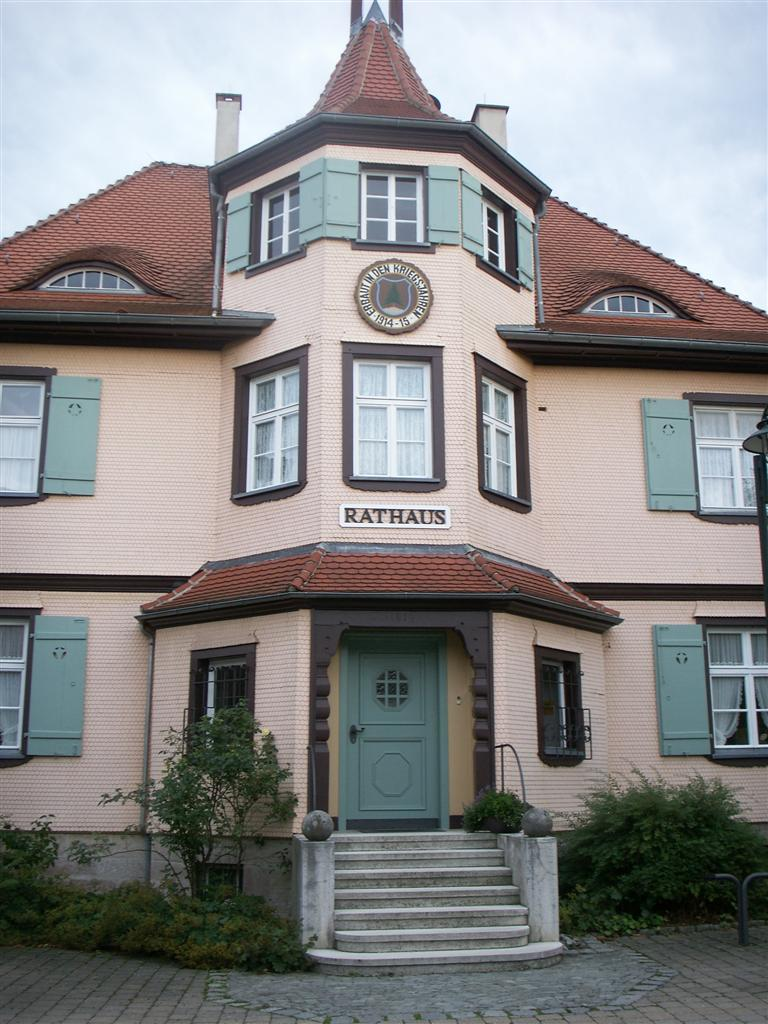
Adelmannsfelden Town hall

== Geography ==
Adelmannsfelden is located in the Ellwangen Hills landscape in the Natural region Swabian-Franconian Forest.

=== Municipality division ===
The municipality of Adelmannsfelden includes 18 villages, hamlets, yards and houses. There are four villages: Adelmannsfelden, Bühler, Haid and Stöcken. The three Hamlets are called Mittelwald, Ottenhof and Vorderwald. The yards include Dollishäusle, Eichhorn, Kuderberg, Mäder, Metzelgehren, Ölmühle, Papiermühle, Patrizenhaus and Wendenhof. The houses include Sägmühle and Schleifhäusle. Furthermore, the municipality includes the abandoned yards Altenwinden, Kunhof, Härzern, Limperg, Scheytenmühle, Breitengehren, Finkenhaus, Vorhardsweiler, Herzert, Herrenmühle and Rot diu Mul.

=== Area division ===
According to data of the Statistical Office of Baden-Württemberg, as of 2021.

=== Neighboring municipalities ===
The municipality borders Rosenberg in the Northeast, Neuler in the East, Abstgmünd in the South, Sulzbach-Laufen in the West and Bühlerzell in the North.

== History ==
The municipality was first mentioned in the Ellwanger annals around 1118. At this time, a castle was built. The castle stood at the place where the Adelmannfelden Castle is located today. Descendants of the Adelmann von Adelmannsfelden family live in Adelmannsfelden Castle until today. The municipality was under changing clerical and secular rule until it became part of the Kingdom of Württemberg in 1806. Specifically, it was under the Oberamt of Aalen, which became the Landkreis Aalen (District of Aalen) during the district reforms in the NS era. Between 1945 and 1952, Adelmannsfelden belonged to the federal state of Württemberg-Baden, which was established in the US occupation zone. In 1952, it became part of the newly established federal state of Baden-Württemberg. The Landkreis Aalen was dissolved during the district reforms in 1973 and Adelmannsfelden now belongs to the district Ostalbkreis.

== Notable people ==
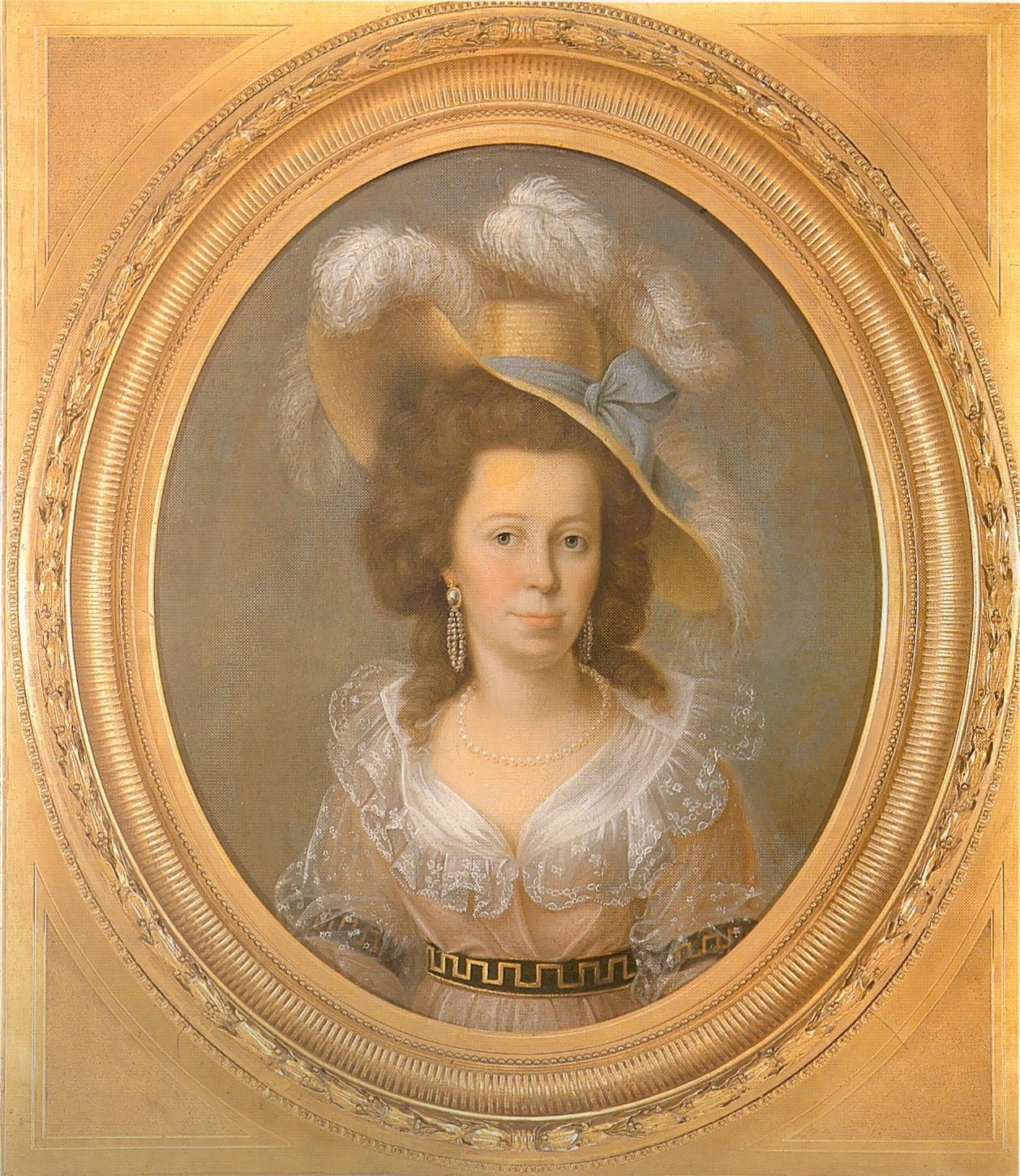
Franziska von Hohenheim around 1790

- Franziska von Hohenheim (1748–1811), second wife of Charles Eugene, Duke of Württemberg

== Religion ==
In 1561, the Reformation reached Adelmannsfelden. Since then, the village has been Protestant dominated. The Protestant community of Adelmannsfelden is part of the Kirchenbezirk Aalen. After World War II, many Catholic refugees and displaced people came to Adelmannsfelden. The Catholic inhabitants of the municipality have access to a Catholic church in Ottenhofen as well as chapels in Bühler and Stöcken which are being spiritually cared for from Abtsgmünd.
