= Virngrund =

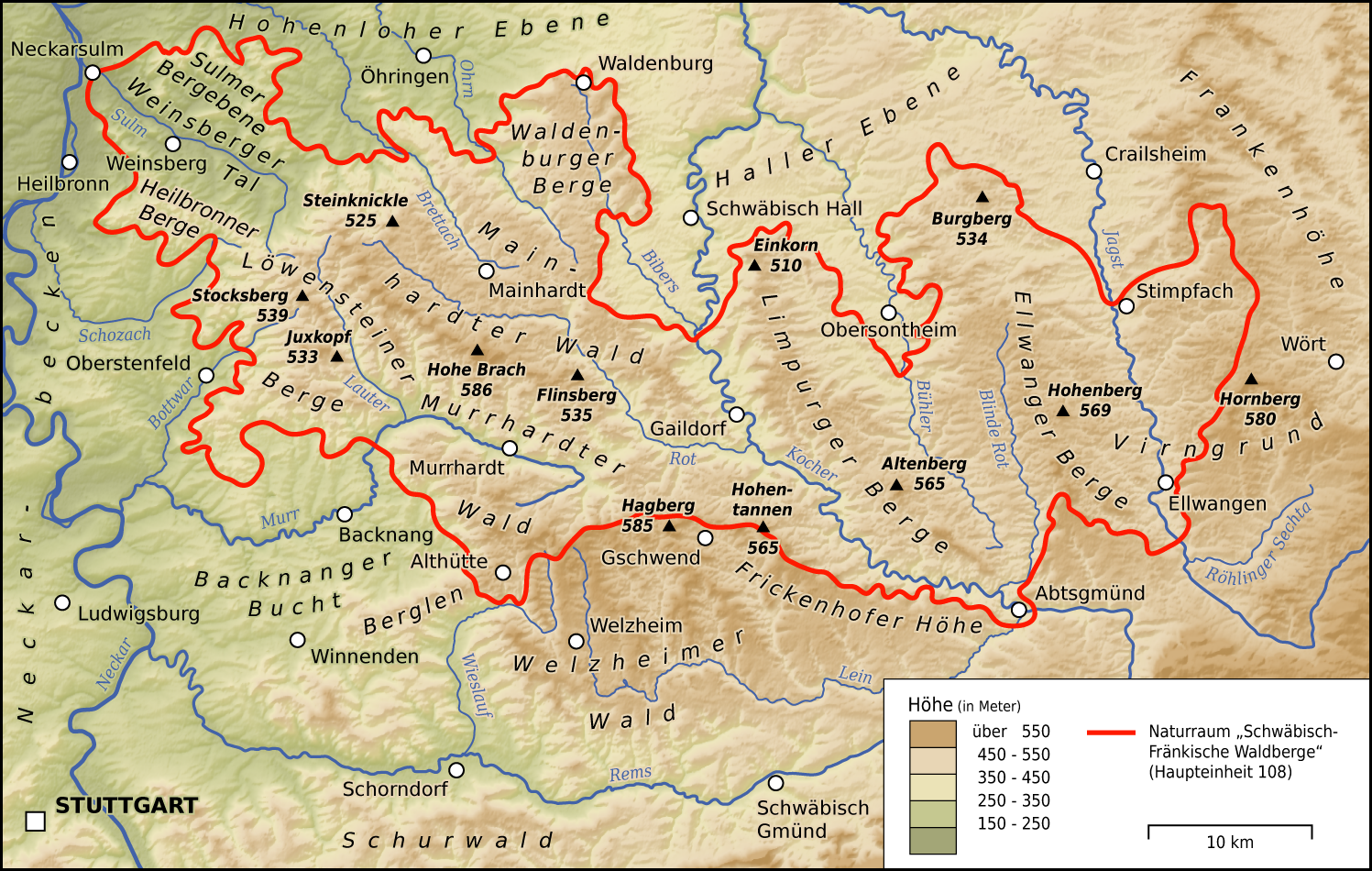
The Virngrund in the east and somewhat east and outside the natural region of the Swabian-Franconian Forest

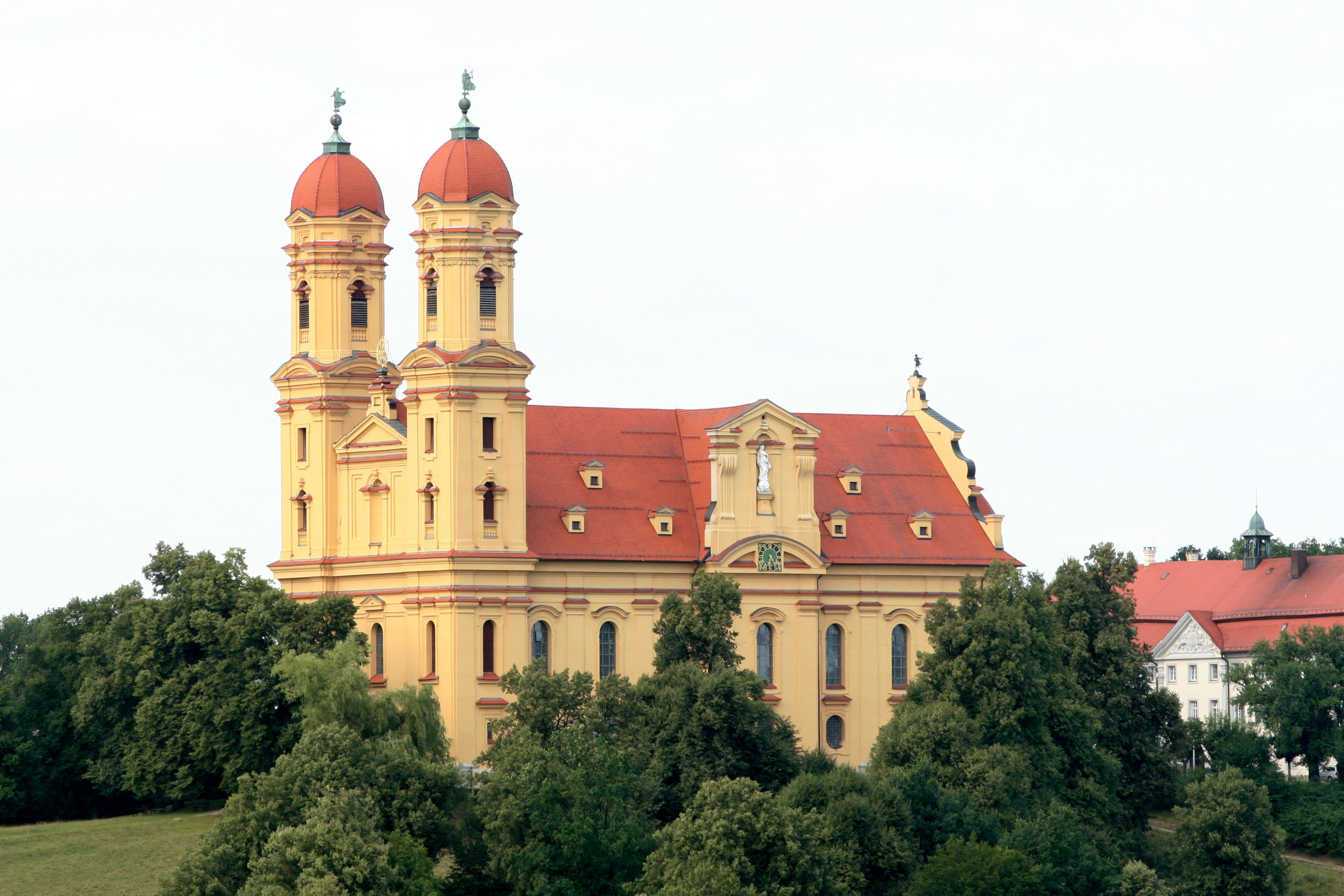
Schönenberg church on the edge of the Virngrund

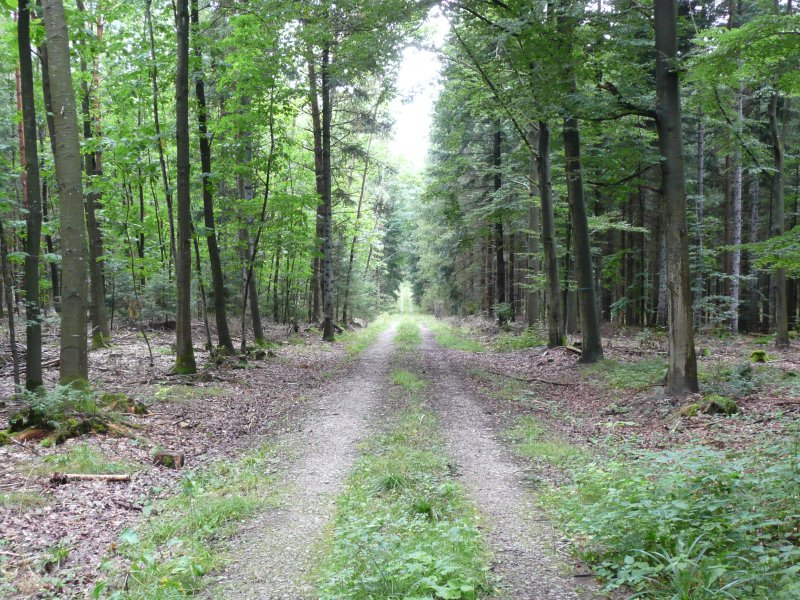
Forest path in the Virngrund

The Virngrund (also called the Firngrund) is a historical landscape in the counties of Ostalbkreis and Schwäbisch Hall in the German state of Baden-Württemberg. it is forested in many places and up to 580 m above sea level (NHN).

== Geography ==
=== Location ===
==== Historic landscape ====
The Virngrund lies between the Württemberg towns of Crailsheim in the north and Ellwangen in the south, as well as south of the Franconian Heights and the Crailsheimer Hart. It extends roughly from Bühlertann and Bühlerzell in the west via the Ellwangen Hills to Wört in the east. Its highest point is the 580.0 m high Hornberg. The River Jagst flows through the Virngrund from south to north and the B 290 federal highway and A 7 motorway cross the landscape; the latter runs through the Hornberg in the Virngrund Tunnel.
