= Haller Plain =

Plain in the German state of Baden-Württemberg

Coordinates: 48.2000°N 9.9833°E

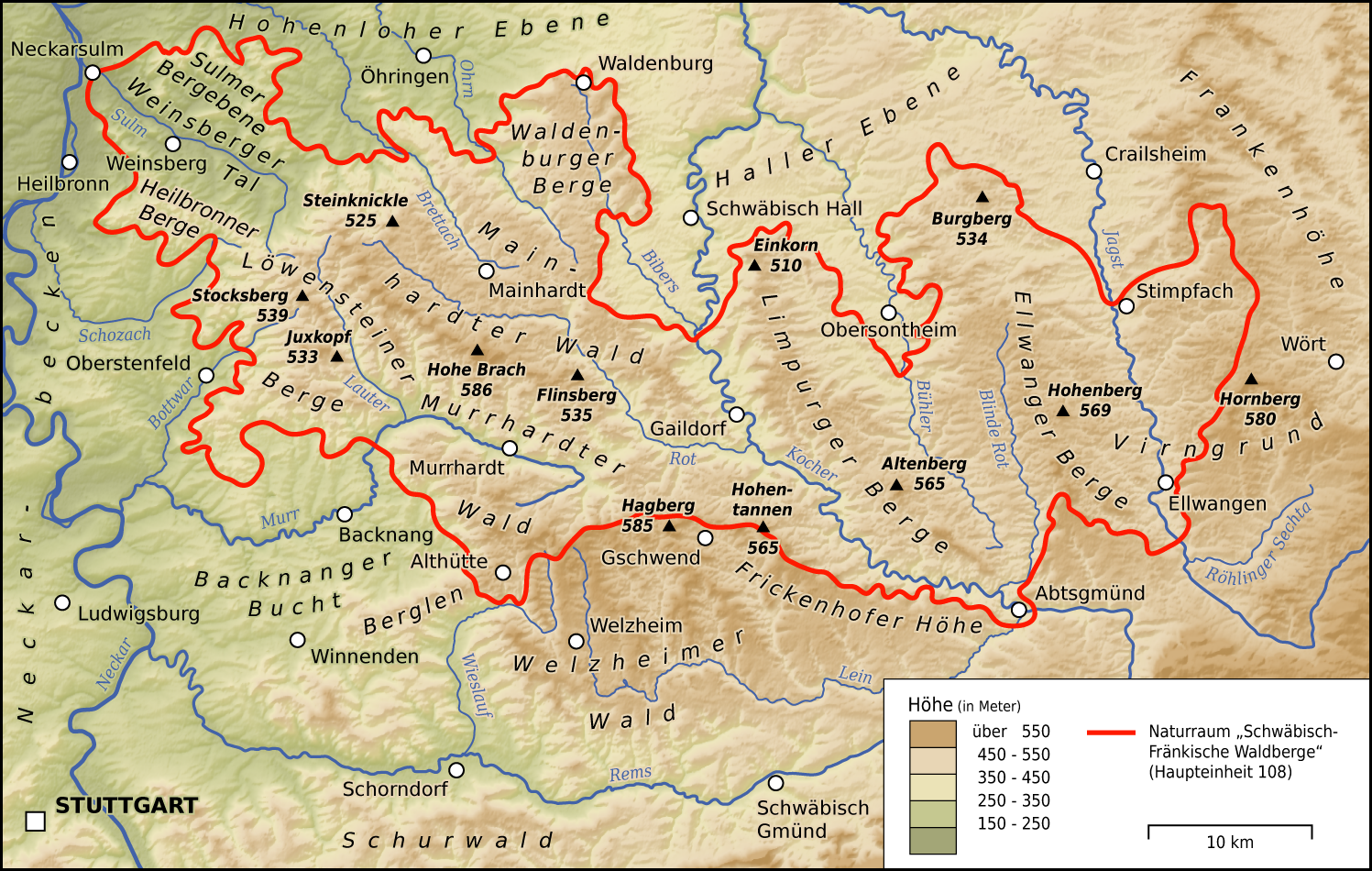
The Haller Plain (part of the Hohenlohe Plain) north of the Swabian-Franconian Forest

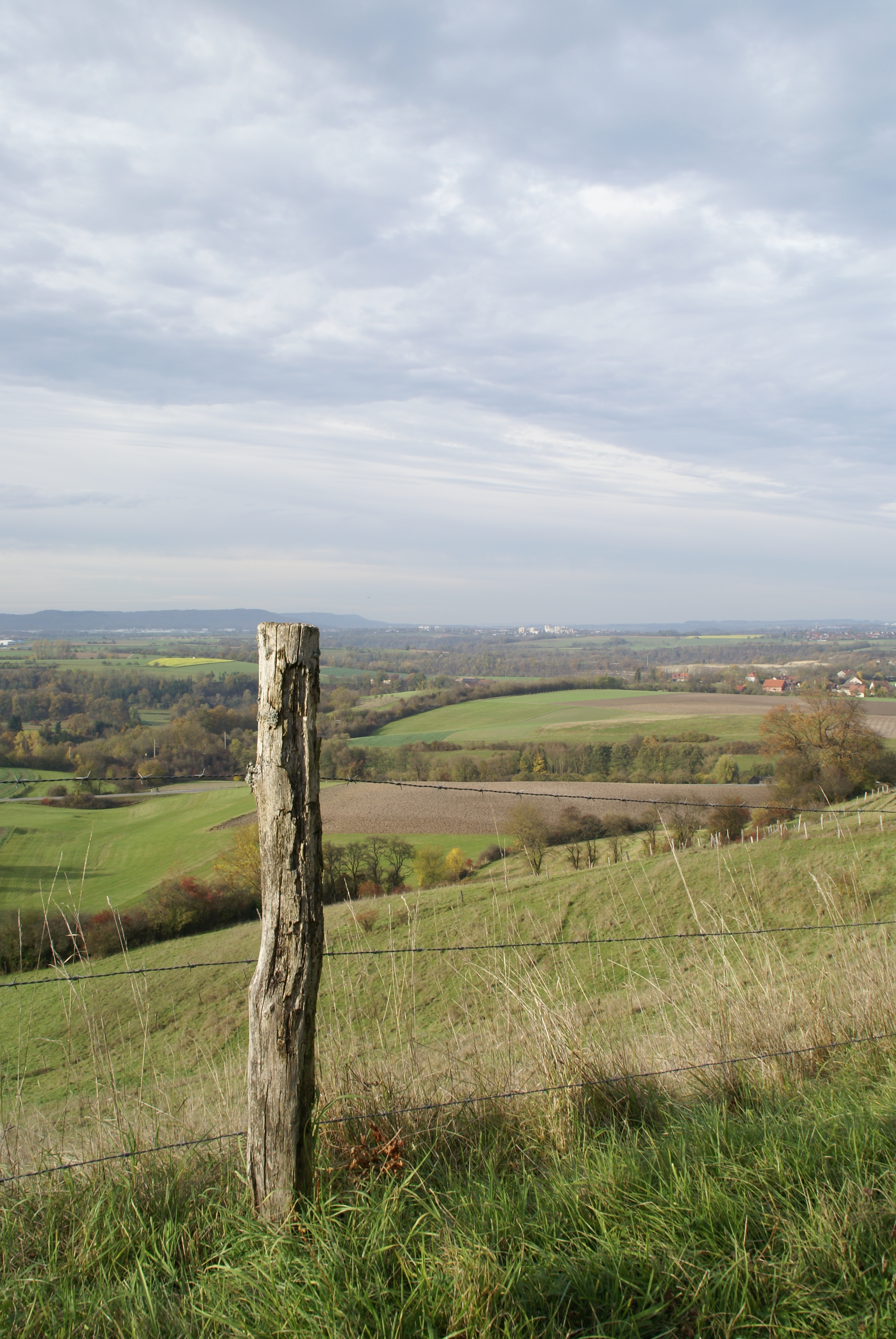
View from the Limpurg Hills near Michelbach of the Haller Plain. The Waldenburg Hills are on the left horizon

The Haller Ebene is a plain in the German state of Baden-Württemberg which forms part of the Hohenlohe Plain and stretches from Bad Mergentheim via Rothenburg, Uffenheim, Crailsheim, Öhringen as far as Schwäbisch Hall. The Haller Ebene specifically refers to that region of the Hohenloher Ebene around the town of Schwäbisch Hall.
