= Abtsgmünd =

- Municipality
- Coat of arms

- Location of Abtsgmünd within Ostalbkreis district
- Interactive map of Abtsgmünd
- Location within Germany Location within Baden-Württemberg
- Coordinates: 48°53′39″N 10°00′14″E
- Country: Germany
- State: Baden-Württemberg
- Admin. region: Stuttgart
- District: Ostalbkreis

Government
  - Mayor (2018–26): Armin Kiemel

Area
  - Total: 71.57 km^{2} (27.63 sq mi)
- Elevation: 375 m (1,230 ft)

Population (2025-12-31)
  - Total: 7,560
  - Density: 106/km^{2} (274/sq mi)
- Time zone: UTC+01:00 (CET)
  - Summer (DST): UTC+02:00 (CEST)
- Postal codes: 73453
- Dialling codes: 07366
- Vehicle registration: AA
- Website: www.abtsgmuend.de

Abtsgmünd (German pronunciation: [ˈaptsˌɡmʏnt]) is a municipality in the German state of Baden-Württemberg, in Ostalbkreis district. Abtsgmünd is located at the confluence of two streams, the Lein and the Kocher. The large area municipality consists of the main town of Abtsgmünd as well as the five districts of Neubronn, Laubach, Untergröningen, Hohenstadt and Pommertsweiler and their associated villages and hamlets. The municipality is a state-recognized recreation area in the Swabian-Franconian Forest Nature Park.

Until 2006, Abtsgmünd was host to the Summer Breeze Open Air metal festival.

== Geography ==
=== Geographic Location ===
Abtsgmünd has a share in the natural regions of the Eastern Alb Foreland and the Swabian-Franconian Forest Mountains, both of which belong to the Swabian Keuper-Lias Lands. With 71.6 km² and 7,456 inhabitants, the municipality of Abtsgmünd is the largest municipality in the Ostalbkreis district after the towns, both in area and population.

The main town of Abtsgmünd lies at the confluence of the Lein river into the Kocher (confluence elevation 367.4 m above sea level), predominantly on the left bank of the Kocher and left bank of the Lein. The furthest district of Untergröningen lies over 8 km west-northwest as the crow flies along two river bends on both sides of the Kocher, which there runs at about 355 meters above sea level after about 14 km of waterway.

=== Neighboring Municipalities ===
Clockwise from the north, Abtsgmünd borders Adelmannsfelden, Neuler and a small exclave of Hüttlingen, Aalen, Heuchlingen, Schechingen and Obergröningen, Eschach (all in the Ostalbkreis district), and Sulzbach-Laufen (Schwäbisch Hall district).

=== Municipal Division ===
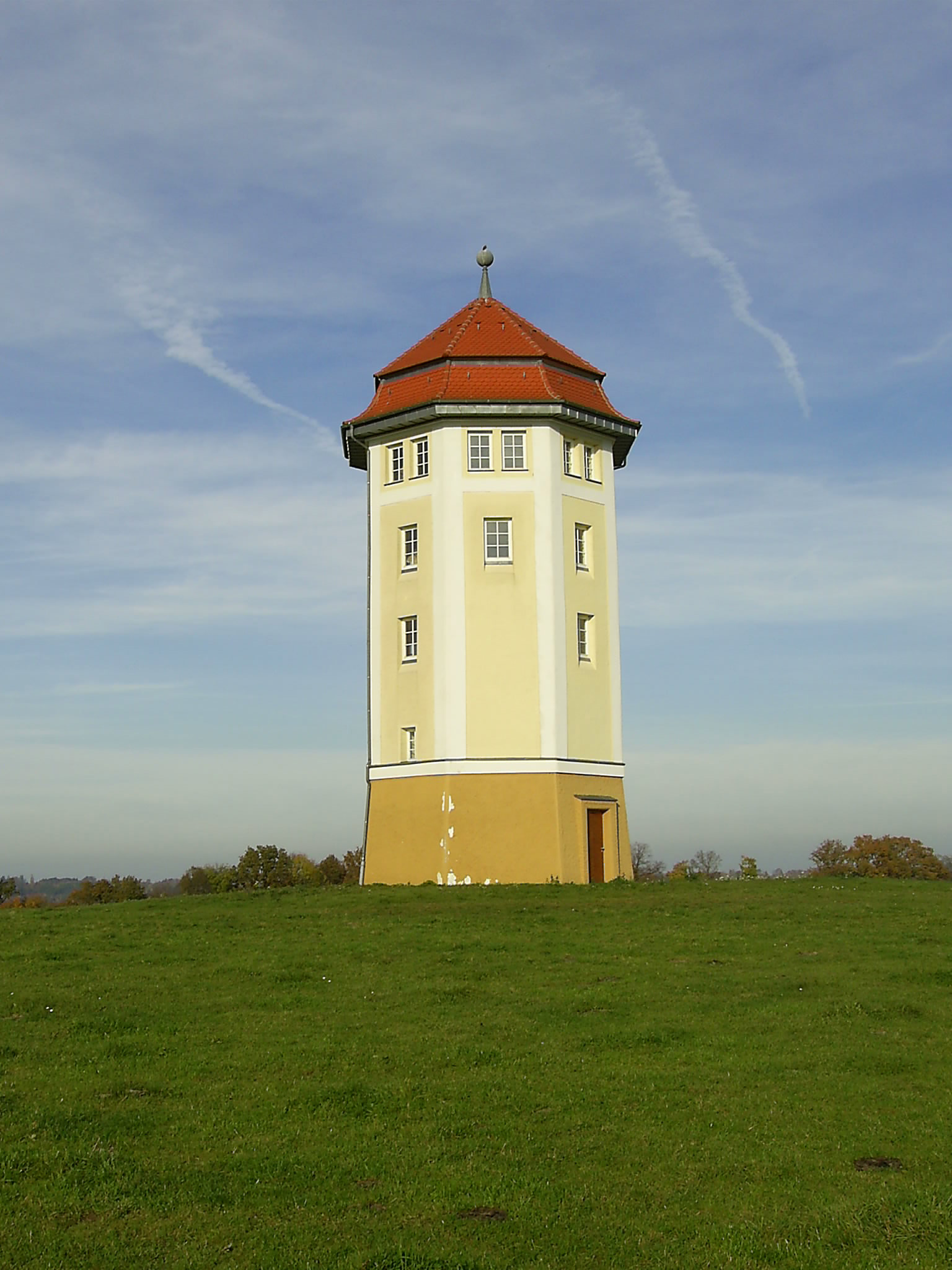
Water tower in the Hohenstadt district

The present-day municipality of Abtsgmünd includes the formerly independent municipalities of Abtsgmünd, Hohenstadt, Laubach, Neubronn, Pommertsweiler and Untergröningen with a total of almost 80 villages, hamlets, farms and houses.

In the Abtsgmünd district there is the village of Abtsgmünd, the hamlets of Altschmiede, Hangendenbuch, Neuschmiede, Schäufele, Vorderbüchelberg, Wilflingen and Wöllstein, the farmstead Birkholz and the residential areas Ausägmühle, Fischbach, Öl- und Sägmühle and Pulvermühle. In the Hohenstadt district there is the village of Hohenstadt, the hamlets of Börrat, Butzenberg, Christhäuser, Kocherhof, Köhrhof, Maisenhäuser, Reichertshofen, Rötenbach, Schafhäuser and Steinreute and the farms Bernhardshof, Brastelhof, Fischhaus, Frauenhof and Sandhof. In the Laubach district there is the village of Laubach, the hamlets of Berg, Haag and Leinroden (with Evangelical Church), the town of Roßnagel, the farms Blumenhof, Eichhornhof, Kauhof and Schneiderhaus and the residential area Lustenau. In the Neubronn district there is the village of Neubronn and the farms Eiderhalden, Kellerhaus and Spatzenmühle. In the Pommertsweiler district there is the village of Pommertsweiler, the hamlets of Hinterbüchelberg, Höfenhölzle, Hohenhöfen, Lutstrut, Seelach, Straßdorf, Wildenhäusle, Wildenhof and Zimmerberg, the farms Altweiher, Hammerschmiede, Herrenwald, Mittelhohlenbach (partly also in the Untergröningen district), Neumühle and Ziegelhütte and the residential area Oberhohlenbach (partly also in the Untergröningen district). In the Untergröningen district there is the village of Untergröningen, the hamlets of Billingshalden (Schweizerhof), Burren, Dinkbühl, Letten, Öchsenhof, Rötenbach, Rötenberg and Wegstetten and the residential areas Amselhöfle, Bach, Gschwendhof, Herrenfeld, Märzenhäusle, Mittelhohlenbach (partly also in the Pommertsweiler district), Oberhohlenbach (partly also in the Pommertsweiler district) and Tyrol. Defunct, no longer existing settlements include Wisemberg (Bisems?), Bläsihof and a castle in the Abtsgmünd district, Langenhalde in the Neubronn district, Buelenberg, Otolfsweiler, Deschental and Unterhohlenbach in the Pommertsweiler district as well as Hurrenhof or Steinhöfle, mill, sawmill on the Ochsenbach, Beim Gschwendhof, Steinhalden and Spitz in the Untergröningen district.

== History ==
=== Until the 18th Century ===
Abtsgmünd was likely founded from Ellwangen. The town gets its name from the confluence of the Lein into the Kocher river and its affiliation with Ellwangen Monastery (The Gemunden of the Abbot, as distinct from other Gemunden places). Thus, Abtsgmünd is likely an Ellwangen foundation after the 7th century, though the exact time is unknown.

The Ellwangen Monastery established the town to secure its forested area to the southwest. In a property directory of Ellwangen Monastery from 1136, Abtsgmünd is mentioned by the name Gemunden. In the 13th century, the name was changed to Abtzgemunde to avoid confusion with the later Imperial City of Gmünd. This name first appeared in a document by King Conrad IV in 1251.

The late Romanesque ground floor of the parish church tower, built around 1200, shows that the settlement existed earlier.

The Wöllstein Castle was built from Abtsgmünd to secure the rule against the Schenken von Limpurg. The owners changed frequently, but the feudal lordship of the Prince-Provostry of Ellwangen remained intact. An official was appointed to administer it, residing in Wöllstein. In 1609, Heuchlingen, Abtsgmünd and Wöllstein formed the Ellwangen district of Heuchlingen, with the district administrator's seat in Abtsgmünd.

Due to its affiliation with the Prince-Provostry of Ellwangen, Abtsgmünd remained Catholic during the Reformation, while the Kocher valley from Schwäbisch Hall up to Untergröningen became Protestant in 1544.

In the 17th century, the Prince-Provosts founded ironworks. In 1611, a blast furnace was established in Altschmiede in Abtsgmünd, later followed by a forging works. It was destroyed in the Thirty Years' War but rebuilt as a forging works in 1667. In 1699, the works were relocated from the Altschmiede district to Neuschmiede.

=== 19th and 20th Centuries ===
During the secularization in 1803, Abtsgmünd fell to the territories of New Württemberg and became part of the Kingdom of Württemberg in 1806. The Abtsgmünd ironworks became part of the Swabian Ironworks based in Wasseralfingen. From 1803 to 1934, Abtsgmünd belonged to the Oberamt of Aalen. During administrative reforms in Nazi-era Württemberg, Abtsgmünd was reassigned in 1934 to the Aalen district and in 1938 to the newly structured Aalen county. In 1945, the town became part of the American occupation zone and thus part of the newly founded state of Württemberg-Baden, which merged into the present state of Baden-Württemberg in 1952. Through the district reform in Baden-Württemberg in 1973, Abtsgmünd became part of the Ostalbkreis district.

=== Incorporation of Municipalities ===
As part of the municipal reform in Baden-Württemberg, five formerly independent municipalities were incorporated into Abtsgmünd. The municipal area and population more than doubled compared to the original municipality of Abtsgmünd.

Incorporations	Date	District Area
Neubronn	1 January 1971	473 hectares
Laubach	1 January 1971	479 hectares
Untergröningen	1 September 1971	1127 hectares
Hohenstadt	29 February 1972	1266 hectares
Pommertsweiler	1 July 1972	1762 hectares
Zum Vergleich	Abtsgmünd	2052 hectares

== Politics ==
=== Municipal Council ===
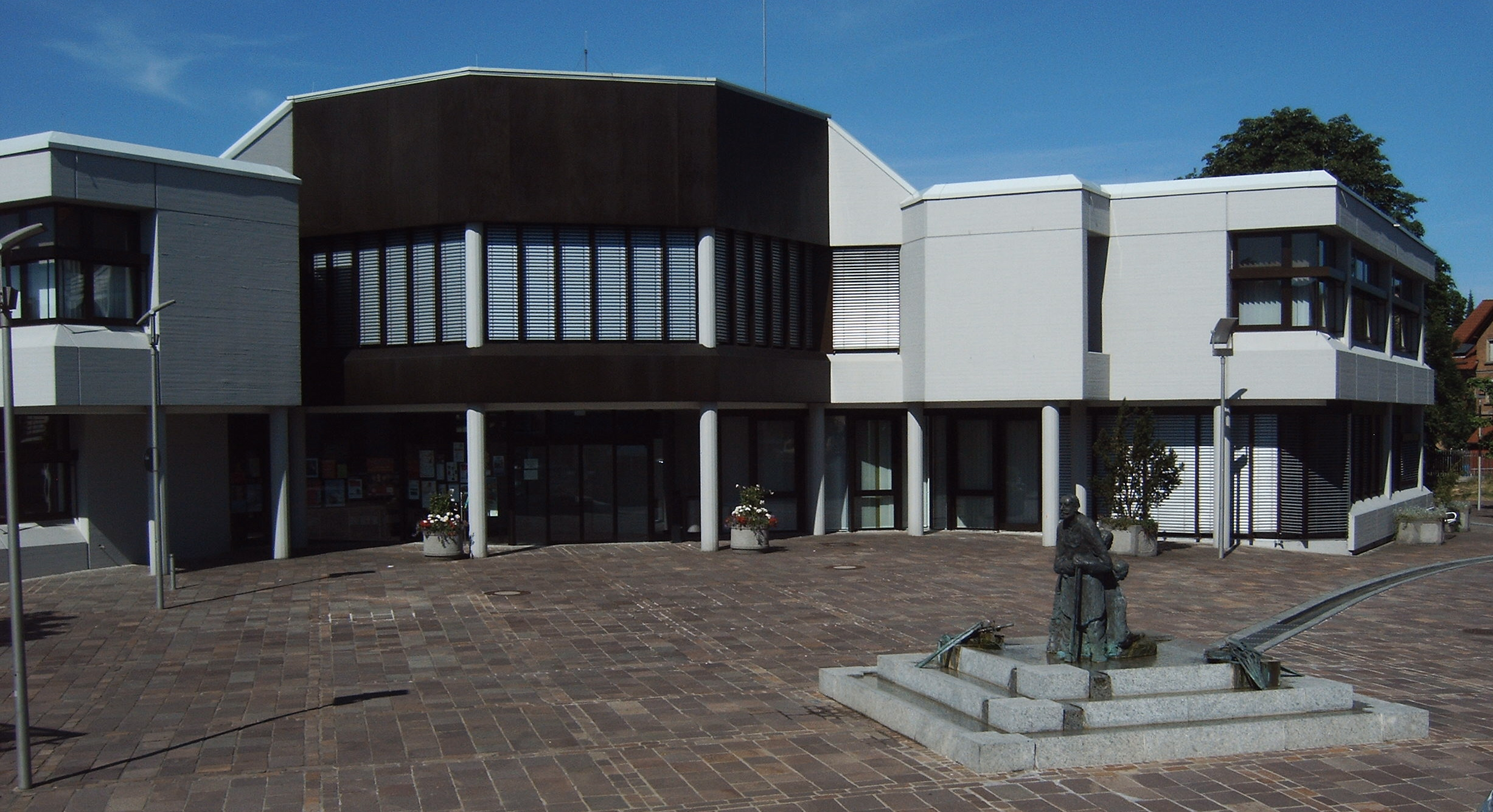
Town Hall

The municipal council was last elected in the Baden-Württemberg municipal elections on 26 May 2019 with a semi-direct district vote. It consists of 22 members with a five-year term. The seats are distributed among the individual parties and groups as follows. Voter turnout was 59.5% (2014: 53.8%).

Municipal Council of 2019
Faction	Election Result	Number of Seats	2014 Result
Free Voters	35.25%	8 seats	34.27%, 9 seats
CDU/UB	36.55%	8 seats	33.42%, 8 seats
SPD	28.20%	8 seats	32.31%, 8 seats

=== Coat of Arms ===
coat of arms of Abtsgmünd

Blazon: A divided escutcheon, in front gules an argent abbot's staff issuant from the base and turned with the crook to the line of division, in back argent three gules balls one above the other.

The abbot's staff refers to both the town's name and the Ellwangen Monastery and Prince-Provostry. The three red balls originate from the coat of arms of the Hack von Wöllstein family, who had their castle seat in Abtsgmünd.

The municipal flag is white-red.

Between 1911 and 1917, Abtsgmünd adopted a seal image showing, above a town view on a divided shield, an abbot's staff and a sword crossed diagonally, overlaid by a small shield with the Württemberg stag antlers. A continuous inverted chevron represented the Kocher and Lein rivers.

On 26 November 1956, the municipality was granted the current coat of arms and flag by the Baden-Württemberg Ministry of the Interior.

=== Municipal Logo ===
Since the mid-1990s, the municipality has had a municipal logo. It features a green A for Abtsgmünd and, as the crossbar of the letter A, the Lein and Kocher rivers in blue, at whose confluence Abtsgmünd was once founded.

=== Twin Towns ===
Since 2007, Abtsgmünd has had an official partnership with the Italian municipality of Castel Bolognese in the Emilia-Romagna region, Province of Ravenna. An exchange takes place with the Italian twin town every year.

== Judiciary ==
Abtsgmünd falls under the district court of Aalen; within the ordinary jurisdiction, the Ellwangen regional court and the Stuttgart higher regional court are superior. The responsible court for labor jurisdiction is the Stuttgart labor court, and for social jurisdiction the Ulm social court. Furthermore, the Stuttgart administrative court is locally responsible for public law disputes from Abtsgmünd.

== Economy and Infrastructure ==
=== Transportation ===
Abtsgmünd lies on Federal Highway 19 between Aalen and Schwäbisch Hall. The connection to Federal Autobahn 7 at Westhausen is about 15 kilometers away. The district of Untergröningen was the terminus of the Upper Kochertalbahn railway line from Gaildorf, discontinued in 2005 and largely dismantled in 2009.

=== Companies ===
The defining company in the main town of Abtsgmünd is Kessler + Co. GmbH & Co. KG, a specialty factory established in 1950 with over 400 employees for the production of axles and gearboxes for specialty vehicles.

In the district of Untergröningen, Holopack Verpackungstechnik GmbH manufactures and packages products for the pharmaceutical industry.

=== Educational Institutions ===
With the Friedrich-von-Keller-Schule, Abtsgmünd has an elementary, secondary modern and secondary school, to which the Wasenschule, a pure elementary school, also belongs as a branch. In addition, the St. Jakobus-Gymnasium has been in operation since 2010. There are also elementary schools in Hohenstadt, Pommertsweiler and Untergröningen. For the youngest residents of Abtsgmünd, there is a Roman Catholic kindergarten (St. Josef Kindergarten), two Protestant kindergartens, and a forest kindergarten that opened in 2016.

=== Social Institutions ===
- Hallgarten Senior Center of the Haus Lindenhof Foundation - Nursing Home
- Sozialstation Abtsgmünd gGmbH - Home Care Service

== Gallery ==
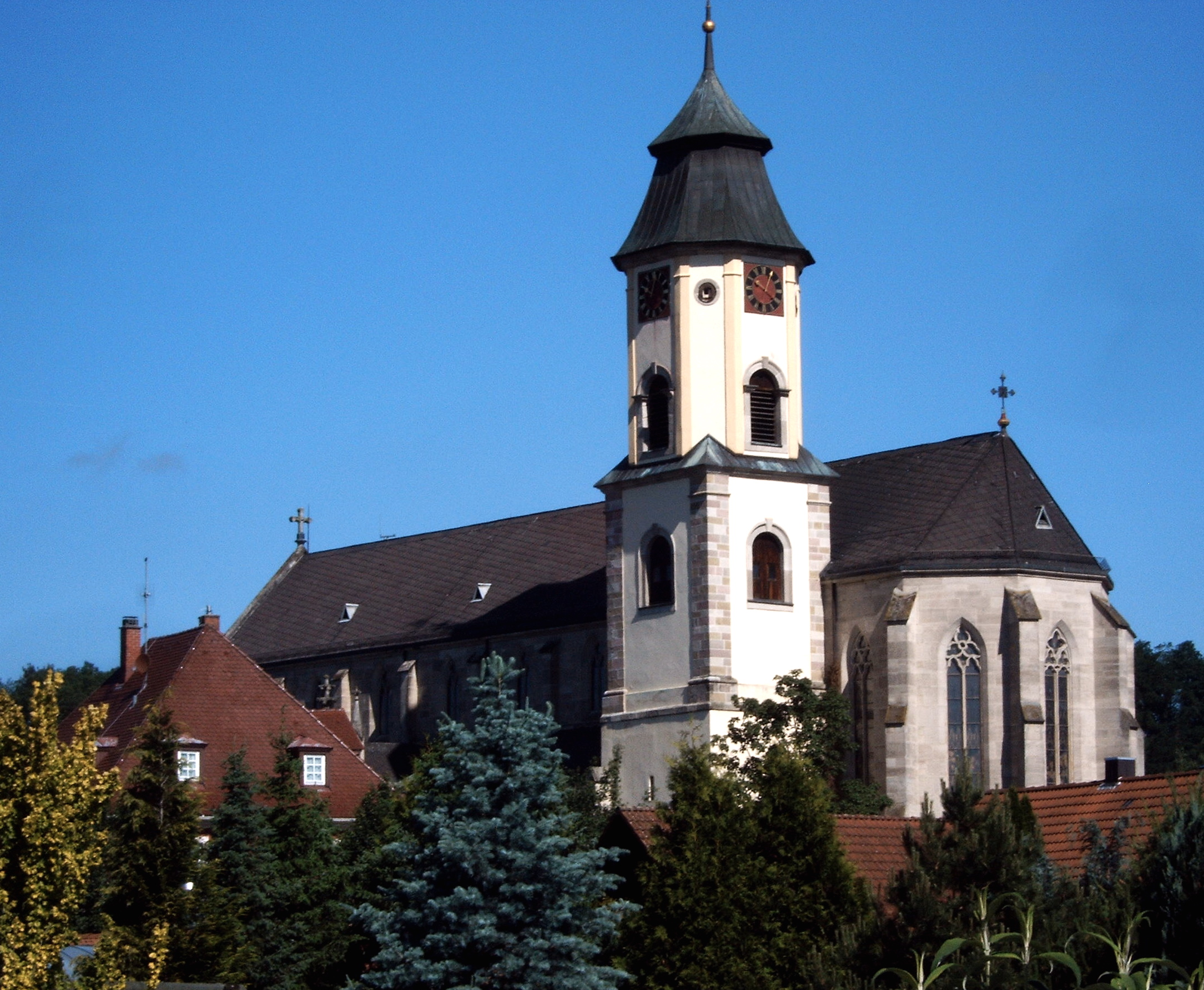
Saint Michael's church, Abtsgmünd

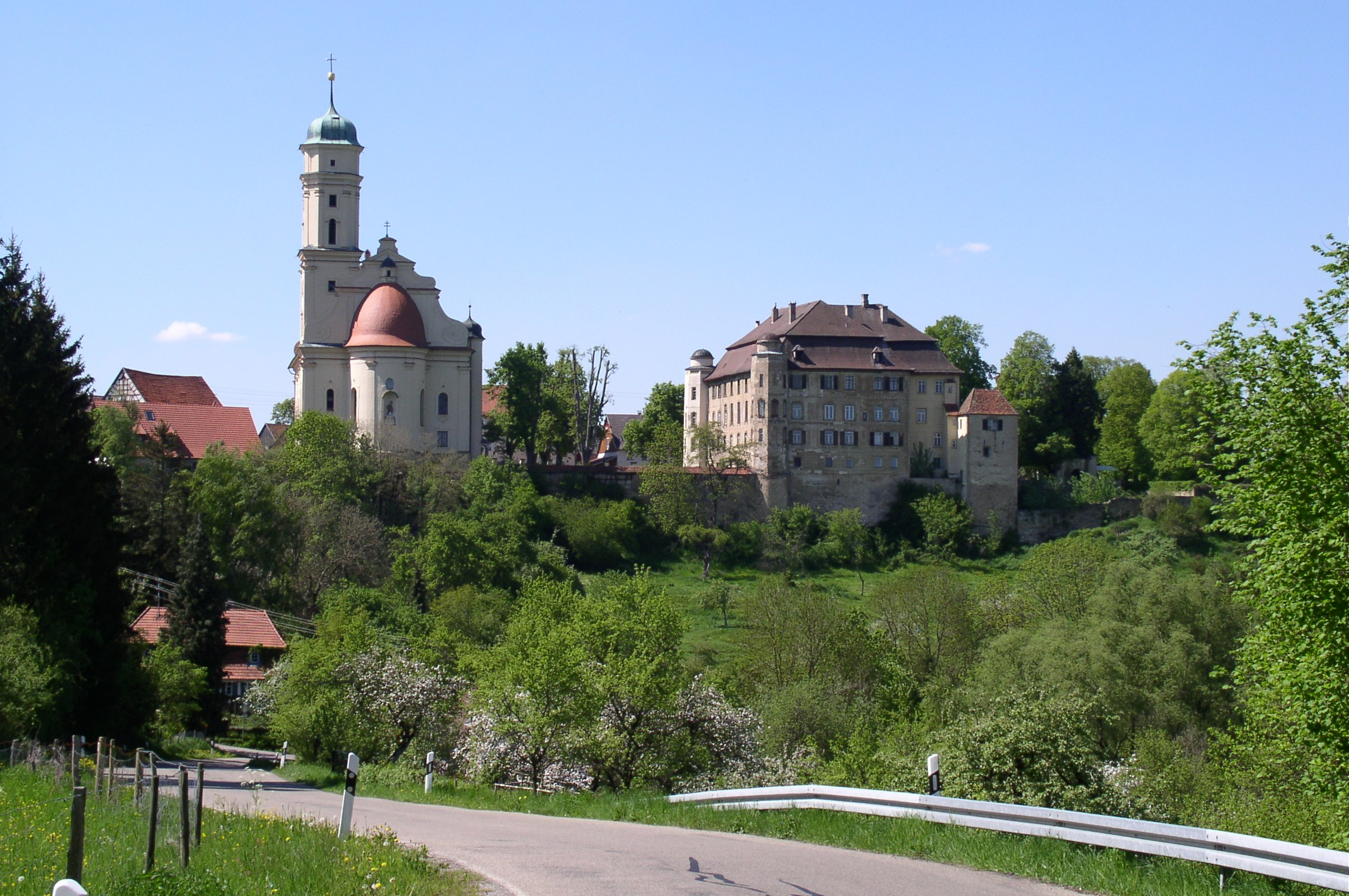
Schloss and church Hohenstadt

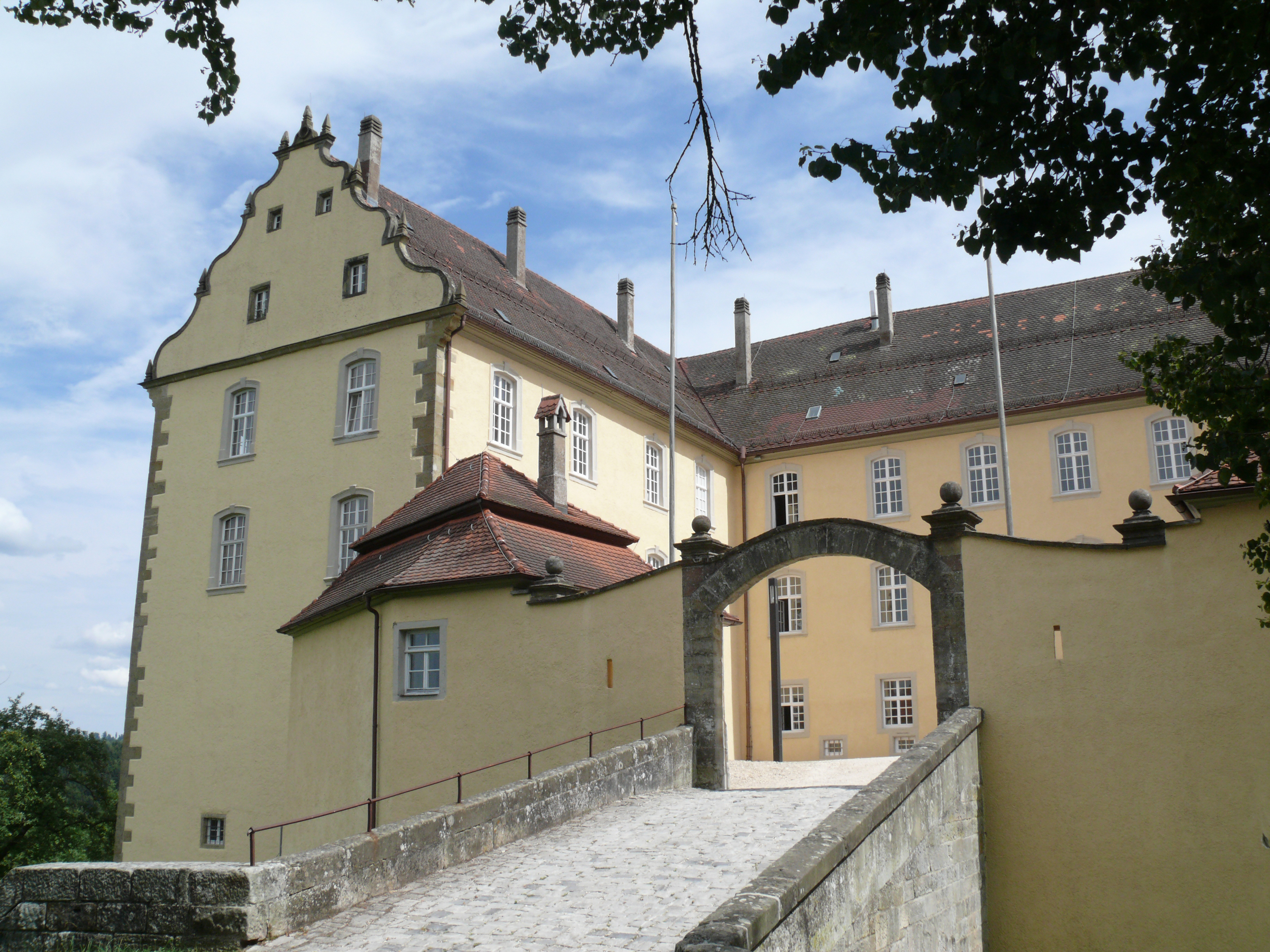
Schloss Untergröningen

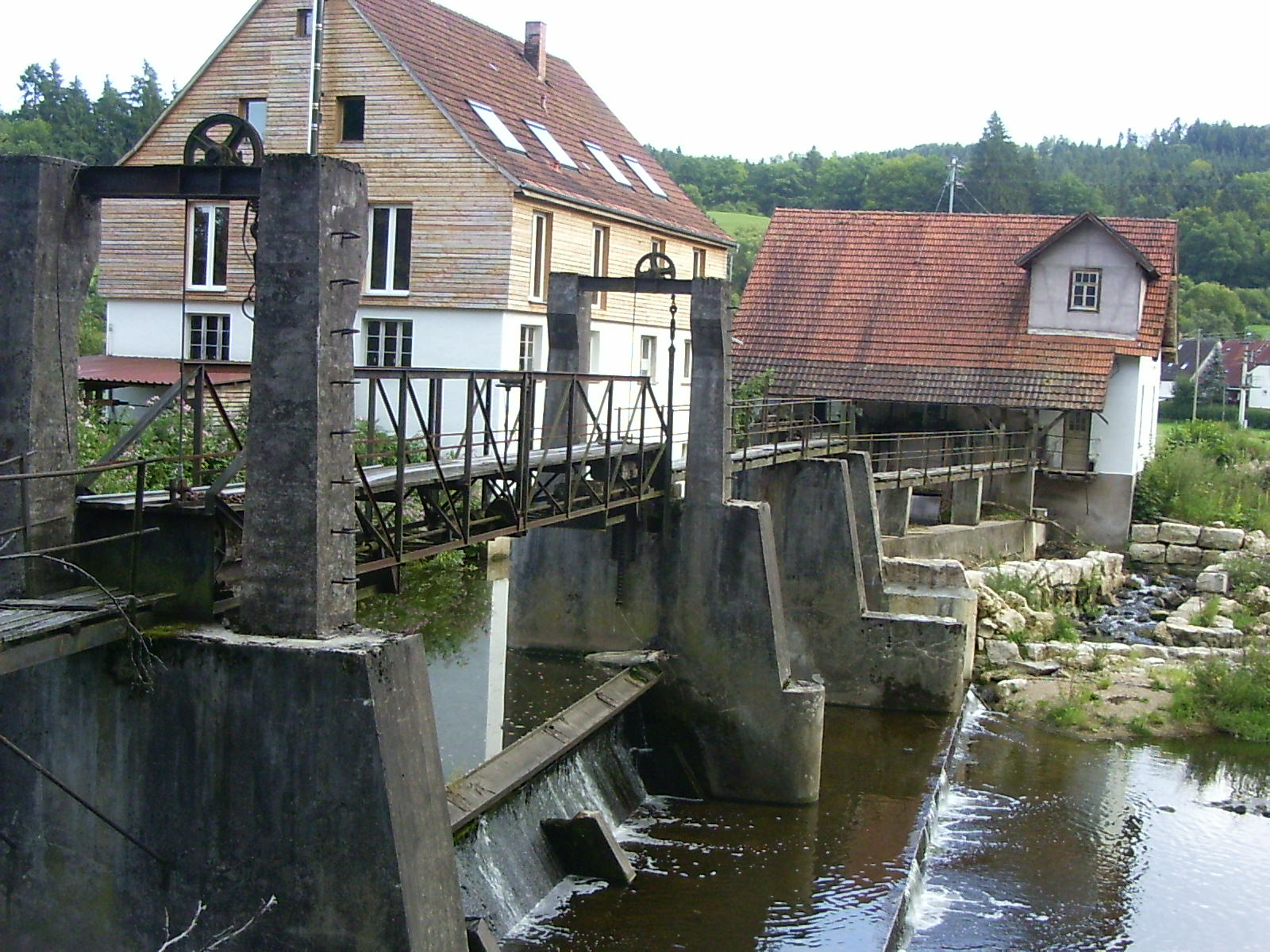
Kocher dam

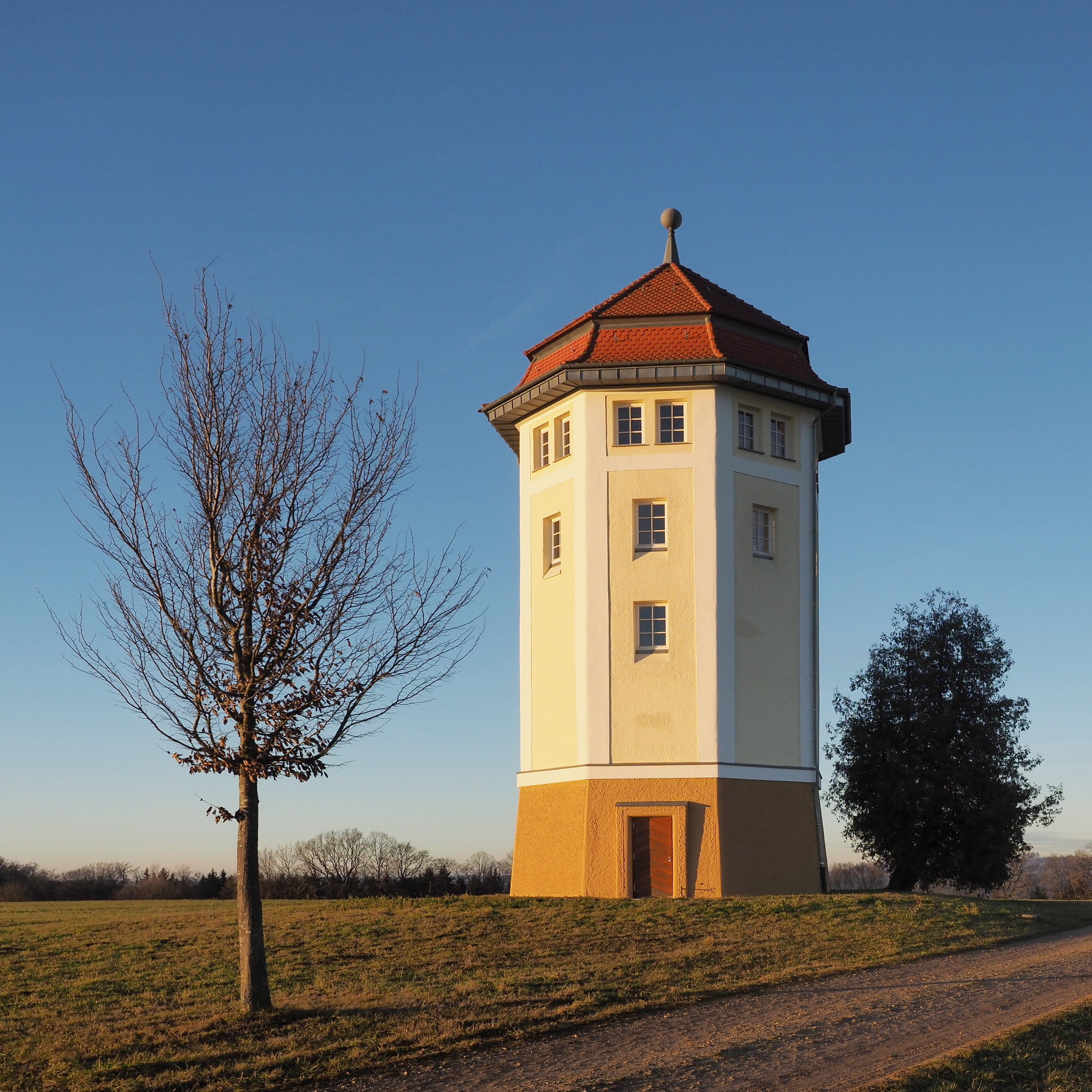
Hohenstadt water tower

=== Born in Abtsgmünd ===
- Karl Allmendinger (1891-1965), General of the Wehrmacht
- Albert Schnez (1911-2007), General of the Bundeswehr
- Patrick Benedict Zimmer who was born in the town
