= Albtrauf =

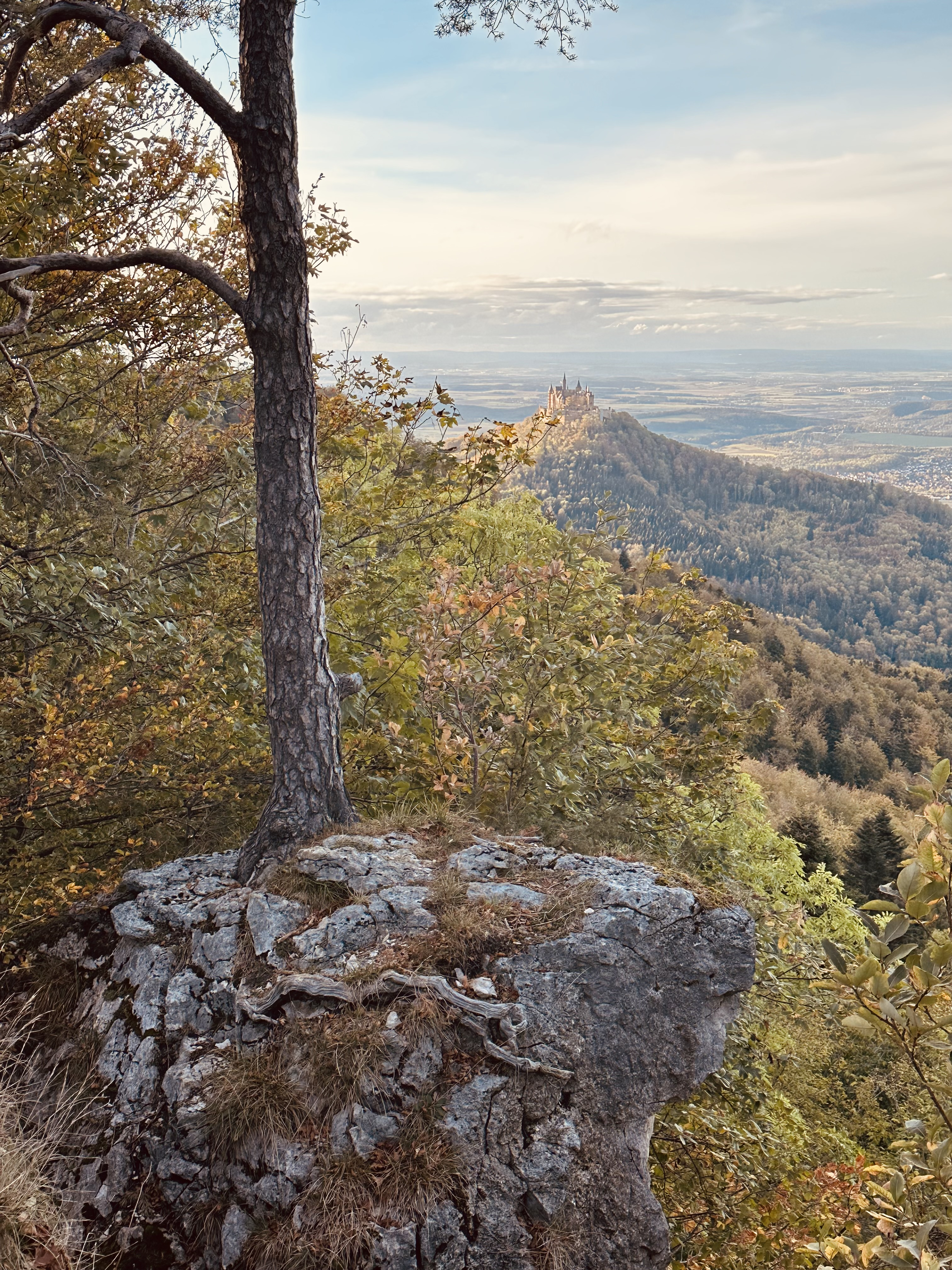
The Albtrauf next to the Backofen Cliffs. Background: Hohenzollern Castle on top of Hohenzollern mountain.

The term Albtrauf (Alp escarpment) refers to the northwest facing escarpment of the Swabian Alps, situated in Baden-Württemberg and Bavaria. It is the most distinctive stepped slope within the alpine region of the South German Scarplands, leading roughly from the southwest to the northeast.

The Albtrauf has its geological extension in the northeast, in the stepped slopes of the Franconian Jura and in the southwest and west among the Jurassic period stepped slopes of the Baaralb, Hegaualb, Randen, Klettgau, Aargau as well as the Table Jura stretches from the city of Basel to the Ajoie and the French Scarplands.

In geology and geomorphology, however, the term “Trauf” merely describes the brink of the stepped slopes where various stepped surfaces meet (which is not developed in hipped steps).

== Geography ==
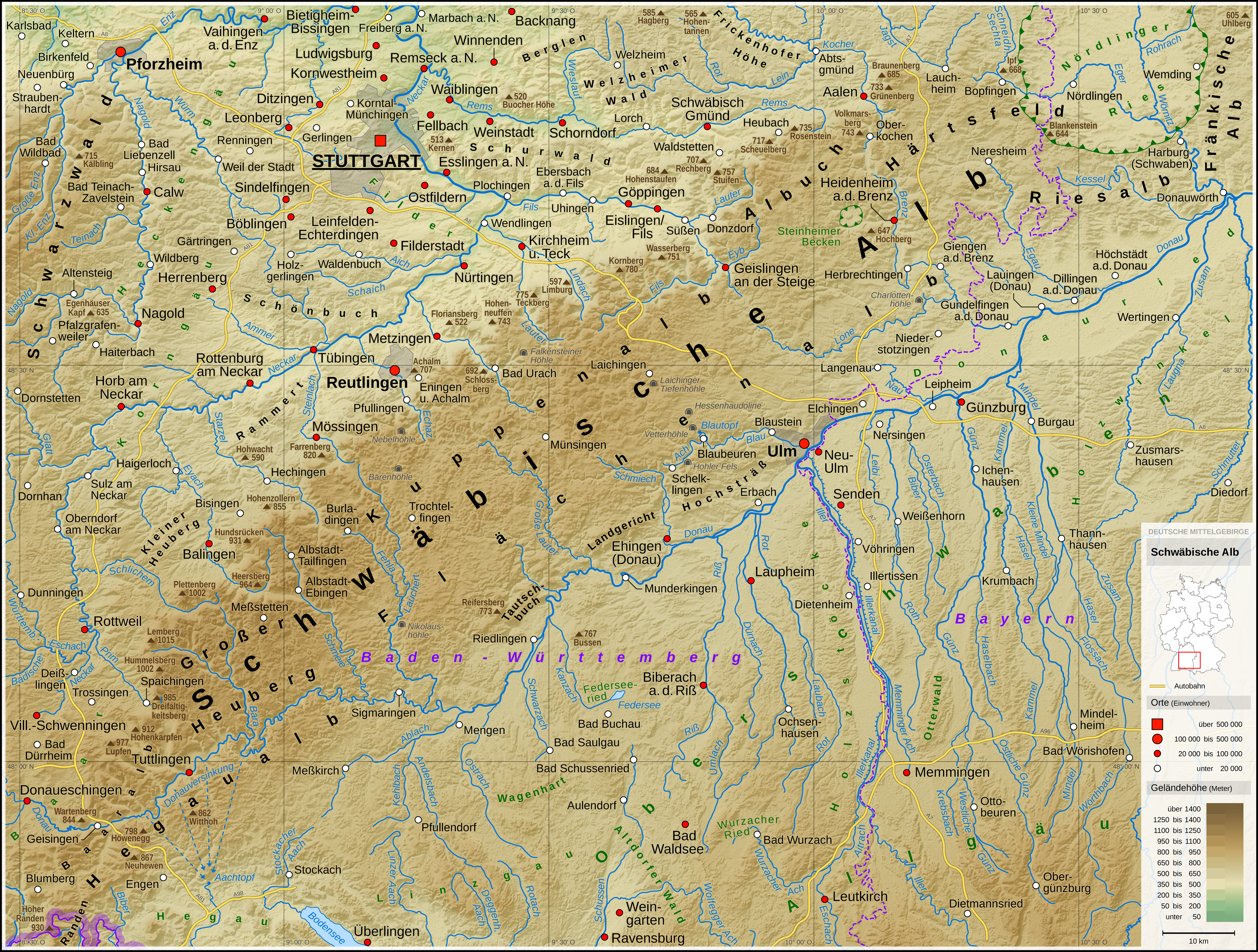
Swabian Alps

Like the entirety of the Swabian Alps, the Albtrauf leads from the southwest to the northeast, approximately following the line of Donaueschingen–Lemberg–Balingen–Reutlingen–Kirchheim unter Teck–Gingen an der Fils–Unterkochen. On a closer look it is markedly interrupted by many deeply eroded valleys.

The protruding inliers and outliers (German: Zeugenberge) support famous castles, which are visible from a great distance, such as the Hohenzollern Castle, the Hohenneuffen Castle and the Teck Castle. Major traffic routes leading from the alpine foothills to the Albtrauf are known as the Alb ascension (German: Albaufstieg), the best known of them being the Geislinger Steige.

== Geology ==
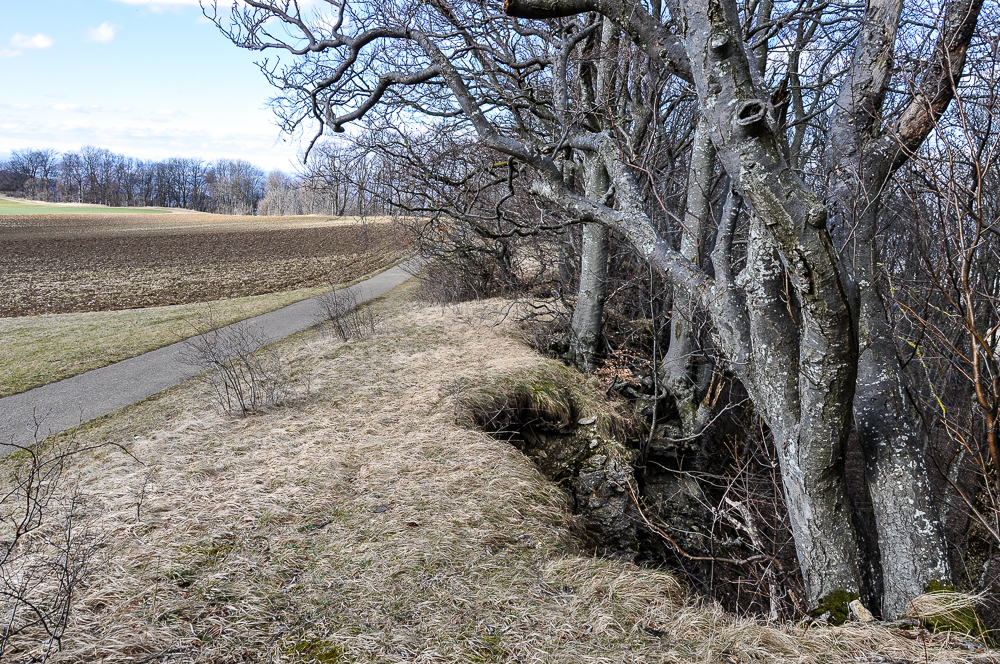
Typical view along the edge of the Albtrauf: the relatively level plateau, often used for agriculture, abruptly meets the mostly wooded slope.

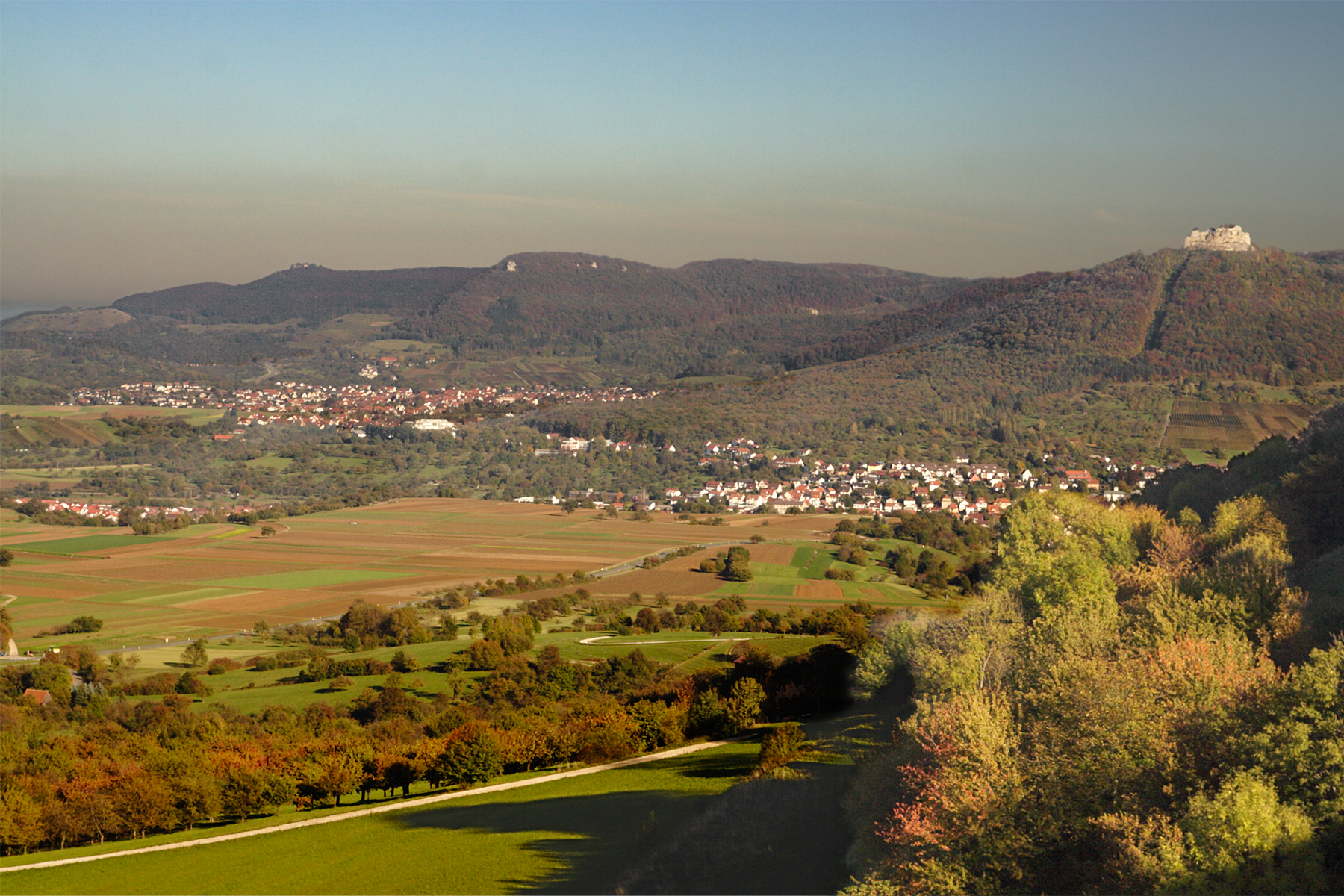
Albtrauf. Foreground: Neuffen and Hohenneuffen Castle; left: Beuren; furthest back: Teck Castle (Mid Alps)

The Albtrauf is made up of an upper rock layer of the Brown Jurassic and lower and middle layers of the White Jurassic. The harder layers of the Brown Jurassic act as the foundation of this bed and so form the highest, often weakly developed layer of the Alpine foothills. The Brown Jurassic differs regionally: Sandflaserschichten (Quenstedtsche Gliederung B β) in the eastern Alps, Blaukalke (B γ) in the mid Alps, oolithische Kalkmergel (B δ) in the western Alps. The lower section of the stepped slope are made up of the claystone layers of the Brown Jurassic, stretching to the Ornatenton Formation which ends this section. The equally soft Kalkmergel (W α) follows as the first layer of the White Jurassic. Hard limestone acts as a layer-former in the W β, (as reef limestone in the western Alps, and otherwise as the mural Wohlgeschichtete Kalk Formation), as well as in the W δ (reef limestone is found across the whole region, but especially in the young layers). In between these is a marl complex.

== Geomorphology ==
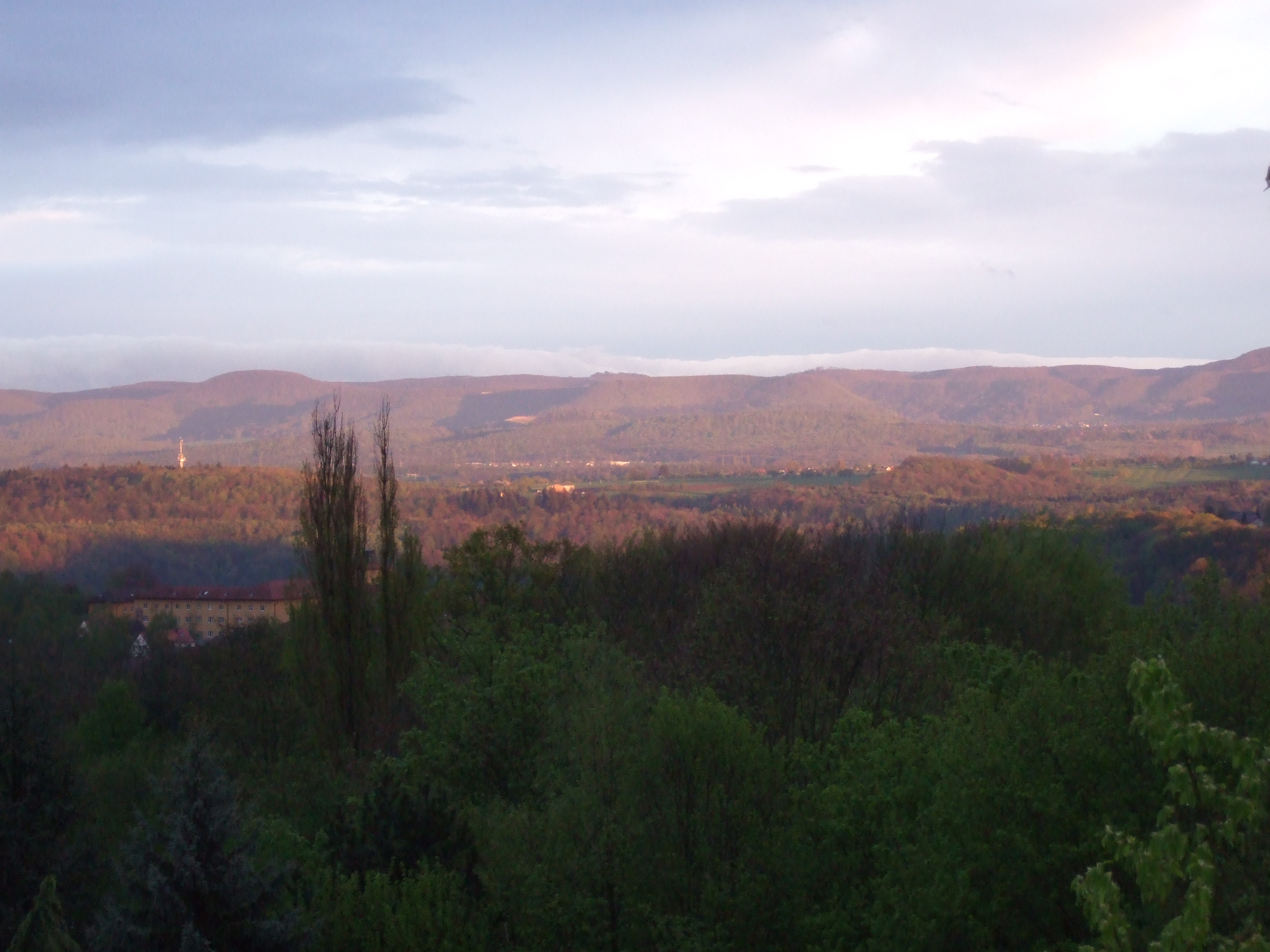
Albtrauf, viewed from Tübingen

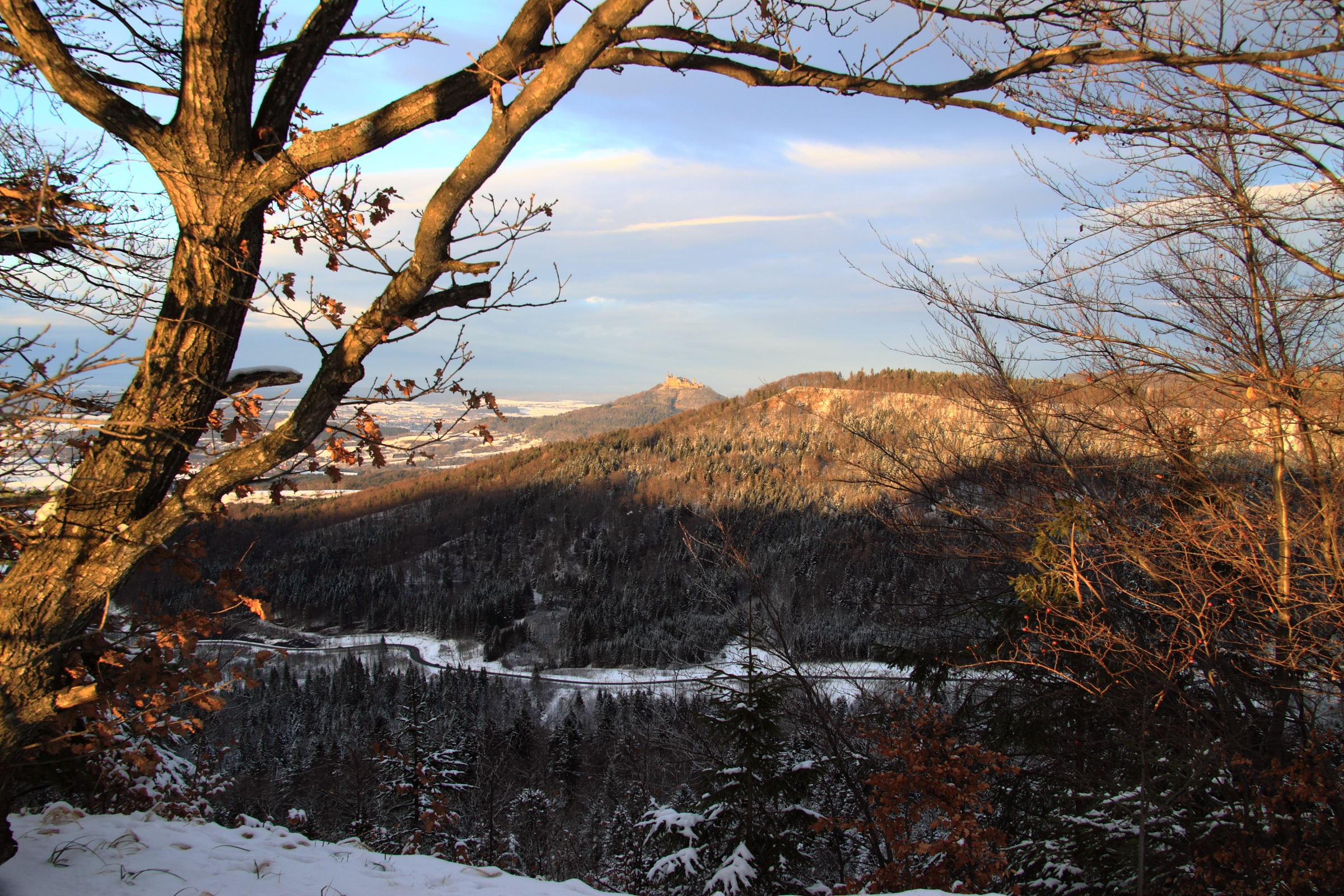
Albtrauf viewed from Irrenberg, with Hohenzollern Castle and Heiligenkopf

The intermediate inclination of the Albtrauf amounts to roughly 35 degrees. In the Erms valley region and near Balingen the Albtrauf reaches an average height of nearly 400m. The edge of the slope is at approximately 1000 metres above sea level (German: Normalhöhennull, English: standard elevation zero) in the southwest and at approximately 650 metres above sea level in the northeast.

In the Eastern Alps and in parts of the Mid Alps (up to Bad Urach) W ß does not appear as a layer-former, but as escarpment in the slope which climbs up to the W δ. W ß and W δ levels, the latter being about 100 m high, are distinctly pronounced from Reutlingen to Mössingen. Further to the west the W ß forms both the front of the Albtrauf and an adjoining dip slope, which is several kilometres broad. Moreover, the W δ step, which includes inliers and outliers located on the outskirts such as Kornbühl, is receding.

Retrogressive erosion has caused the Albtrauf to recede southeast by an average of few millimeters each year. This process is responsible for the deep dips and embayment along the Albtrauf. Landslides and rockfalls also contribute to this process. The ensemble of relief features includes cuestas, rock ledges, spurs and inliers. The most famous inliers and outliers without a dip slope include, from northeast to southwest, Ipf, Hohenstaufen, Achalm and Hohenzollern (Zoller). Kaltes Feld, Michelsberg, Farrenberg, the plateau of Burgfelden (Böllat-Heersberg) and Plettenberg rank among the most impressive inliers and outliers with a dip slope.

== Miscellaneous ==
The vegetation consists mainly of beech forest. Juniper heathland, typical of the high plains of the Swabian Alps, can also be found in scattered locations, such as on Jusi, and is generally under conservation. Slow-growing oaks grow on the rocky outcrops. Spruce and fir forest can also be found in the Hohen Schwabenalb (high Swabian Alps) as a result of forestry atypical for the area. White outcrops of reef limestone protruding out of the forest all around are also characteristic. The Albtrauf was poetically dubbed “Blue Wall” by Eduard Mörike, owing to the pale blue shimmer that appears when it is viewed from a distance. The Schwäbische-Alb-Nordrand-Weg (Hauptwanderweg 1, HW 1), a hiking trail maintained by the Schwäbischen Albverein (Swabian Jura Association), provides access to the Albtrauf and leads from Donauwörth to Tuttlingen.

== Sport ==
- Trail mountainbike: Tieringen Albtrauf to Balingen-Weilstetten Lochenpass, 4.7 km, car road, bike trail, 1.9 km downhill.

== Images ==
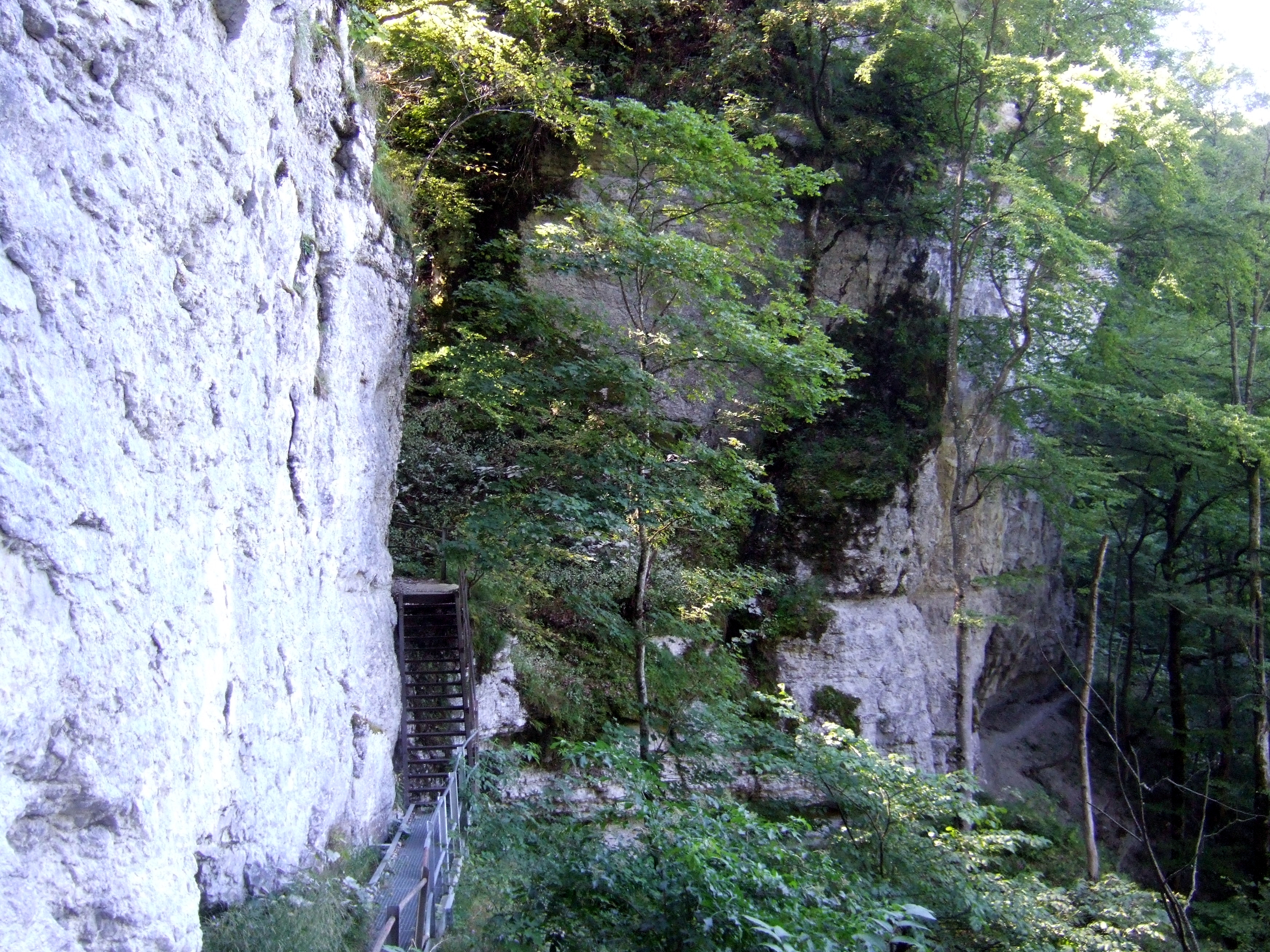
Albtrauf at Hossinger Leiter

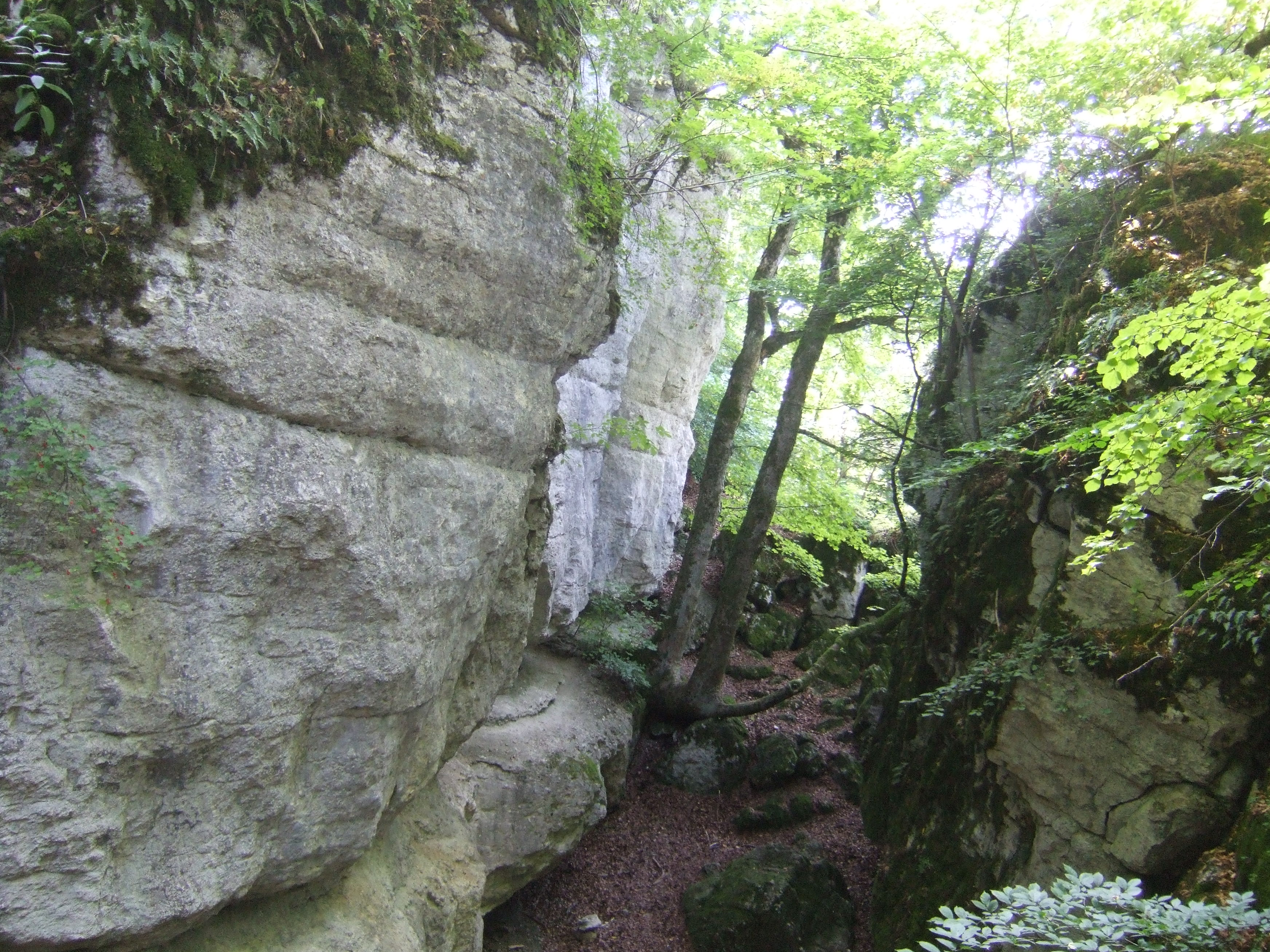
Split rock (split rock) at Schafberg

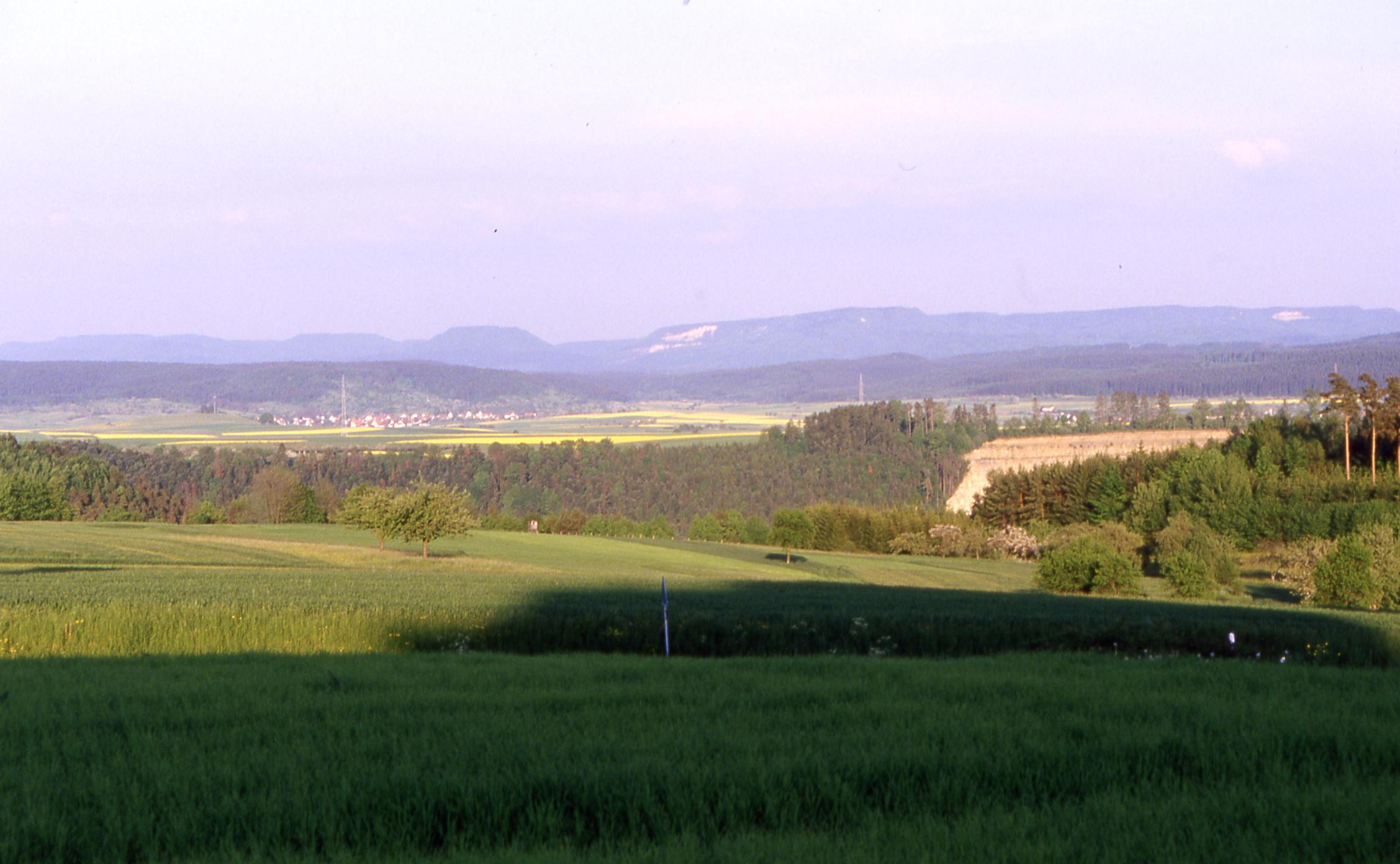
View of the Albtrauf from Hochmark near Frommenhausen

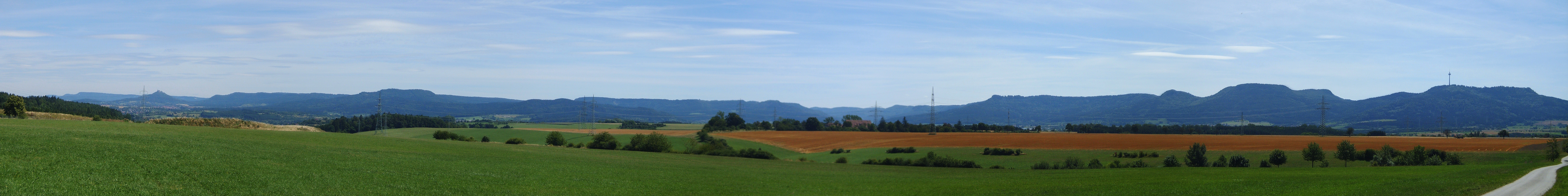
View of the Albtrauf. From left to right: Farrenberg, Hohenzollern Castle and Plettenberg.

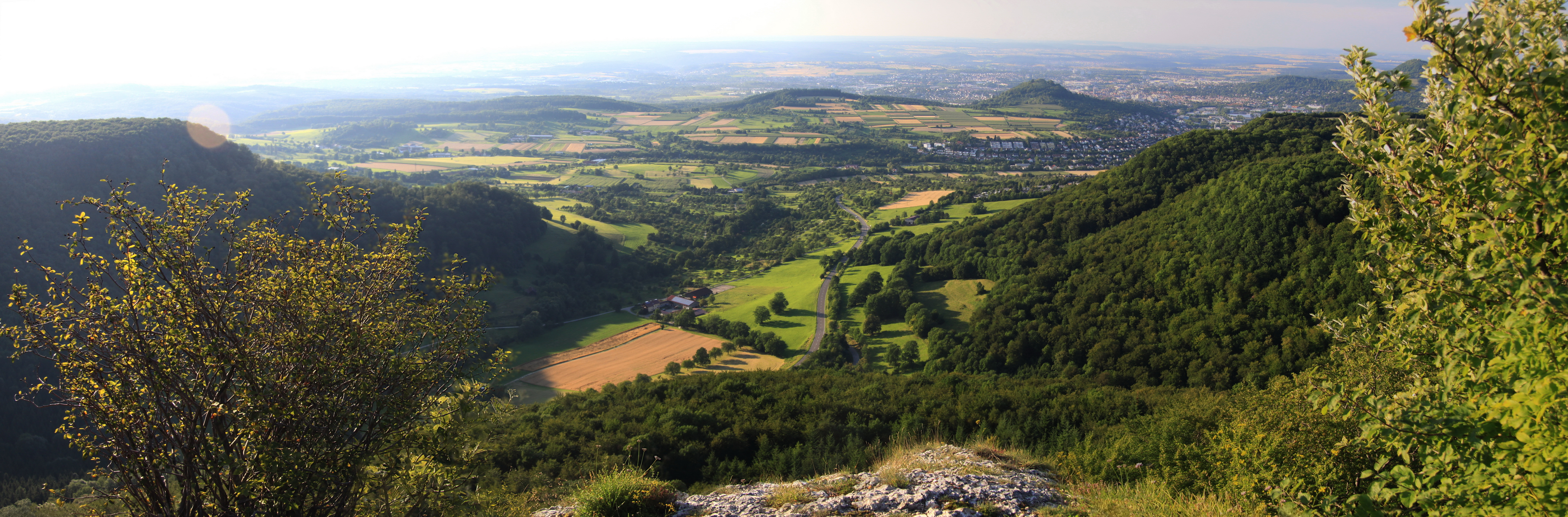
View from Wackerstein (825.9m) south of Reutlingen with inliers and outliers; left: Scheibenbergle, middle: Gaisbühl and Georgenberg (Reutlingen), right: Pfullingen to the north, and Reutlingen with Scheibengipfel Hill and Achalm.

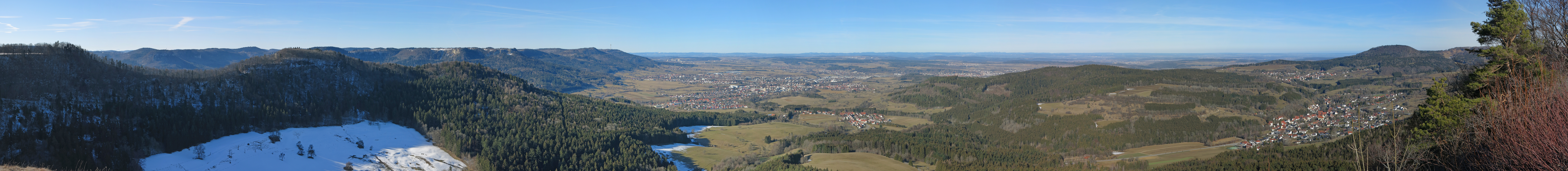
View of the Albtrauf from Böllat (922.3 m), southeast of Balingen

== Literature ==
- Reiner Enkelmann, Dieter Ruoff, Wolfgang Wohnhas: Der Albtrauf. Natur und Kultur zwischen Ries und Randen. Silberburg-Verlag, Tübingen und Lahr/Schwarzwald 2010. ISBN 978-3-87407-892-4
- Otto F. Geyer und Manfred P. Gwinner: Einführung in die Geologie von Baden-Württemberg. Stuttgart 1964, S. 60 ff. und S. 148 ff.
- Klaus Eberhard Bleich: Das Alter des Albtraufs. In: Jahreshefte des Vereins für vaterländische Naturkunde in Württemberg 115, Stuttgart, 1. November 1960, S. 39–92
