= Joseph's Dream =

Joseph's Dream may refer to:

- Joseph's Dream (Crespi), a 1620s painting by Daniele Crespi in the Kunsthistorisches Museum, Vienna
- Joseph's Dream (Rembrandt, 1645), an oil-on-canvas painting in the Königliche Museum, Berlin
- Joseph's Dream (studio of Rembrandt, 1650–1655), an oil on canvas painting by Barent Fabritius et al. in the Museum of Fine Arts, Budapest
- The dreams of Joseph in the Book of Genesis
- The four dreams of St Joseph in Matthew's Gospel
