= The Dream of Saint Joseph (La Tour) =

Painting by Georges de La Tour

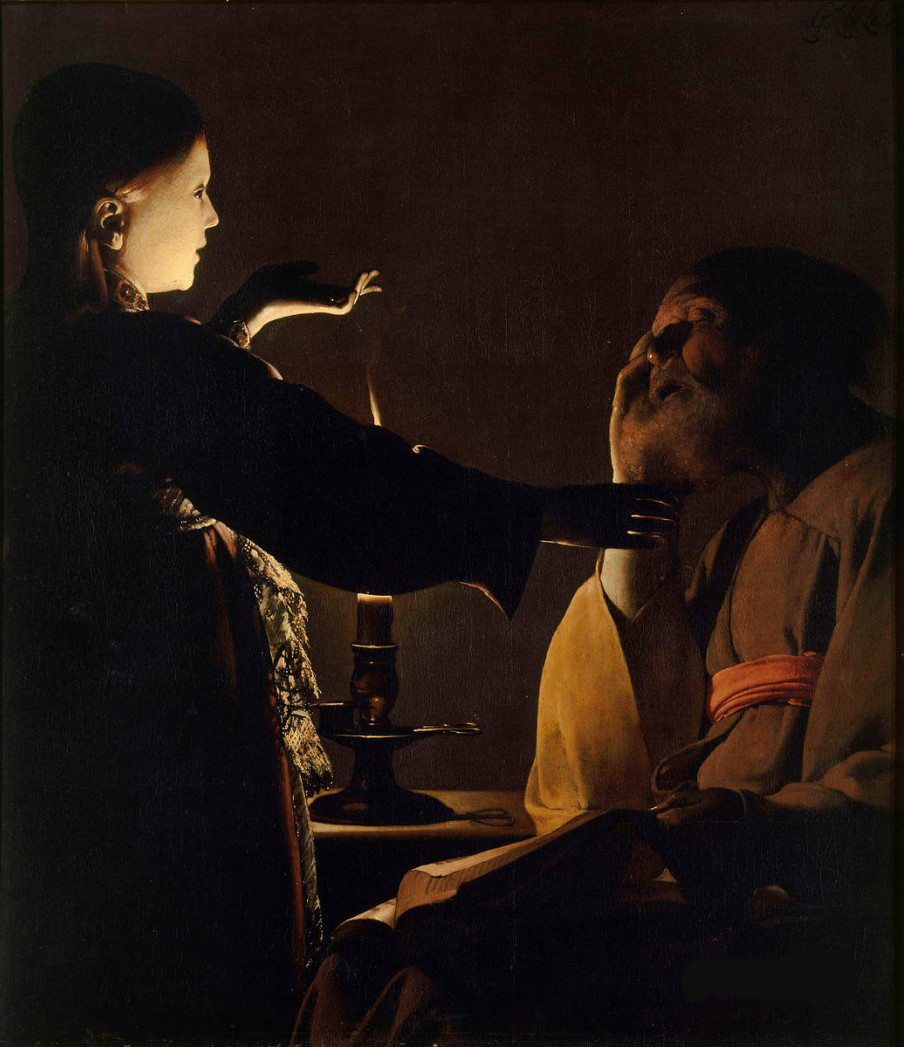
- Artist: Georges de La Tour
- Year: ca. 1628–1645
- Type: oil on canvas
- Dimensions: 93 cm × 81 cm (37 in × 32 in)
- Location: Musée d'Arts de Nantes, Nantes, France

The Dream of Saint Joseph is an oil-on-canvas painting created between 1628 and 1645 by the French Baroque painter Georges de La Tour which is now in the collection of the Musée d'Arts de Nantes.

The painting depicts Saint Joseph, the father of Jesus, being visited while dreaming by either an angel with a message or a young girl after falling asleep while reading a book. According to the New Testament he was actually visited four times with various messages and it is not clear in this case which visit is being portrayed. It is most likely to represent the second visit in which Joseph is advised to leave Bethlehem and seek sanctuary for the Holy Family in Egypt.

Typical of many of de La Tour's works, a chiaroscuro effect is achieved by lighting the scene with a candle.

== See also ==
- Saint Joseph's dreams
- 100 Great Paintings, 1980 BBC series
