= Joseph's Dream (studio of Rembrandt, 1650–1655) =

Painting by Barent Fabritius

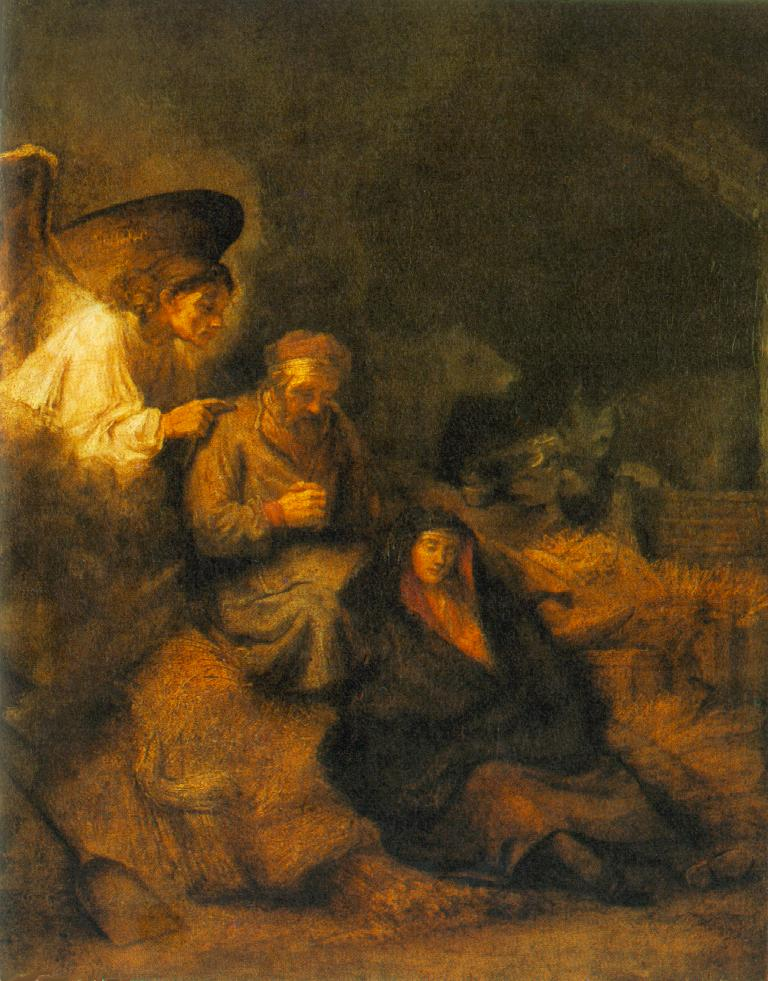
Joseph's Dream, circa 1650–1655

Joseph's Dream is a 1650–1655 oil on canvas painting by Barent Fabritius and other artists in Rembrandt's studio. It is now in the Museum of Fine Arts (Budapest), which purchased it in 1885 from Alois Hauser the Elder's collection in Munich. It had previously been auctioned in Amsterdam in 1755.

It shows Saint Joseph receiving the second of his dreams warning him of the Massacre of the Innocents (Matthew 2: 13-15). A pen sketch for the painting's composition by Rembrandt himself is now in the Kupferstichkabinett Berlin. The Rembrandt catalog raisonné of 1908 accepted the painting as an autograph work, but by the time of the catalog raisonné of 1935 it had been re-identified as a studio work, an identification also accepted by the Rembrandt Research Project.
