= Alois Hauser the Elder =

German painter

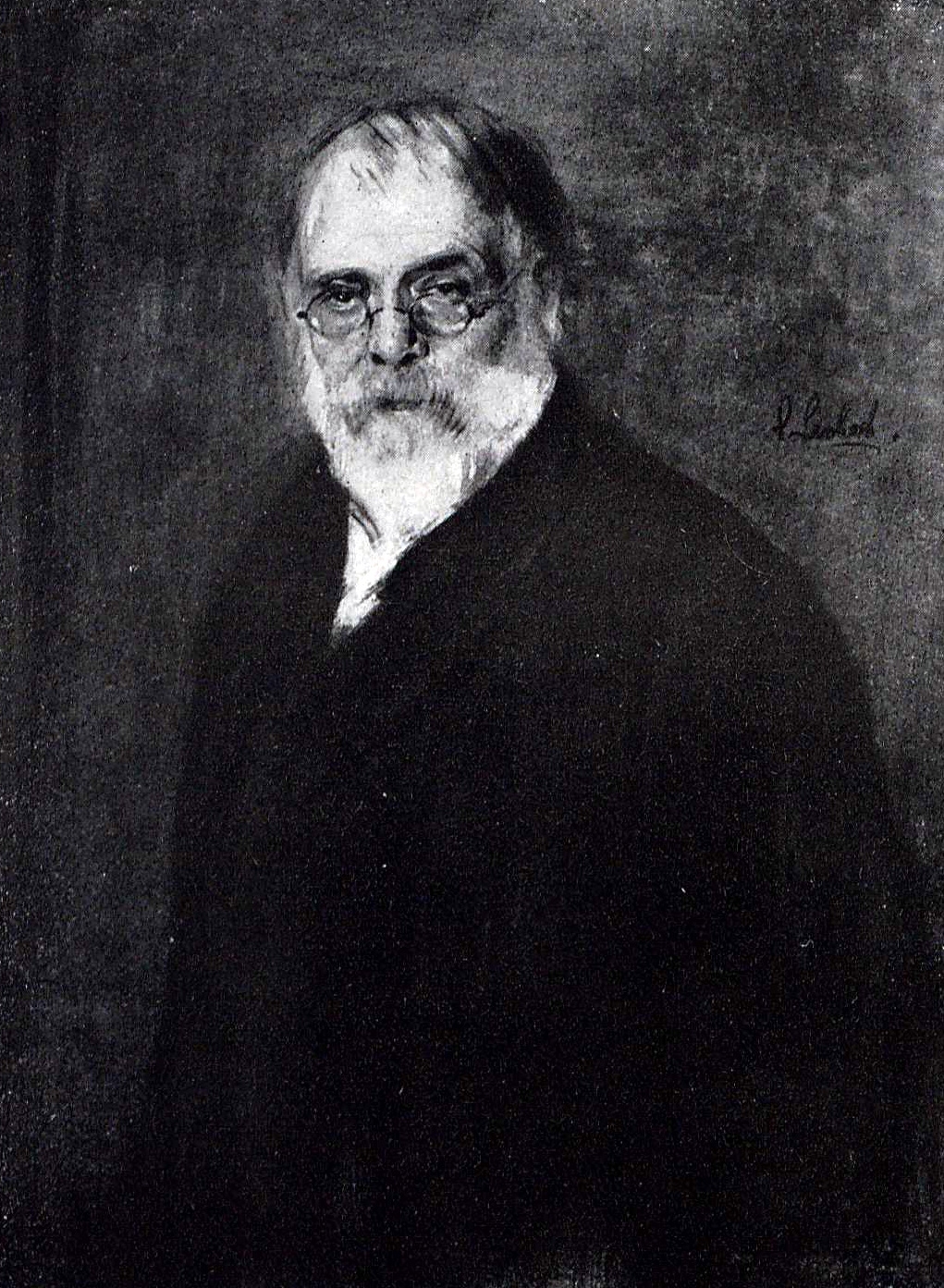
Franz von Lenbach, Portrait of Alois Hauser the Elder, 1900

Alois Hauser (17 February 1831 – 7 March 1909) was a German art restorer, court painter and curator.

== Life ==
He was born in Burladingen (then part of the small principality of Hohenzollern-Hechingen) in 1831 as a potter's son. Aged fourteen he studied under the decorative painter Kaspar Lieb (1803–1864) in Hettingen. Thanks to help from the businessman Anton Carry (1797–1860), who had been in charge of the art gallery in Hechingen since 1845, he then went to Augsburg between 1847 and 1854 to study under the painter and art-restorer Anton Deschler (1816–1881) and to attend the city's Kunstschule im Polytechnikum, which was based in the former Katharinenkloster, as was the new Staatsgalerie, founded in 1835.

Probably again through Carry's influence, Hauser met Constantine, who had been living in Silesian Löwenberg since ceding Hohenzollern-Hechingen to the Kingdom of Prussia after the German revolutions of 1848–49. Hauser took over from Carry as curator of Constantine's collection of paintings, which moved from Hechingen to Löwenberg in the early 1850s, and was officially made curator and court-painter in 1855. Hauser also continued to work as a painter on the open market via an art-dealer in Bamberg in Upper Franconia, who obtained much more lucrative commissions for him. This persuaded him to move to Bamberg in 1861, where in a few years he gained a good reputation as a restorer and work on public collections such as the German National Museum in Nuremberg, founded in 1852. He also carried out restoration for Bamberg's own Kunstinstitut from 1865 onwards as well as being appointed conservator of the city's paintings in 1869.

As a restorer he was part of a new generation which analysed historical painting techniques so as to assess how best to restore the paint surface, as described in his 1896 Anleitung zur Technik der Oelmalerei. His growing reputation in the field led him to move again in 1875, this time to Munich, where he took over the Alte Pinakothek's conservation department. In 1885 he was appointed its conservator and four years later a professor. There he worked on Durer's Paumgartner altarpiece, Rubens' The Great Last Judgement and van Dyck's Susanna and the Elders. In 1887 he also restored the Darmstadt Madonna, a campaign recognised with its own exhibition,

Trainees in his conservation studio in Munich went on to work at other major European museums, including his own son Alois Hauser the Younger (1857–1919), who became head restorer at the Gemäldegalerie (Berlin) in 1887, and Otto Vermehren, later Head of Conservation at the Uffizi in Florence. Hauser the Elder died in Munich in 1909 and was buried in Schwabing, with the funeral oration given by Franz von Reber, director of the Bayerischen Staatssammlungen, stating that Hauser was "not only the best, but the best in his field in his time".

== Bibliography (in German) ==
- Burger, Friedrich Richard: Offener Brief an Herrn Professor Alois Hauser, I. Konservator an der Alten Pinakothek zu München, Munich 1906 (Digital)
- Holland, Hyacinth: Hauser, Alois. In: Biographisches Jahrbuch und Deutscher Nekrolog 14 (1912), pp. 164–167 (Digital)
- Senn, Ernst: Zur Bildkunde Hohenzollern. Fr. von Lenbach: Professor Alois Hauser 1831–1909. In Hohenzollerische Jahreshefte 7 (1940), pp. 110–113
- Mandt, Petra: Alois Hauser d. J. (1857–1919) und sein Manuskript "Über die Restauration von Gemälden". In Zeitschrift für Kunsttechnologie und Konservierung 9 (1995), fascicule 2, pp. 215–231
