= Joachim Steyer =

German politician, member of State Parliament

Joachim Steyer (born 1966) is a German politician (AfD). He is member of the Landtag of Baden-Württemberg.

== Early life and education ==
Steyer was born on April 9, 1966 in Bremen. In 1991, he became a master gas and water fitter. Since 1992, he has worked as freelancer in installation of water and gas in private homes in Burladingen.

== Politics ==
In 2015, Steyer joined the AfD, and in 2018, he became spokesman for the AfD local branch in Burladingen. In 2019, he was elected as a municipal councilor for Burladingen. In 2021, he was also elected to the state parliament of Baden-Württemberg.

Steyer claims, among other things, that left-wing extremism is increasing in Baden-Württemberg. He speaks out in favor of anti-refugee policies and accuses the media of being one-sided.
