= Saint Joseph's dreams =

Biblical episodes

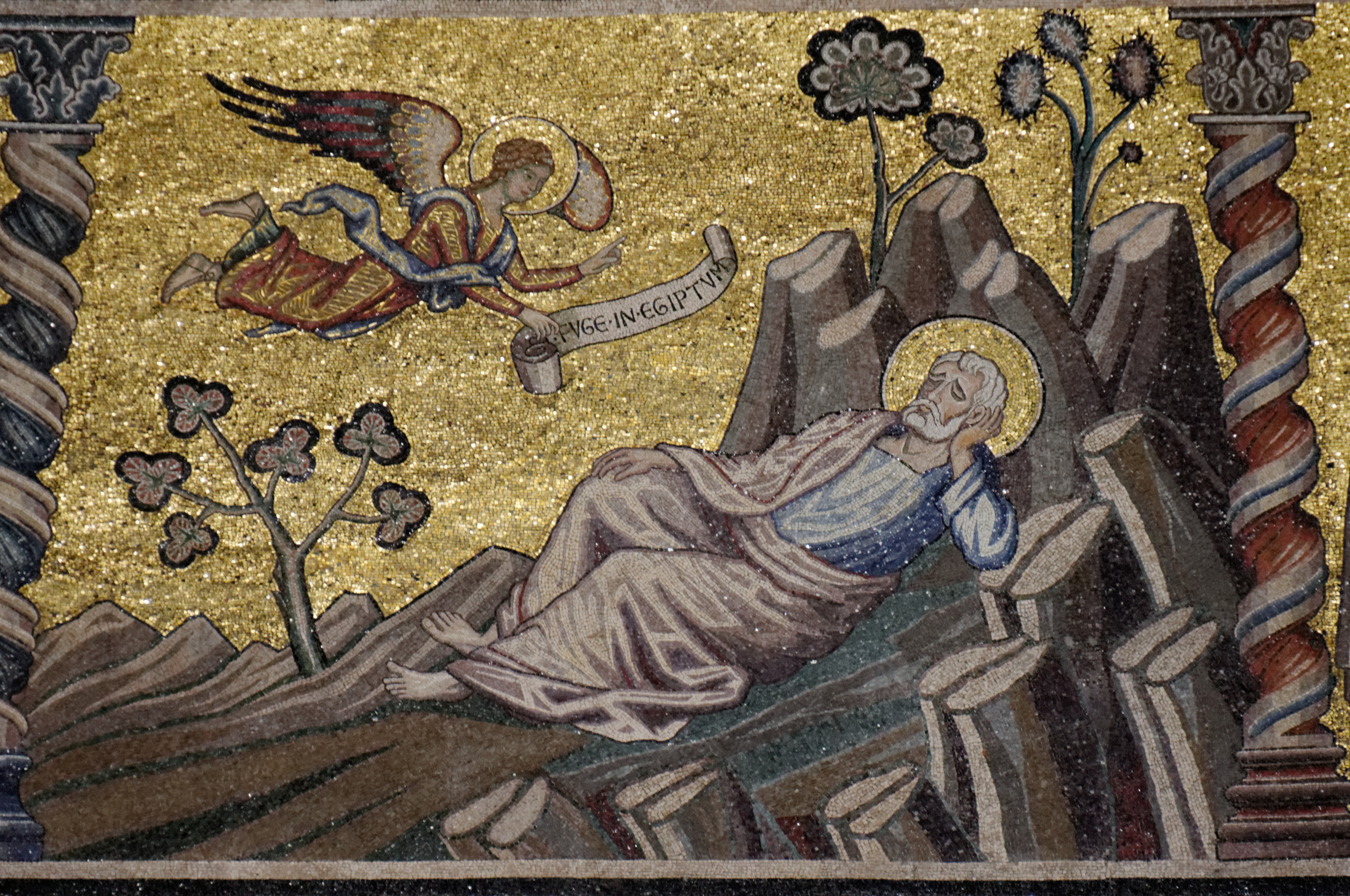
The second dream, as shown by the text on the angel's banderole: "Flee to Egypt", 13th-century mosaic, Florence Baptistry

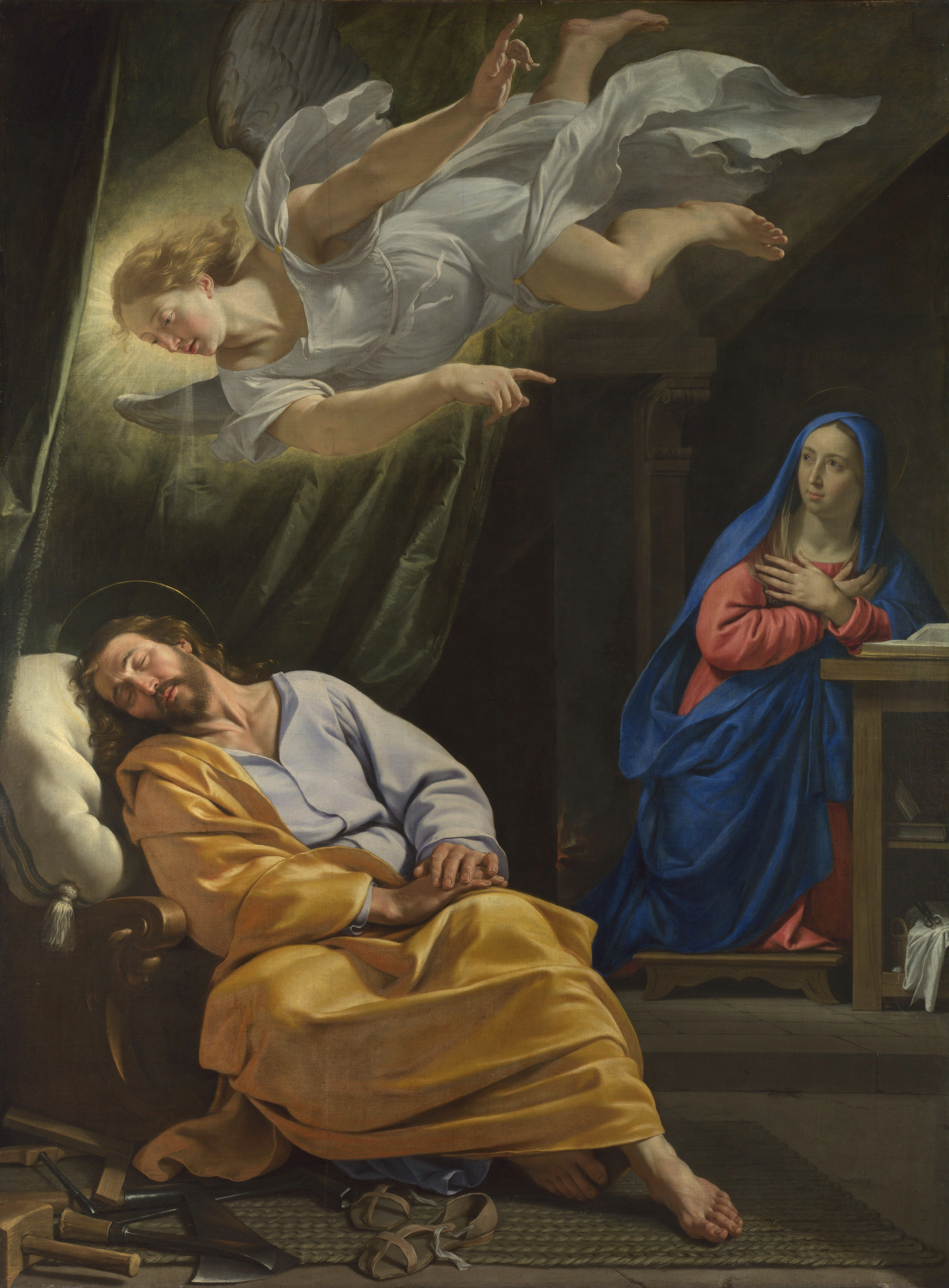
The Dream of Saint Joseph, by Philippe de Champaigne, 1642-43

Saint Joseph's dreams are four dreams described in the Gospel of Matthew in the New Testament in which Joseph, the legal father of Jesus, is visited by an angel of the Lord and receives specific instructions and warnings of impending danger. All four dreams come from the period around the Nativity of Jesus and his early life, between the onset of Mary's pregnancy and the family's return from the Flight into Egypt. They are often distinguished by numbers as "Joseph's first dream" and so on. Especially in art history, the first may be referred to as the Annunciation to Joseph.

== Biblical accounts ==
The four dreams are as follows:

- First dream: In Matthew 1:20–21, Joseph is told not to be afraid to take Mary as his wife, because she has conceived by the Holy Spirit. (See also the Annunciation in Luke 1:26–38, when an angel visits Mary and she agrees to conceive "through the power of the Most High".)
- Second dream: In Matthew 2:13, Joseph is warned to leave Bethlehem and flee to Egypt.
- Third dream: In Matthew 2:19–20, while in Egypt, Joseph is told that it is safe to go back to Israel.
- Fourth dream: In Matthew 2:22, because he had been warned in a dream, Joseph awakens to depart for the region of Galilee instead of going to Judea.

== Commentary ==
Roger Baxter, in his Meditations reflects on the second dream, writing: "Ponder the particulars of this command. 1. The angel commands in the name of God, who is the supreme Lord. 2. He delivers the command not to Mary, though she was the more worthy; but to Joseph, because he was the head of the family, and its ordinary superior. 3. He appeared to him in sleep, by which we learn, that even while we sleep the care of God is exerted over us, and He is continually watching for our good. 4. He tells him to take the Child and His mother, without mentioning anything else. Oh that Jesus and Mary were your only care! 5. He assigns them the place of their banishment. Learn, hence, not to choose for yourself, but receive everything in the ordinary way of God's providence, and as coming from His hands, in regard to place, employment, prosperity, and adversity."

== In art ==
The dreams have sometimes been depicted in art, though they have never been among the most common subjects from the Life of Jesus in art or the Life of the Virgin. It is often unclear which dream is intended. The second dream is probably most often depicted, and if there is no other indication it can be assumed that is the subject. If the Virgin Mary is present (but no infant Jesus), especially if visibly pregnant or shown spinning, this suggests the first dream, which tends to be shown in an indoor setting. An outside setting may suggest the second dream, as does the angel pointing outside the picture space, urging Joseph to leave. The tools of his carpentry workshop are often shown around him, probably indicating the second dream, although logically there seems to be no reason why these should not be present for the first and third dreams as well. The presence of the ox or ass from the Nativity scene suggests the second dream. In the absence of a place in a sequence, inscribed text, a title, or decor showing a setting in Egypt, the third and fourth dreams can generally be ruled out where there is uncertainty.

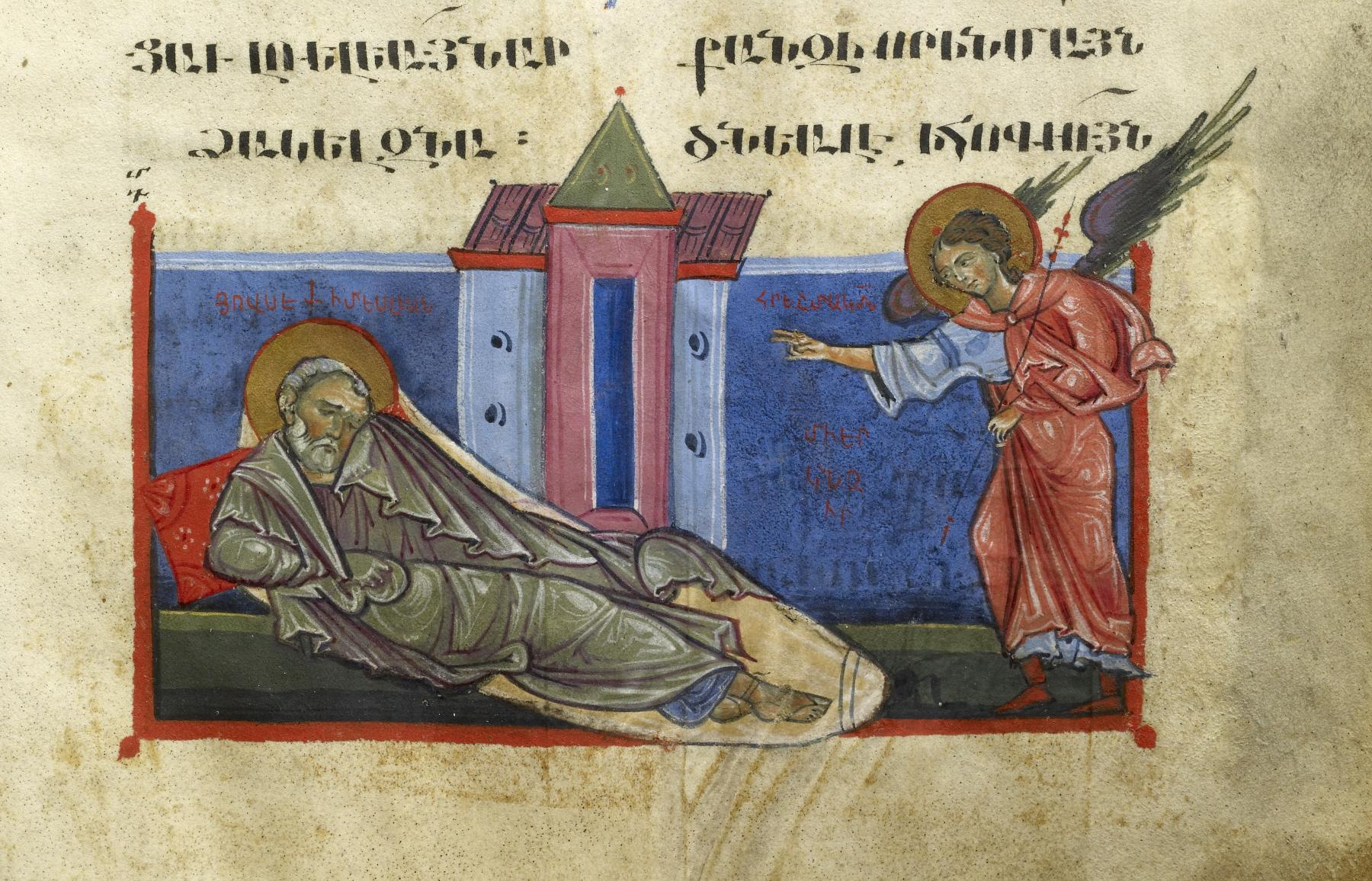
Toros Roslin, 1262

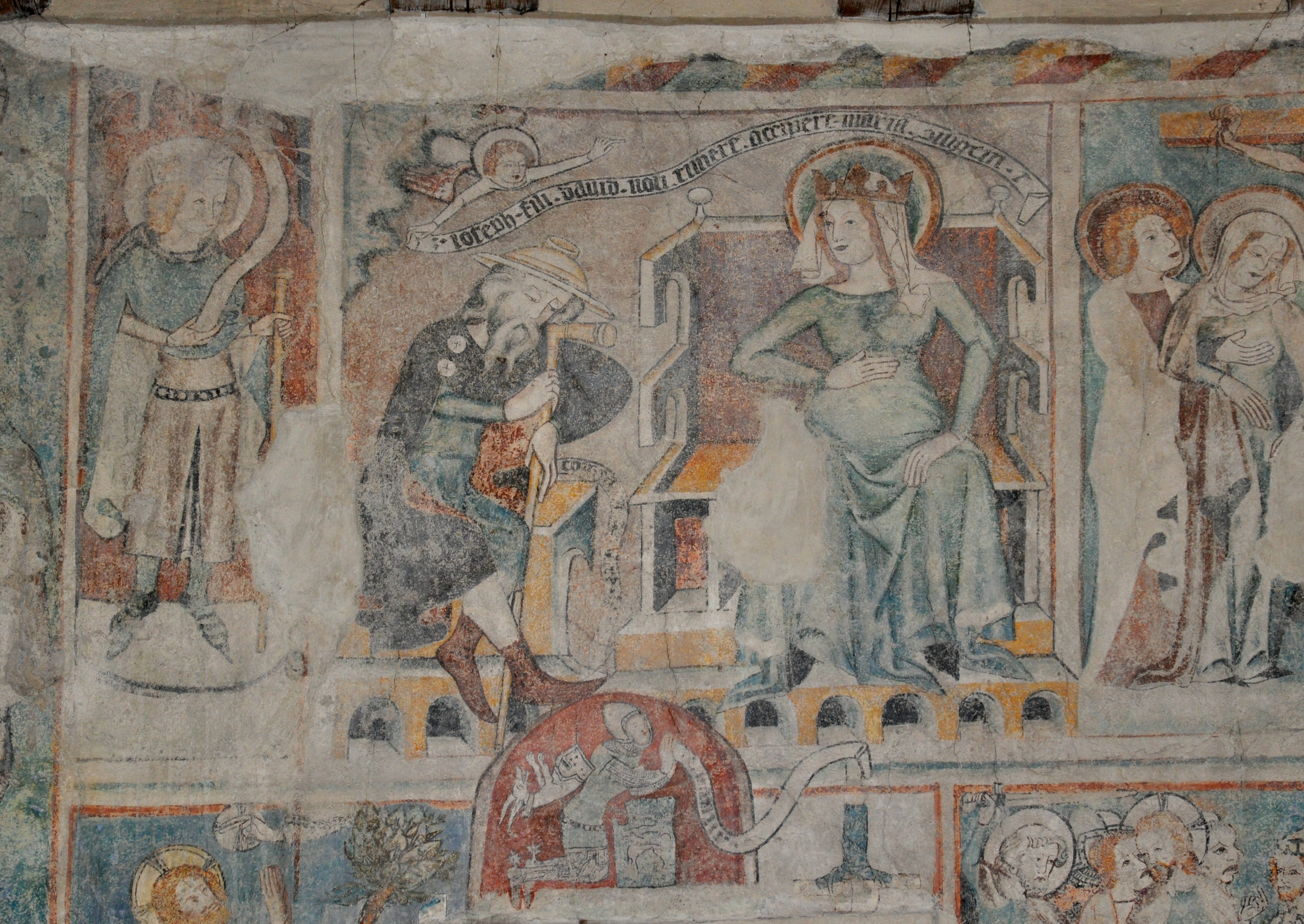
The first dream, as shown by the angel's banderole, fresco, 1360

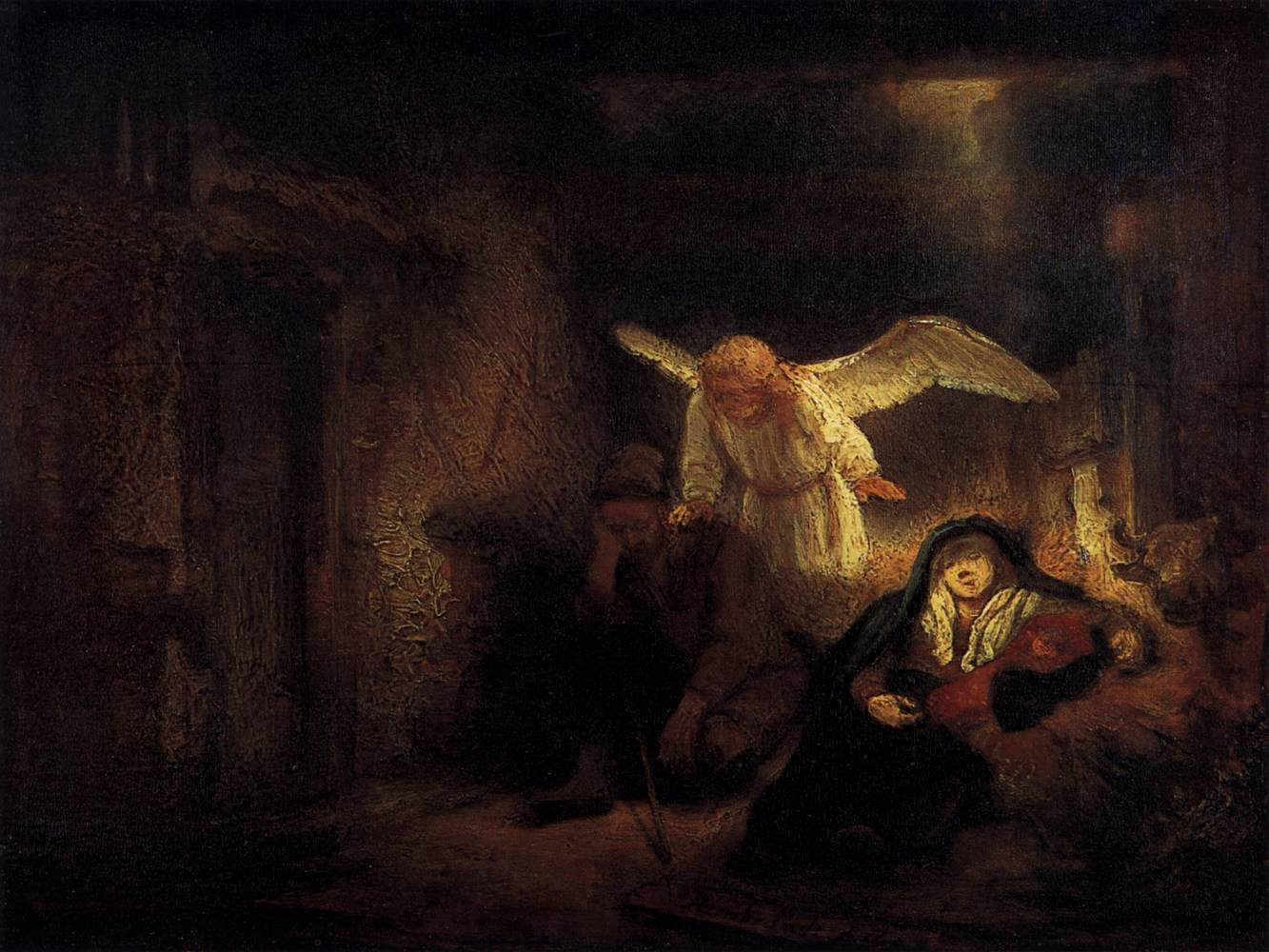
Second dream, Rembrandt and workshop, 1645, with ox

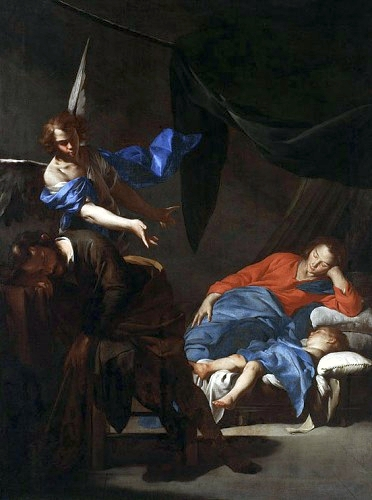
Bernardo Cavallino, c. 1645. Given the size of Jesus, and the basic accommodation, this might be the 3rd dream.

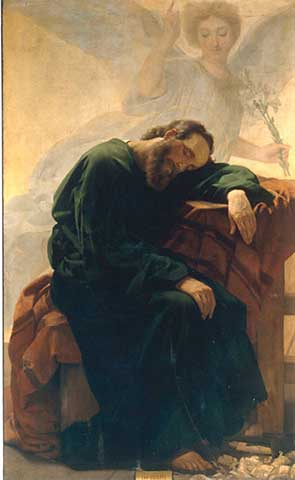
Antonio Ciseri, 19th century, probably the 1st dream.

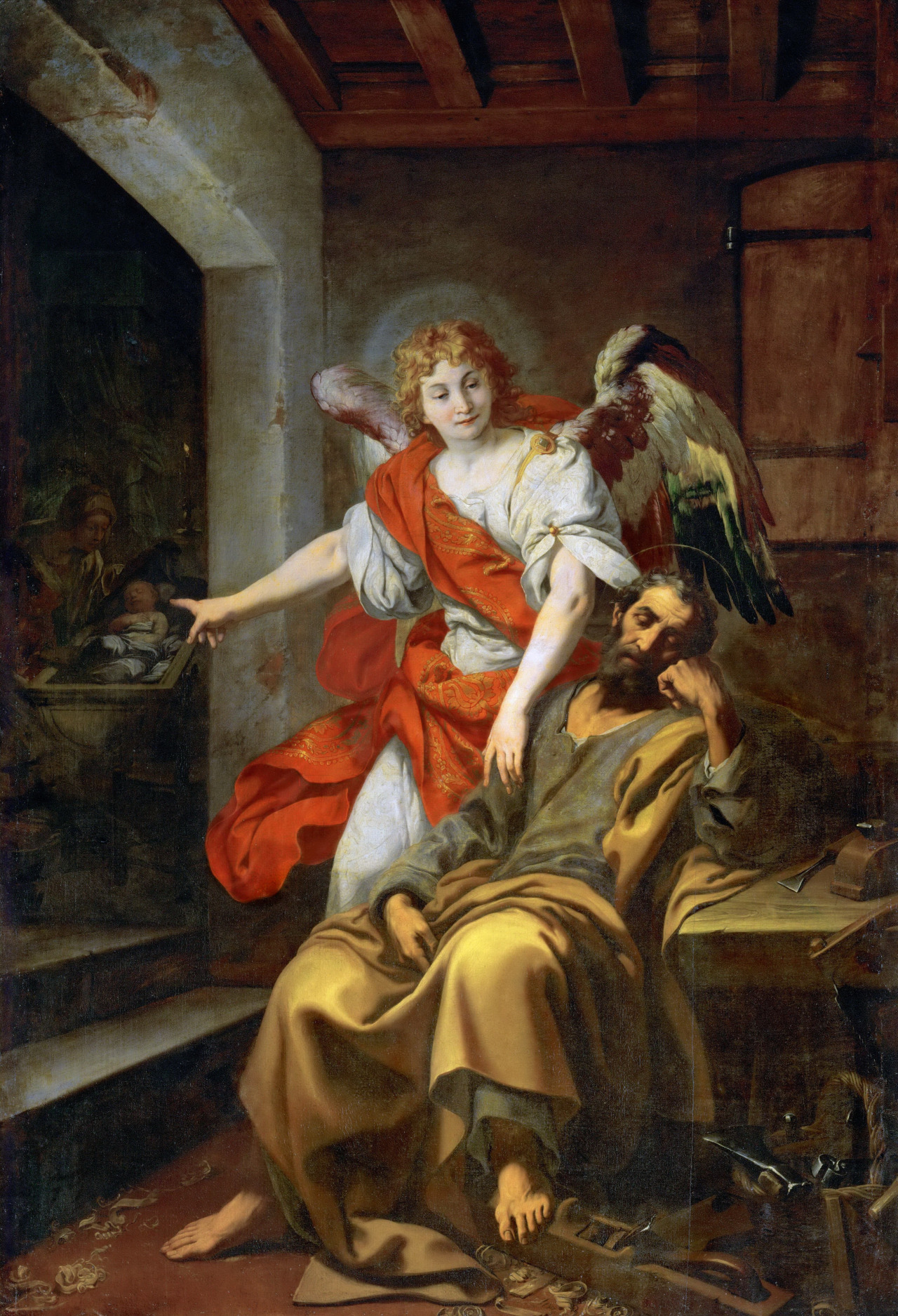
The 2nd dream, by Daniele Crespi, 1620–1630. Back in the Nazareth workshop, but Jesus in the room to the left seems still a baby.

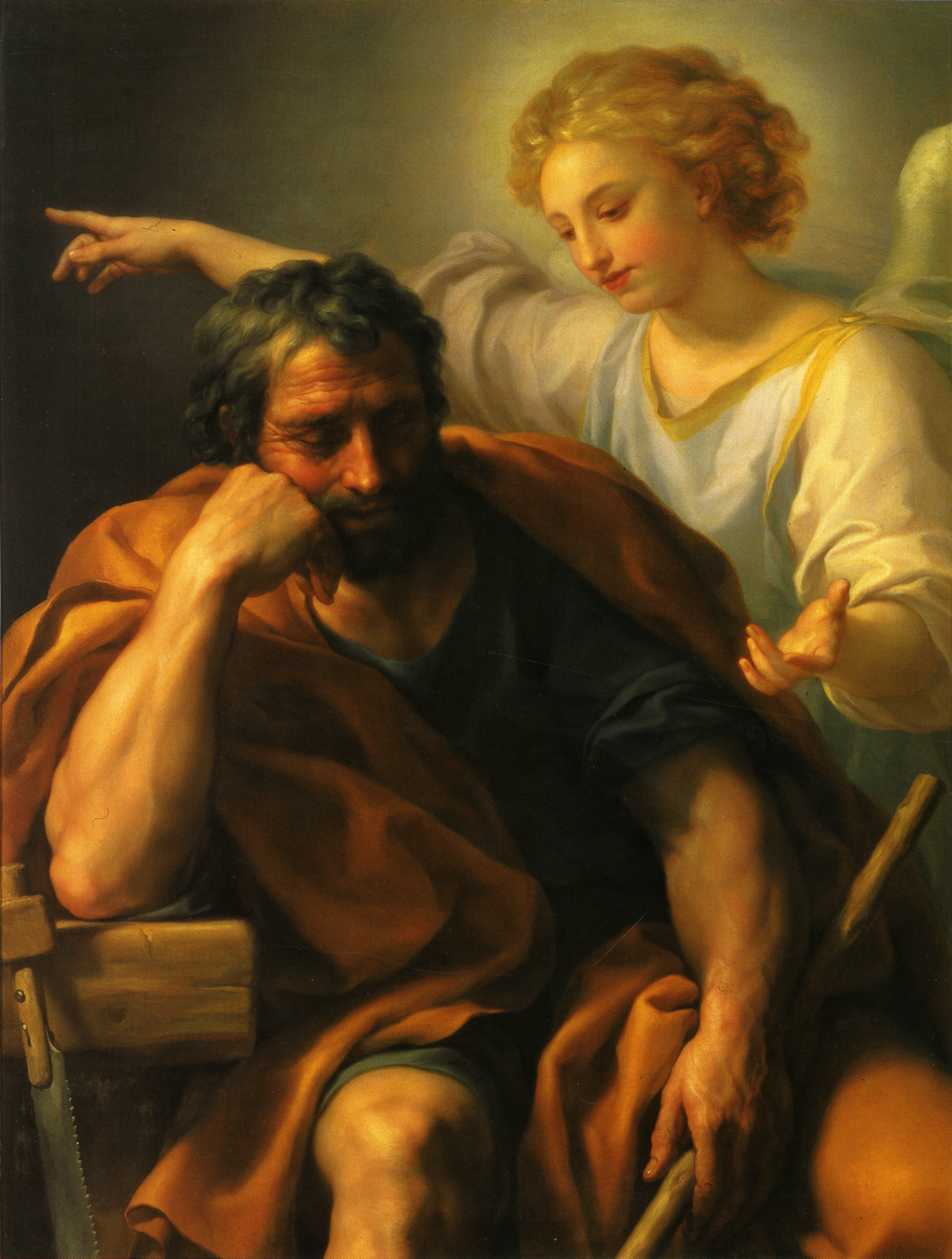
Mengs 18th century

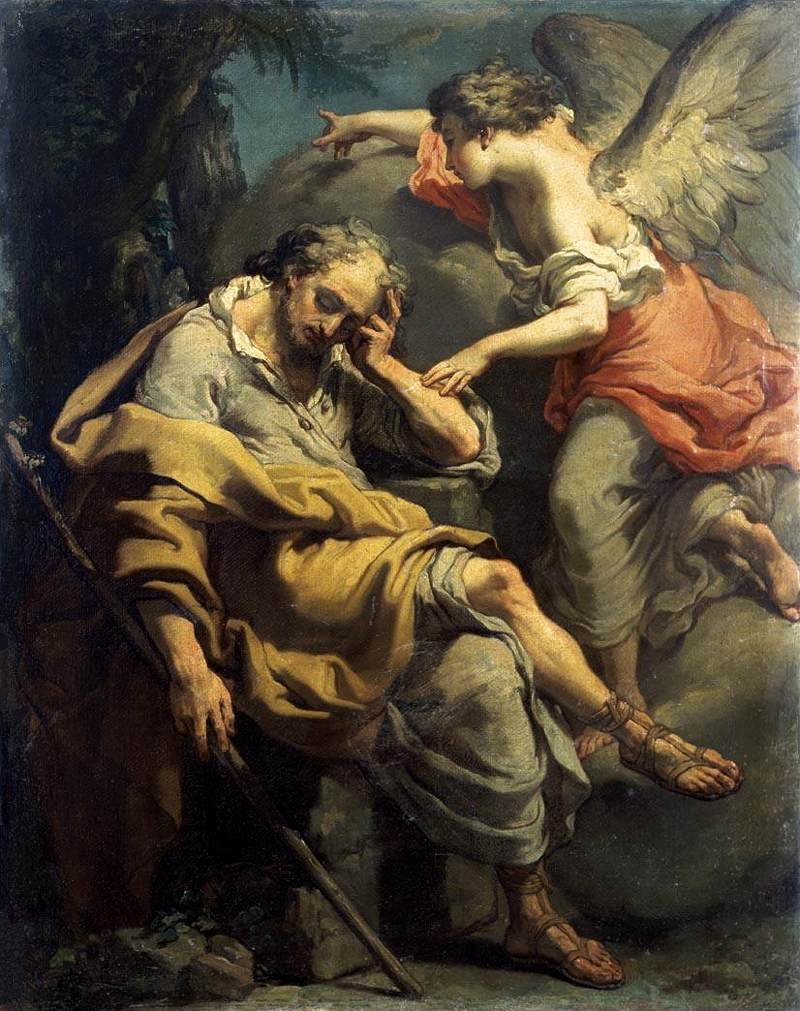
Gaetano Gandolfi, c. 1790

=== Depictions with articles ===
- Joseph's Dream (Crespi), 1620s, 2nd dream
- Joseph's Dream (Rembrandt, 1645)
- Joseph's Dream (studio of Rembrandt, 1650–1655)
- Dream of Saint Joseph, (de La Tour, 1628–1645)

=== Sleeping Joseph statues ===
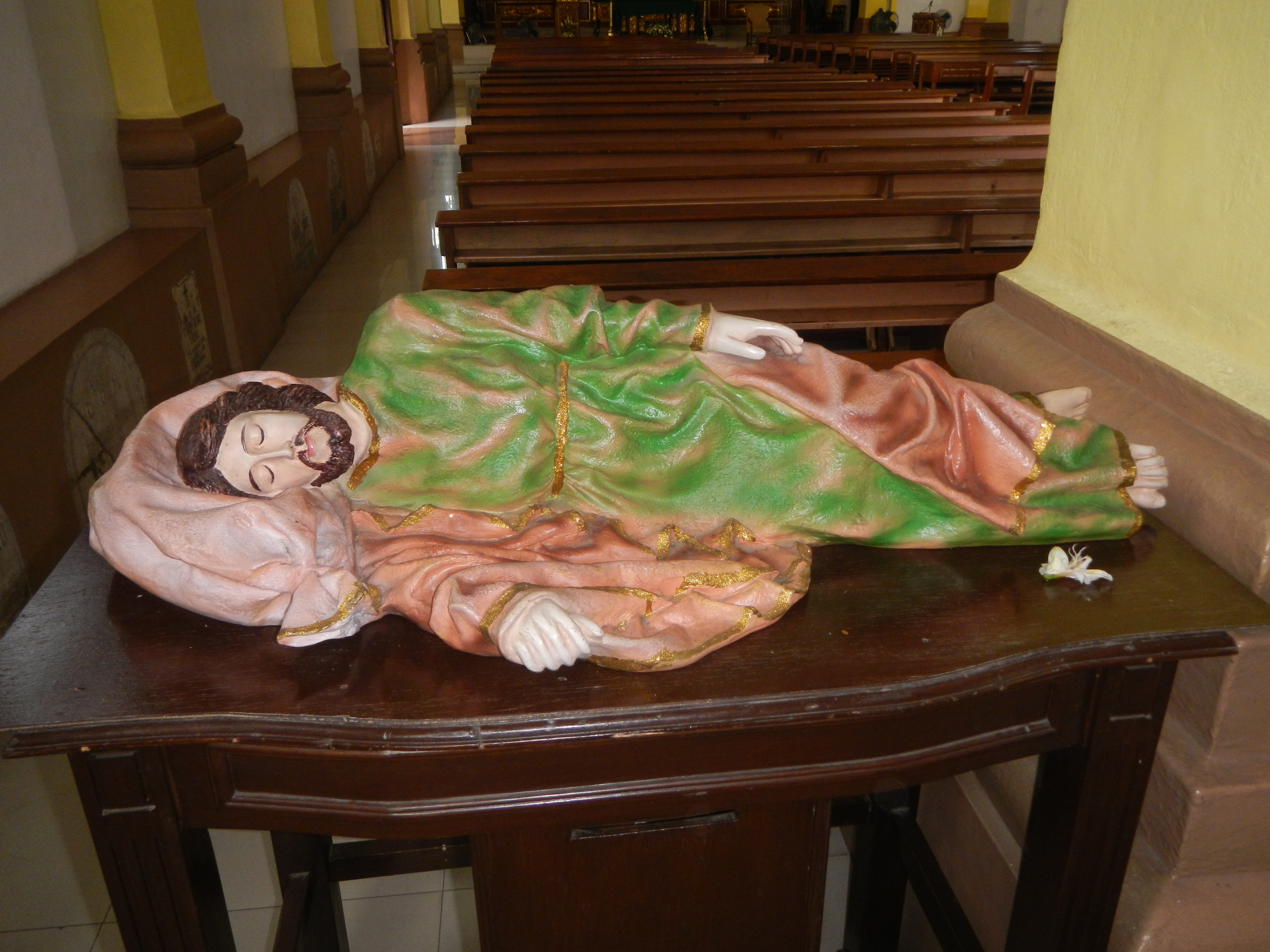
Sleeping Joseph in San Miguel Church, Manila

A statue of the "Sleeping Joseph" is a devotional object found in some Catholic homes. It was popularised by Pope Francis, who said during a 2015 visit to the Philippines, "when I have a problem, a difficulty, I write a piece of paper and put it under St. Joseph, because he dreams about it! This gesture means: pray for this problem!"

== See also ==
- Chapel of the Milk Grotto
- Nativity of Jesus
