= Farrenberg =

Mountain in Baden-Württemberg, Germany

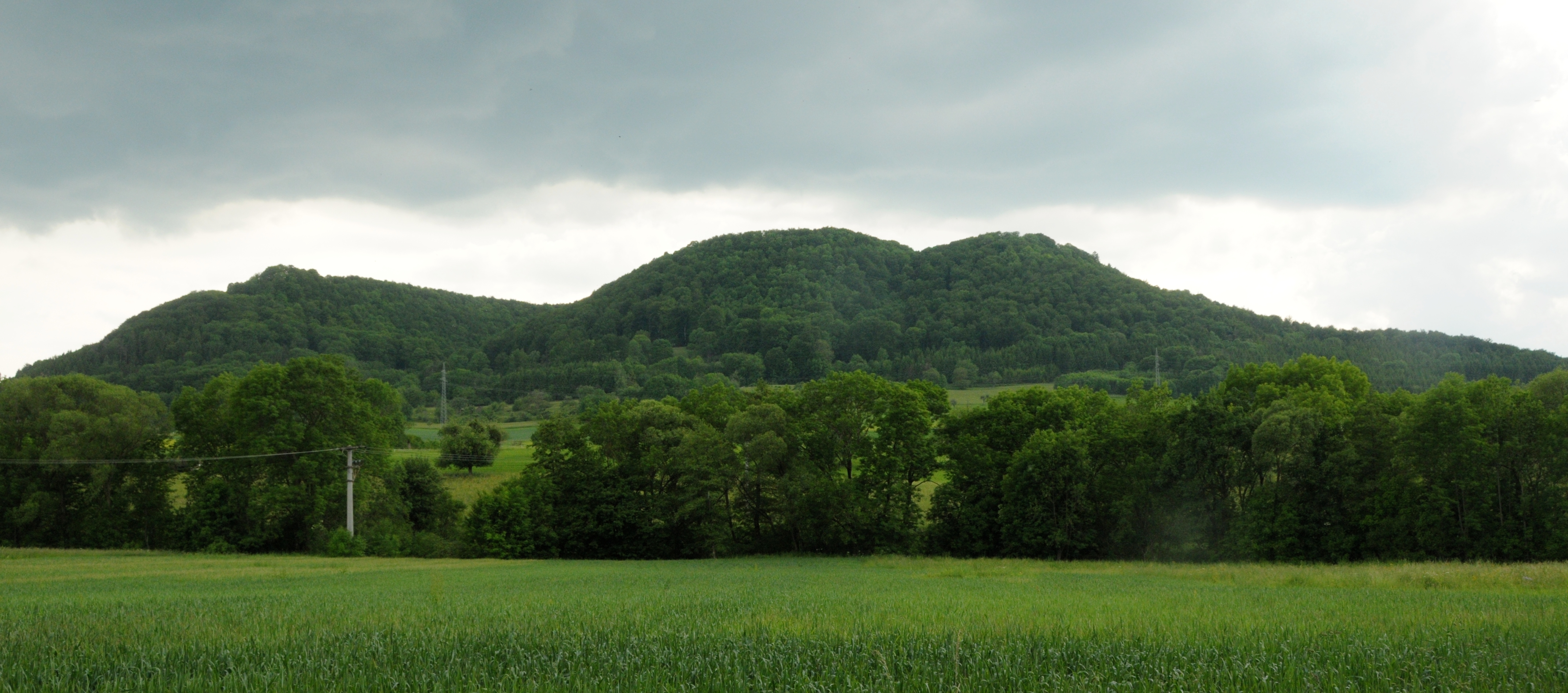

Highest point
- Elevation: 820 m (2,690 ft)
- Coordinates: 48°23′21″N 9°4′15″E

Geography
- Location: Baden-Württemberg, Germany

Farrenberg is a mountain of Baden-Württemberg, Germany.

== History ==
Bronze Age finds at Farrenberg attest to a fortified hilltop settlement dating from the Urnfield period (10th/9th century BC), which was most likely inhabited until the Hallstatt period (8th-5th century BC).

== Gallery ==
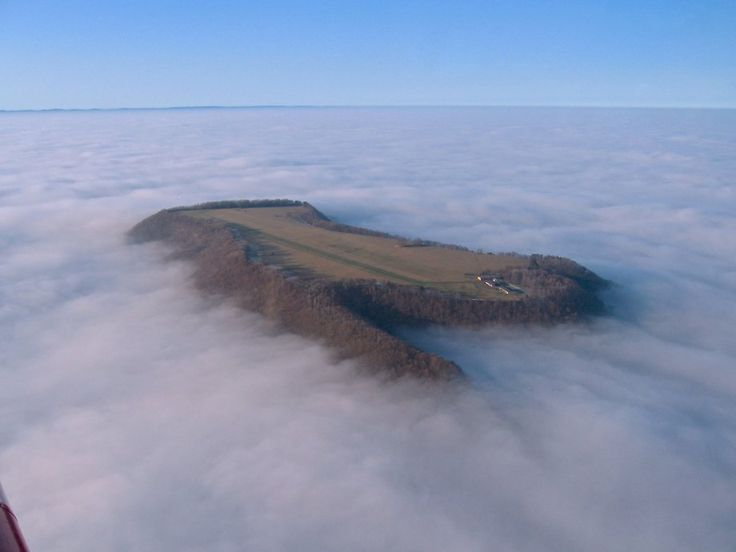

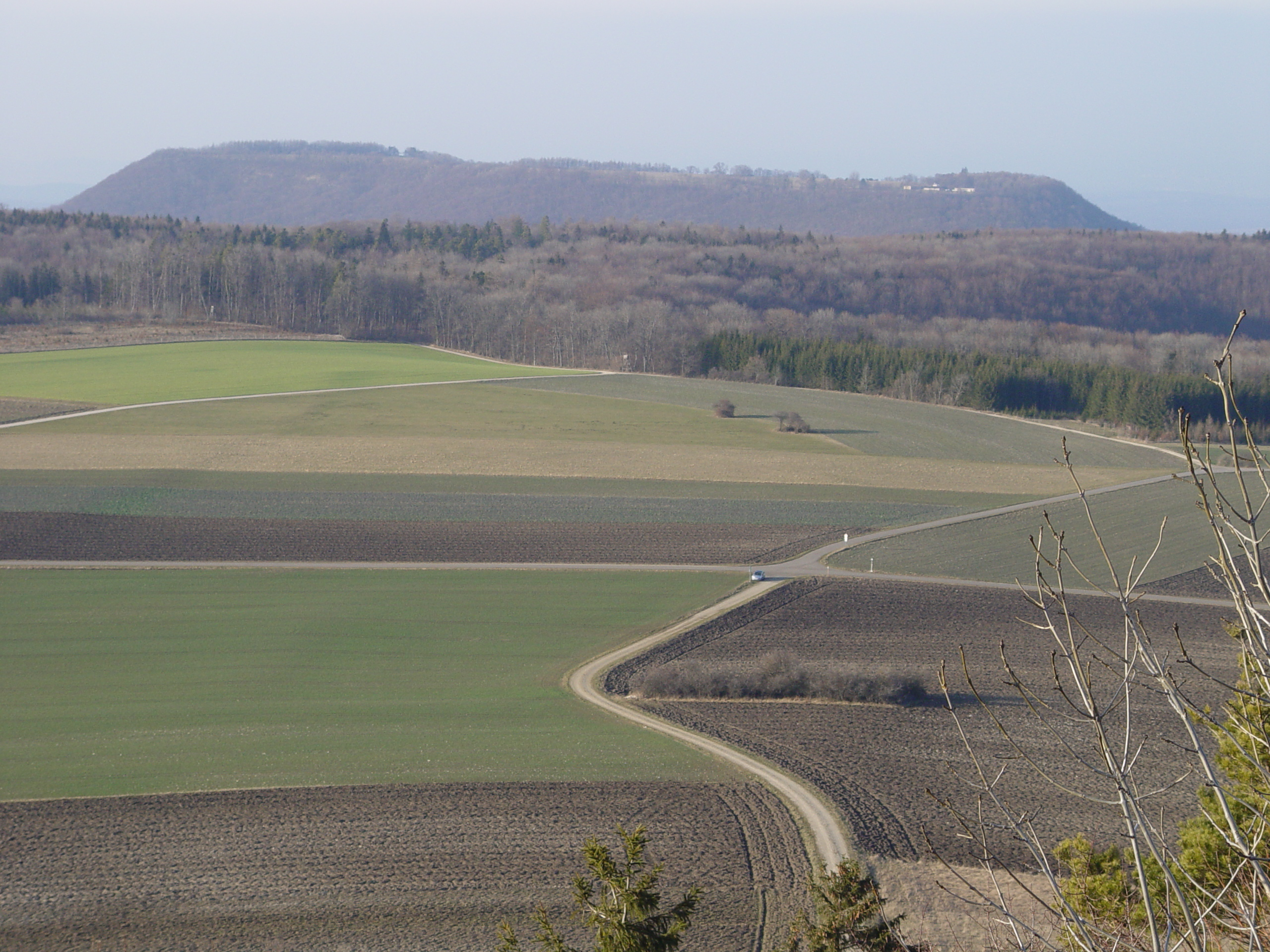
