= Burladingen =

German town

- Town
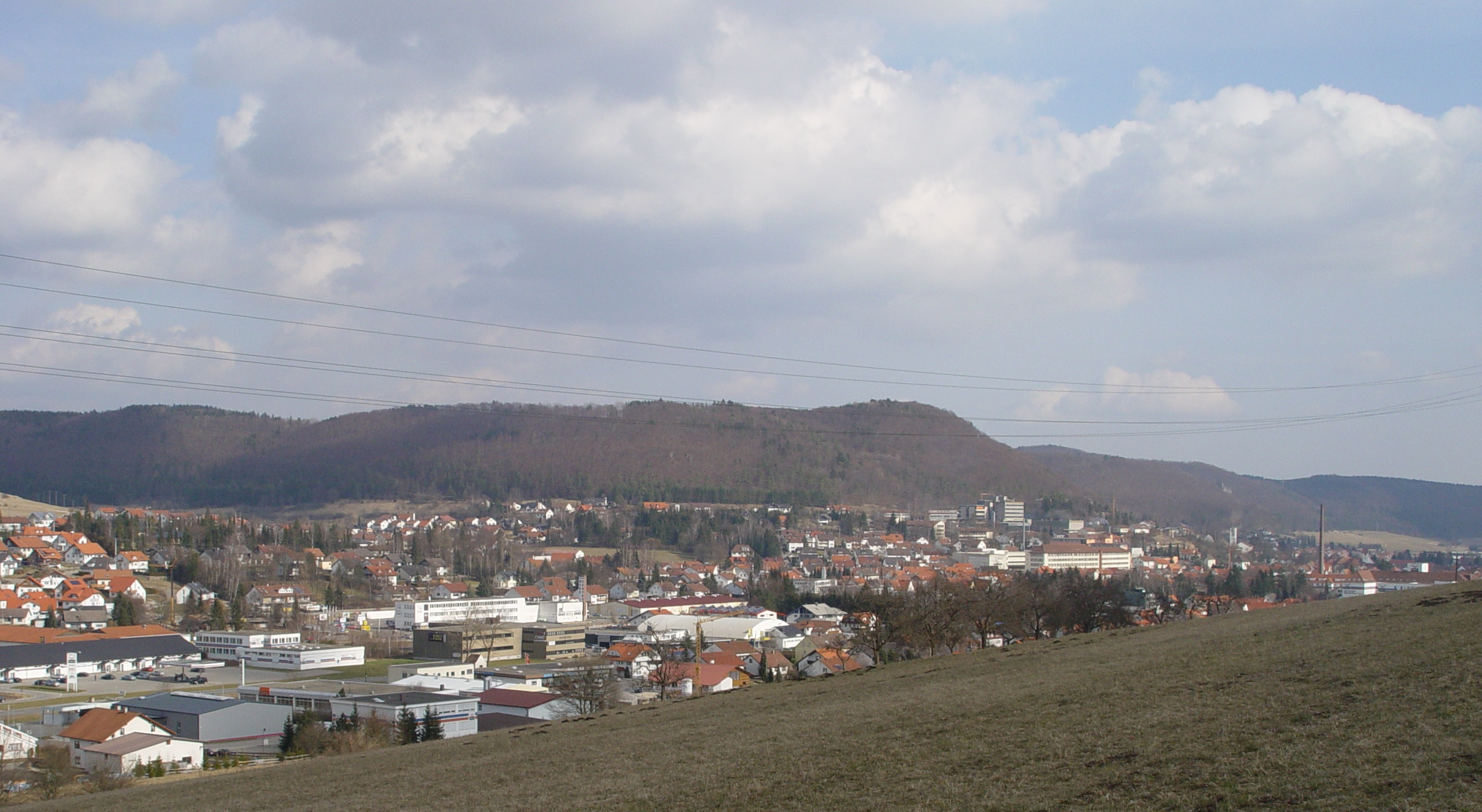
- Panorama of Burladingen

- Coat of arms

- Location of Burladingen within Zollernalbkreis district
- Interactive map of Burladingen
- Location within Germany Location within Baden-Württemberg
- Coordinates: 48°17′25″N 09°06′34″E
- Country: Germany
- State: Baden-Württemberg
- Admin. region: Tübingen
- District: Zollernalbkreis

Area
  - Total: 123.31 km^{2} (47.61 sq mi)
- Elevation: 722 m (2,369 ft)

Population (2025-12-31)
  - Total: 12,025
  - Density: 97.518/km^{2} (252.57/sq mi)
- Time zone: UTC+01:00 (CET)
  - Summer (DST): UTC+02:00 (CEST)
- Postal codes: 72386–72393
- Dialling codes: 07475
- Vehicle registration: BL, HCH
- Website: www.burladingen.de

Burladingen (German pronunciation: [ˈbʊʁladɪŋən]) is a town in the Zollernalbkreis district of Baden-Württemberg, Germany.

== History ==
In 1849, Burladingen and the villages of Hörschwag and Gauselfingen came under the dominion of the Kingdom of Prussia. They were assigned in 1850 to Oberamt Hechingen, one of the administrative districts of Province of Hohenzollern. The Oberamt was dissolved in 1925 the three towns were joined in the new Landkreis Hechingen by Melchingen, Ringingen, and Salmendingen, former possessions of the Kingdom of Württemberg ceded to Prussia in 1807. In 1973, as part of the 1973 Baden-Württemberg district reform, Hechingen's district was merged into the Zollernalb district. Hörschwag, was assigned to Reutlingen's district on 1 January 1973, but on 30 June 1974 was merged into Burladingen with the other townships. Burladingen was made an independent municipality in July 1978.

=== 2008 flood ===
In the evening of 2 June 2008, three women drowned in the Starzel, near Burladingen, following heavy rainfalls and flooding across south-western Baden-Württemberg.

=== 2023 anti refugee campaign ===
Around 600 people live in Killer, a part of Burladingen which became known nationwide in 2023. The district planned to accommodate 40 refugees in an empty pub there. At an information meeting, District Administrator Günther-Martin Pauli (CDU) was booed and an aggressive mood was expressed, fueled by the AfD member of the state parliament Joachim Steyer who was present.

== Geography ==
The township (Stadt) of Burladingen is located in the Swabian Jura, specifically where the Middle Kuppenalb transitions into the western Jura. Elevation above sea level in the municipal area varies from a low of 611 meters (2,005 ft) Normalnull (NN) to a high of 933 meters (3,061 ft).

The Federally-protected Bei der Mühle, Kornbühl, Nähberg, Oberberg-Köpfle, Scharlenbachtal-Hofwald, and Wacholderbusch nature reserves are located in Burladingen's municipal area.

== Coat of arms ==
Burladingen's coat of arms displays two silver keys, faced outward and away from each other, crossed over a black field. The pattern is derived from a 1702 seal, though the keys faced towards each other. This seal ceased to be used in the 19th century but was returned to official use around 1930, with the present pattern. Burladingen had a seal as early as 1534, making it the oldest in the County of Zollern, but it vanished from usage by 1541. The township was given the right to use a seal again in 1710 after an appeal to the Prince of Hohenzollern-Hechingen in 1702. The 1930 pattern was approved as the municipal coat of arms, with Zollern's black-white tincture, by the Federal Ministry of the Interior on 1 June 1956.

== Deportation ==
Burladingen-Ziegelhütte:

- Josef Reinhardt ( 1913) – 15.03.1943)
- Agnes Zulie (* 1942 – 15.03.1943)
- Elisabeth Regina Zulie (* 1920 – 15.03.1943)
- Elise Zulie ( 1922 – 15.03.1943)
- Adalbert Goldenstein (1922 – 1943)
- Hildegard Zulie (1943 – 15.03.1943)
- Olga Zulie ( 1940 – 15.03.1943)
