= Joseph's Dream (Crespi) =

Painting by Daniele Crespi

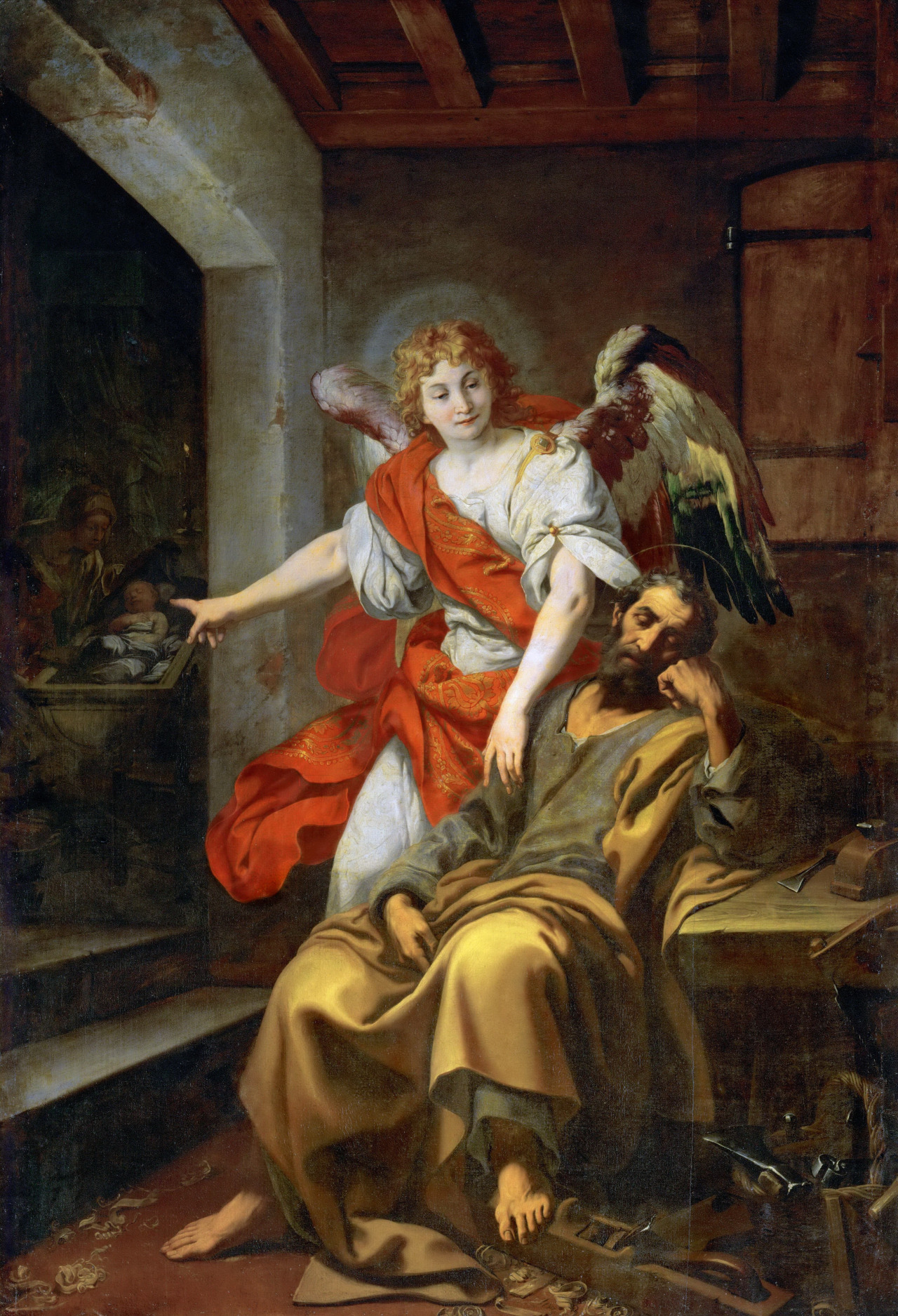
- Artist: Daniele Crespi
- Year: 1620-1630
- Medium: Oil on canvas
- Dimensions: 297 cm × 203 cm (117 in × 80 in)
- Location: Kunsthistorisches Museum, Vienna

Joseph's Dream is a 1620s painting by Daniele Crespi, now in the Kunsthistorisches Museum in Vienna. It shows an angel appearing to Joseph of Nazareth in his sleep to warn him of Herod the Great's intent to kill Jesus and to instruct him to flee into Egypt (Matthew 2:13). The subject depicts the second of Saint Joseph's four dreams as noted in the Gospel of Matthew.

== See also ==
- Joseph's Dream (Rembrandt, 1645)
