= Irrenberg =

Coordinates: 48°17′N 8°57′E

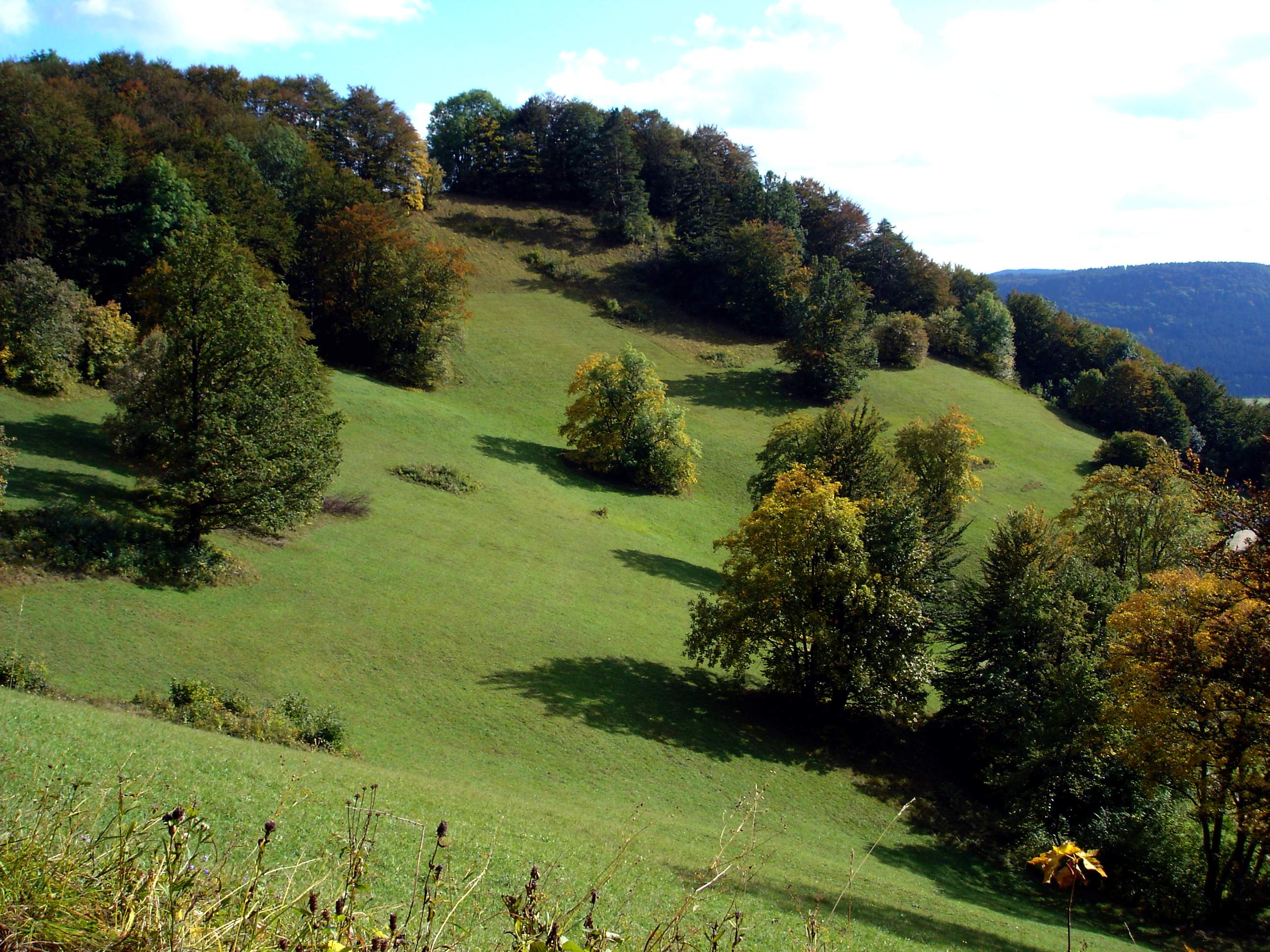
- Wood meadows on the Irrenberg

Highest point
- Elevation: 921 m (3,022 ft)

Geography
- Location: Zollernalbkreis, Baden-Württemberg, Germany

Irrenberg is a mountain of Baden-Württemberg, Germany. It is located in Zollernalbkreis.
