= Joseph's Dream (Rembrandt, 1645) =

Painting by Rembrandt

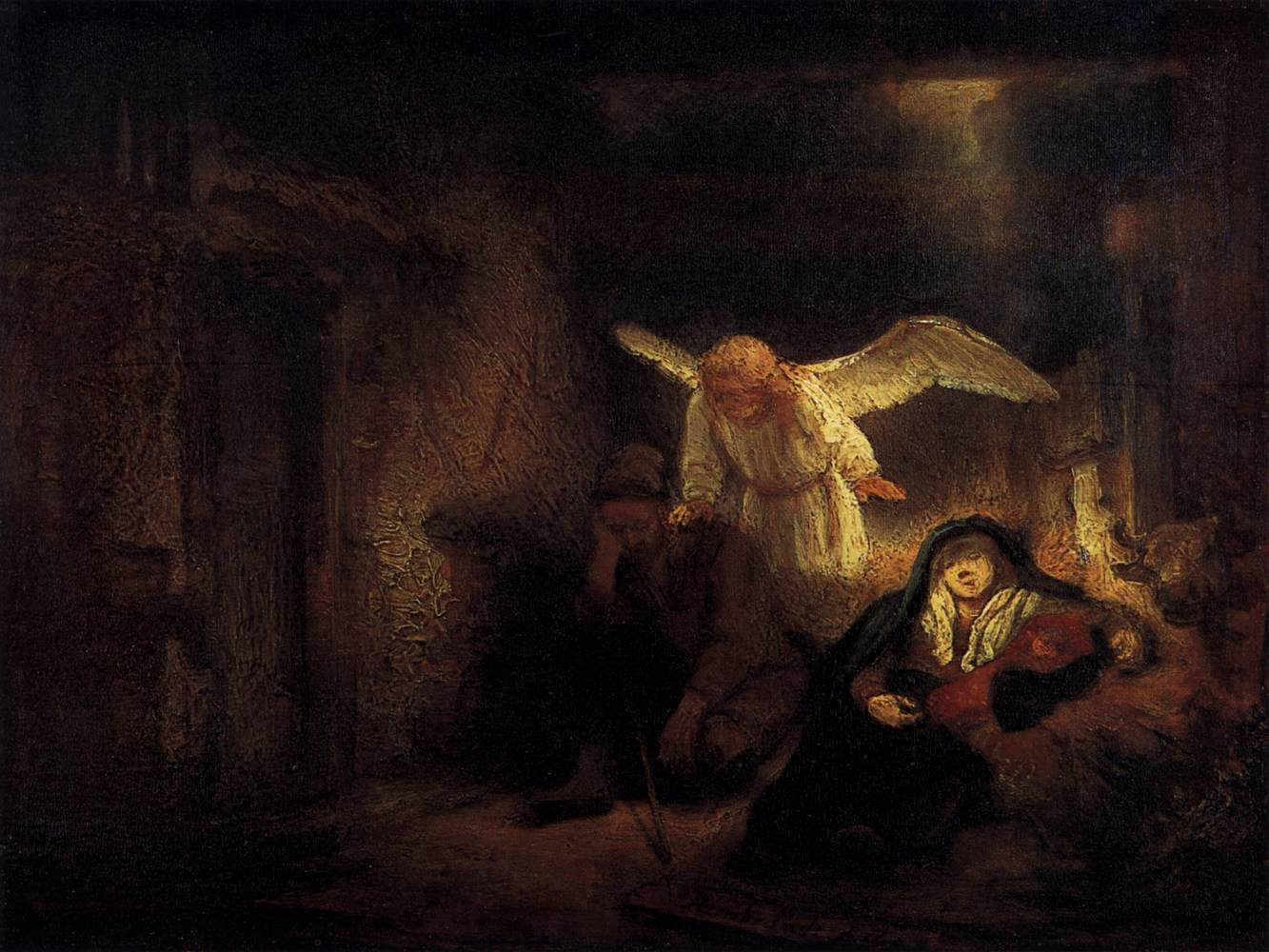
- Artist: Rembrandt
- Year: 1645
- Medium: Oil on canvas
- Dimensions: 20.7 cm × 27.8 cm (8.1 in × 10.9 in)
- Location: Gemäldegalerie; Berlin

Joseph's Dream is a 1645 oil-on-canvas painting by Rembrandt. It was in the Königliche Schlöss in Berlin until 1830, when it moved to the city's Königliche Museum. It is now in the Gemaldegalerie, Berlin. It portrays Saint Joseph receiving the second of his dreams, warning him of the Massacre of the Innocents (Matthew 2: 13–15).

== See also ==
- Joseph's Dream (Crespi), c. 1620s painting
- List of paintings by Rembrandt
