= Kornbühl =

Mountain in Baden-Württemberg, Germany

Coordinates: 48°21′N 9°06′E

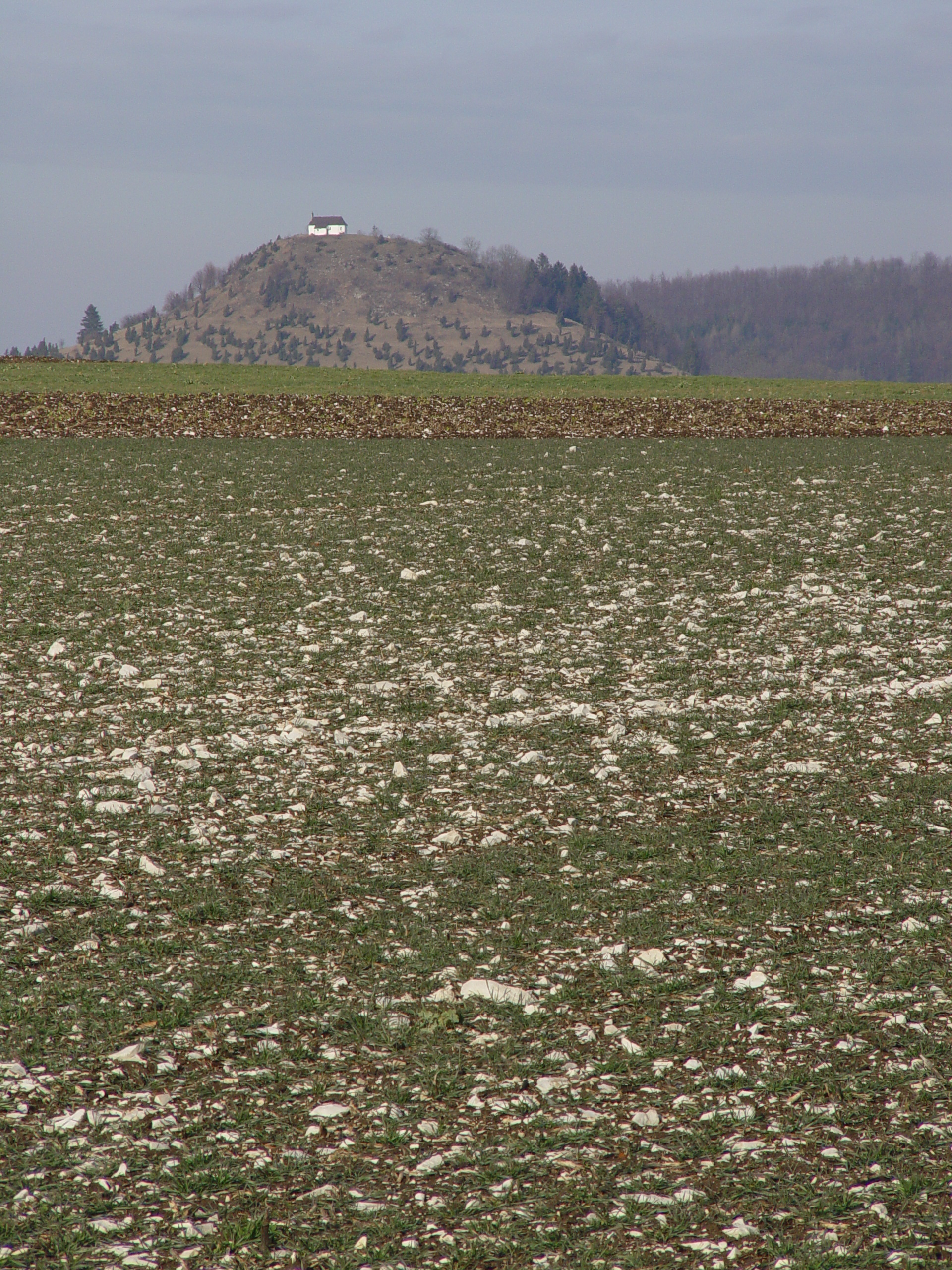
- Kornbühl from south

Highest point
- Elevation: 886 m (2,907 ft)

Geography
- Location: Burladingen, Zollernalbkreis, Baden-Württemberg, Germany

Kornbühl is a mountain of Baden-Württemberg, Germany. It belongs to the Swabian Jura and is located in Zollernalbkreis near Burladingen. On its top the "Salmendinger Kapelle" is located.
