= Heiligenkopf =

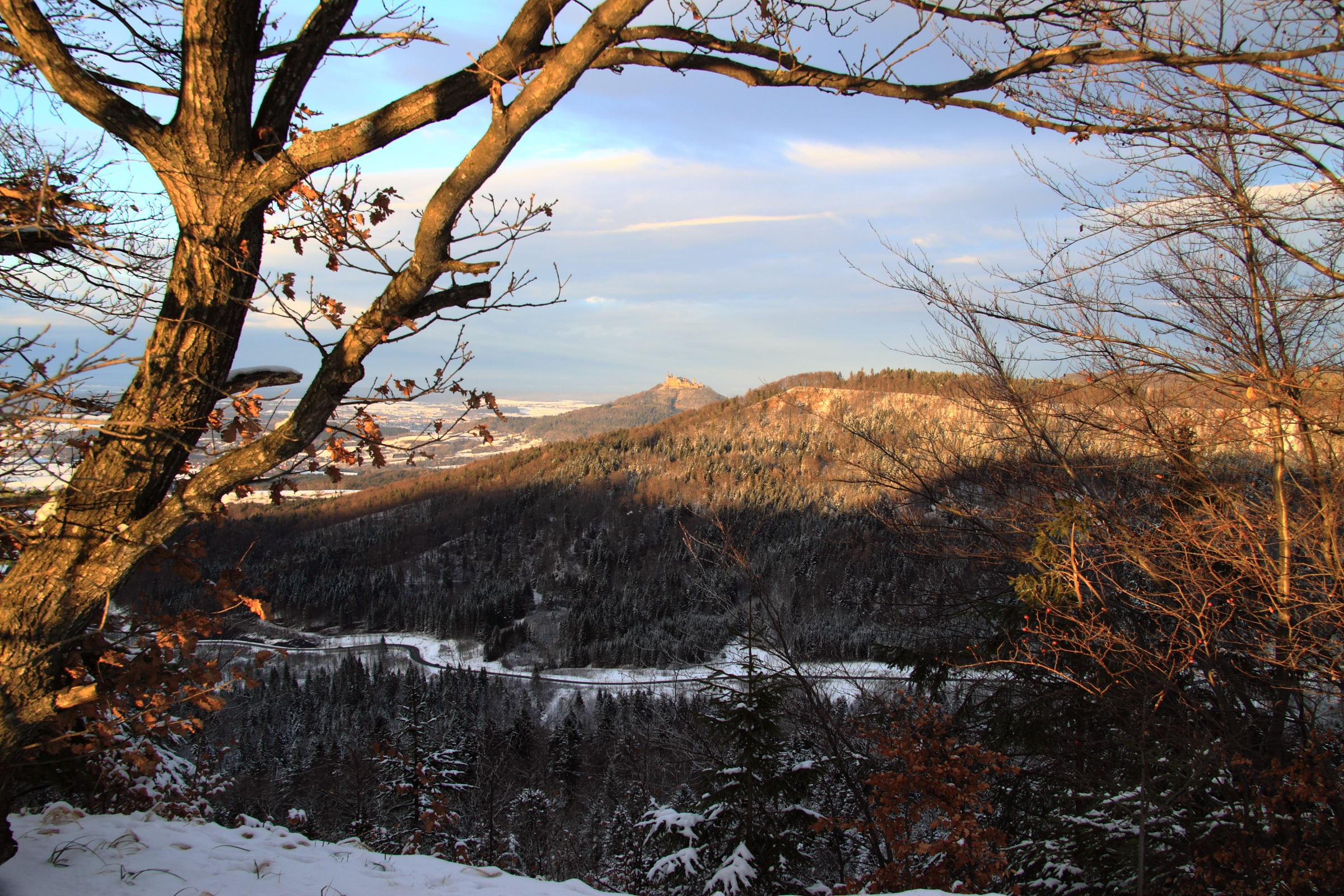
- Heiligenkopf with Hohenzollern castle

Highest point
- Elevation: 893 m (2,930 ft)
- Coordinates: 48°17′56″N 8°57′43″E

Geography
- Location: Zollernalbkreis, Baden-Württemberg, Germany

Heiligenkopf is a mountain of Baden-Württemberg, Germany. It is located in Zollernalbkreis, Germany.
