= Böllat =

Coordinates: 48°14′N 8°56′E

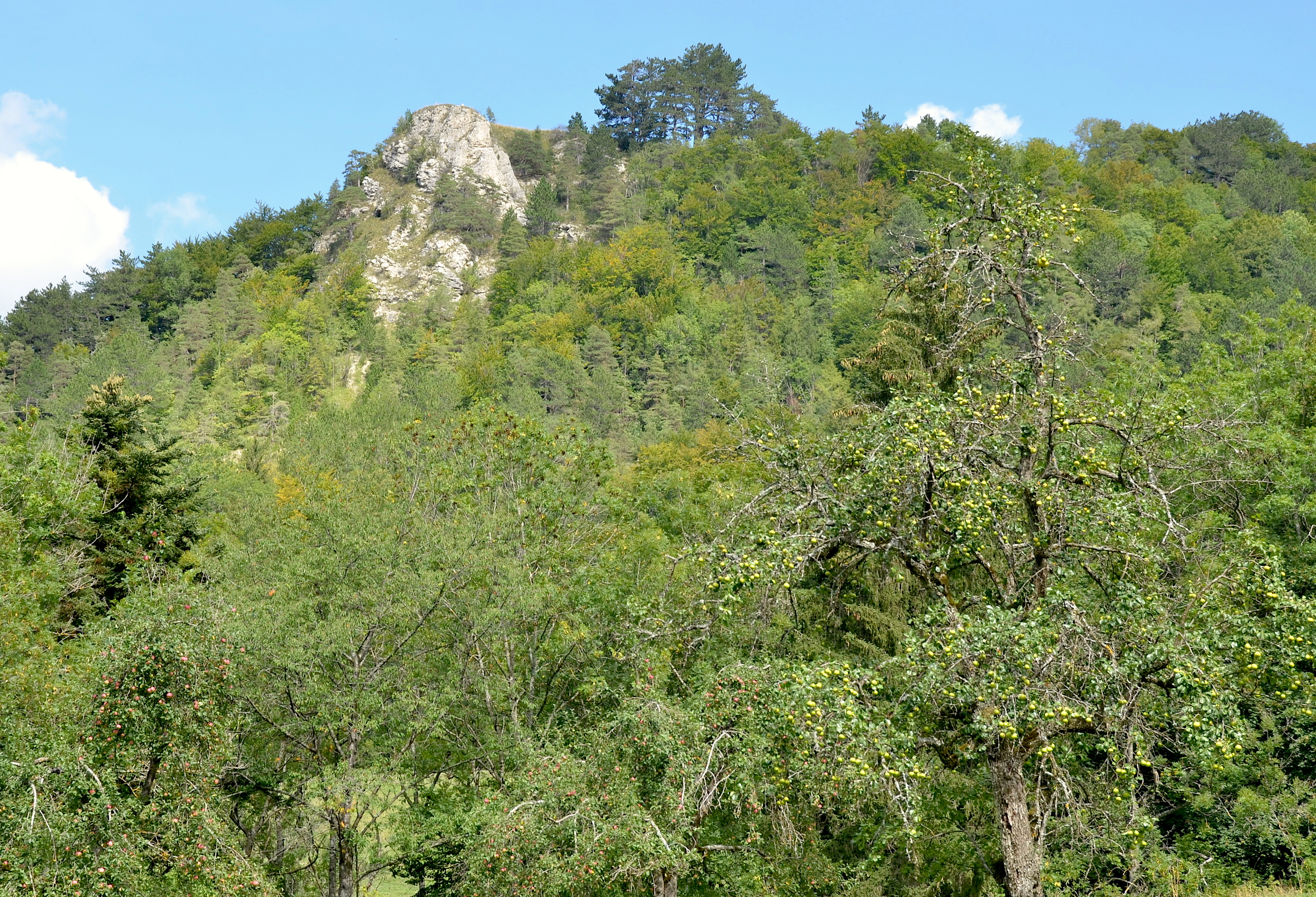
- Scenic viewpoint Böllat

Geography
- Location: Albstadt, Zollernalbkreis, Baden-Württemberg, Germany
- Parent range: Swabian Jura

Böllat is a mountain of Baden-Württemberg, Germany. It is located near Burgfelden, which belongs to Albstadt in Zollernalbkreis
