= Hüttenbach =

Hüttenbach may refer to:

== Places ==
- Hüttenbach (Grafengehaig), borough of the municipality Grafengehaig in the district of Kulmbach in Bavaria in Germany
- Hüttenbach (Simmelsdorf), borough of the Simmelsdorf in the district of Nürnberger Land in Bavaria in Germany

== Waters ==
- Hüttenbach (Altmühl), left tributary of the Altmühl in the district of Eichstätt in Bavaria in Germany
- Hüttenbach (Haselbach), left tributary of the Haselbach at Sulzbach an der Murr in the district of Rems-Murr in Baden-Württemberg in Germany
- Hüttenbach (Pegnitz), left tributary of the Pegnitz in the district Nürnberger Land in Bavaria in Germany
- Hüttenbach (Schafbach), tributary of the Wiesensee in the district Westerwaldkreis, Rhineland-Palatinate in Germany
