= Murrhardt Forest =

Natural region in Germany

Murrhard Forest
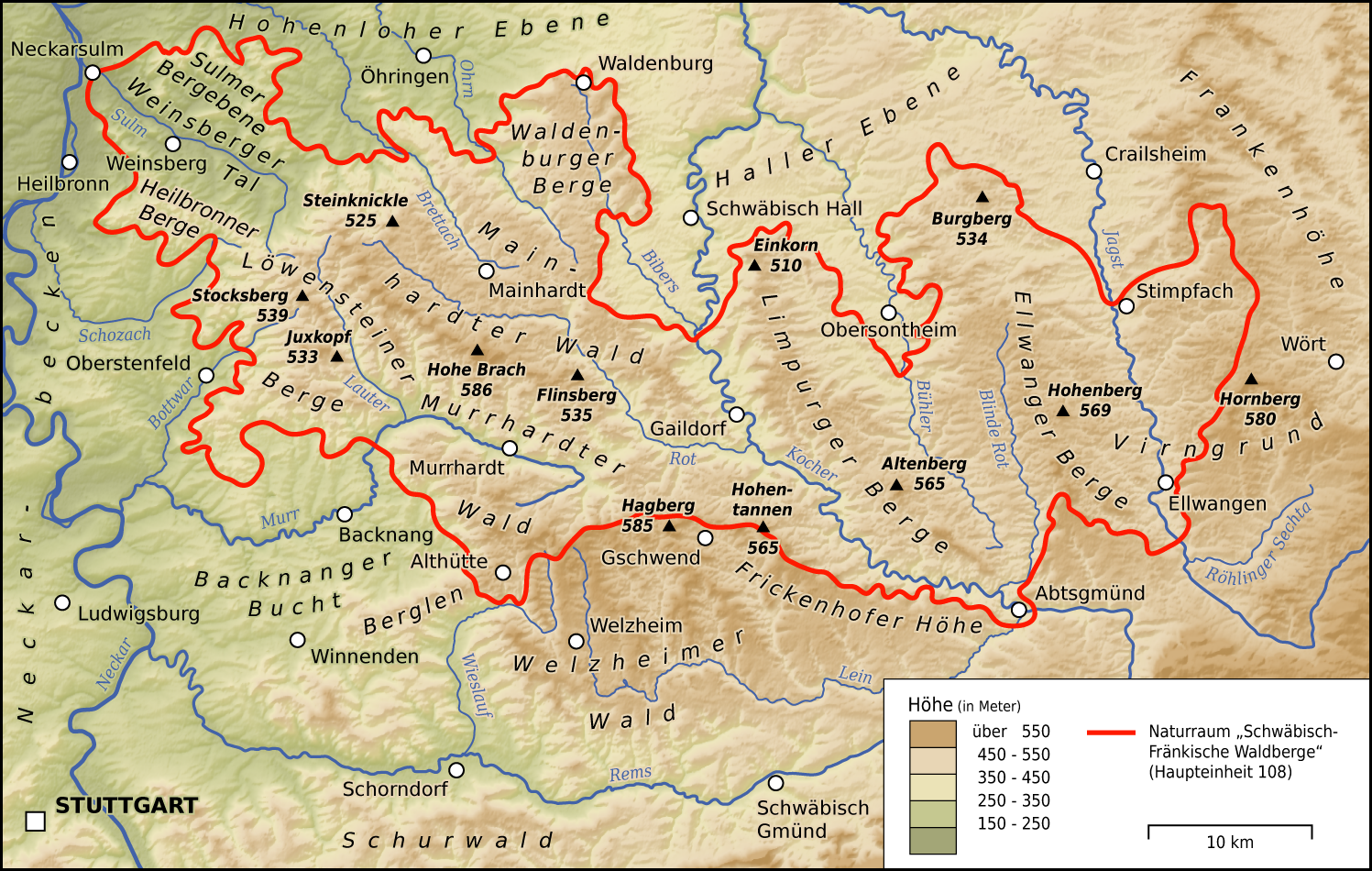
- The Murrhardt Forest in the southwest of the Swabian-Franconian Forest

Highest point
- Peak: Hohenstein
- Elevation: 572 m above NHN

Geography
- Range coordinates: 48°58′25″N 9°30′10″E
- Parent range: Swabian-Franconian Forest

The Murrhardt Forest (German: Murrhardter Wald) in the Baden-Württemberg county of Rems-Murr-Kreis is part of the natural region known as the Swabian-Franconian Forest. It reaches a maximum height of 572 m above sea level (NHN). It takes its name from the town of Murrhardt in the centre.

== Geography ==
=== Location ===
The Murrhardt Forest lies around 35 kilometres (as the crow flies) northeast of Stuttgart and almost due southeast of Heilbronn, between the Mainhardt Forest to the northeast and east, the Welzheim Forest to the south, the Backnang Basin to the west and the Löwenstein Hills to the northwest.

The Central Uplands forest is situated on either side of the axis of the Murr valley, more of it lying to the left of the river. The region is fringed by the settlements of Oberrot to the northeast, Fichtenberg to the east, Kaisersbach to the southeast, Althütte and Auenwald to the south, Backnang to the southwest, Oppenweiler to the west and Sulzbach an der Murr to the northwest.

The woods are drained by the River Murr, which rises here and runs through them heading westwards after making a marked bend, before discharging into the River Neckar still further to the west. At the bend in the upper reaches of the Murr it is joined by its larger streams, the Otterbach and Fornsbach. In Murrhardt it is joined by the Trauzenbach and Hörschbach, and, further downstream to the west, the Harbach, Eschelbach and Haselbach. It flows, like numerous smaller streams, for much of its way through wooded klingen and sometimes drops over rock ledges, as the Hörschbach does at its two high waterfalls.

The largest lake in the Murrhardt Forest is the Waldsee ("Forest Lake"), near the village of Fornsbach, which has an area of 2 hectares and is open to tourists.

=== Hills ===
Among the hills, high points and spurs of the Murrhardt Forest are the following − sorted by height in metres (m) above sea level (NHN):

- Hohenstein (ca. 572 m), 0.8 km south-southeast of Sechselberg in the municipality of Althütte
- Zollstock (543.7 m, Südhang heißt Wüstenberg), 1.5 km south-southwest of Sulzbach-Ittenberg
- Hoblersberg (539.2 m), 1.1 km south-southeast of Murrhardt-Waltersberg
- Springstein (532.5 m), 0.9 km southwest of Murrhardt-Siebenknie
- Hornberg (490.4 m), 0.5 km west-northwest of Fichtenberg-Hornberg
- Linderst (Name des Südhangs) (460.4 m), 0.8 km north-northwest of the Murrhardter Almsiedlung
- Raitberg (447.3 m), 1 km east of Murrhardt-Köchersberg

== Nature and landscape conservation, tourism ==
Large areas of the Murrhardt Forest are designated as protected landscapes, smaller ones as nature reserves. It lies almost entirely within the Swabian-Franconian Forest.
