= Franz Ruff =

German architect

Franz Ruff (1906 in Straubing – 1979 in Prien am Chiemsee) was a minor architect during the National Socialist regime in Germany, the son of Ludwig Ruff and responsible for completing the Nuremberg Party Congress Hall after his father's death in 1934. Along with Albert Speer, Paul Ludwig Troost and his father Ludwig Ruff, Ruff is one of the best-known architects of the 'Third Reich', who were entrusted with typical representative buildings and in this respect are considered to have set the style for this period. In 1944, Ruff was on the Gottbegnadeten list of the Reich Ministry for Popular Enlightenment and Propaganda.

== See also ==
- Nazi architecture
