= Erich Zenger =

Erich Zenger (July 5, 1939, in Dollnstein – April 4, 2010, in Münster) was a German Roman Catholic priest and theologian. Ordained in 1964, Zenger studied in Rome, Italy.

From 1973 to 2004, he served as a professor of Old Testament studies at the University of Münster/Westfalen, and he wrote books and papers on the Old Testament.
