= Ludwig Ruff =

German architect

Ludwig Ruff (29 May 1878 – 15 August 1934) was an architect in Germany. Born in Dollnstein, he was the father of Franz Ruff, who would later be responsible for completing the Nuremberg Party Congress Hall left unfinished by his father's death in Nuremberg, in 1934.

== See also ==
- Nazi architecture
