= Hüttenbach (Altmühl) =

River in Germany

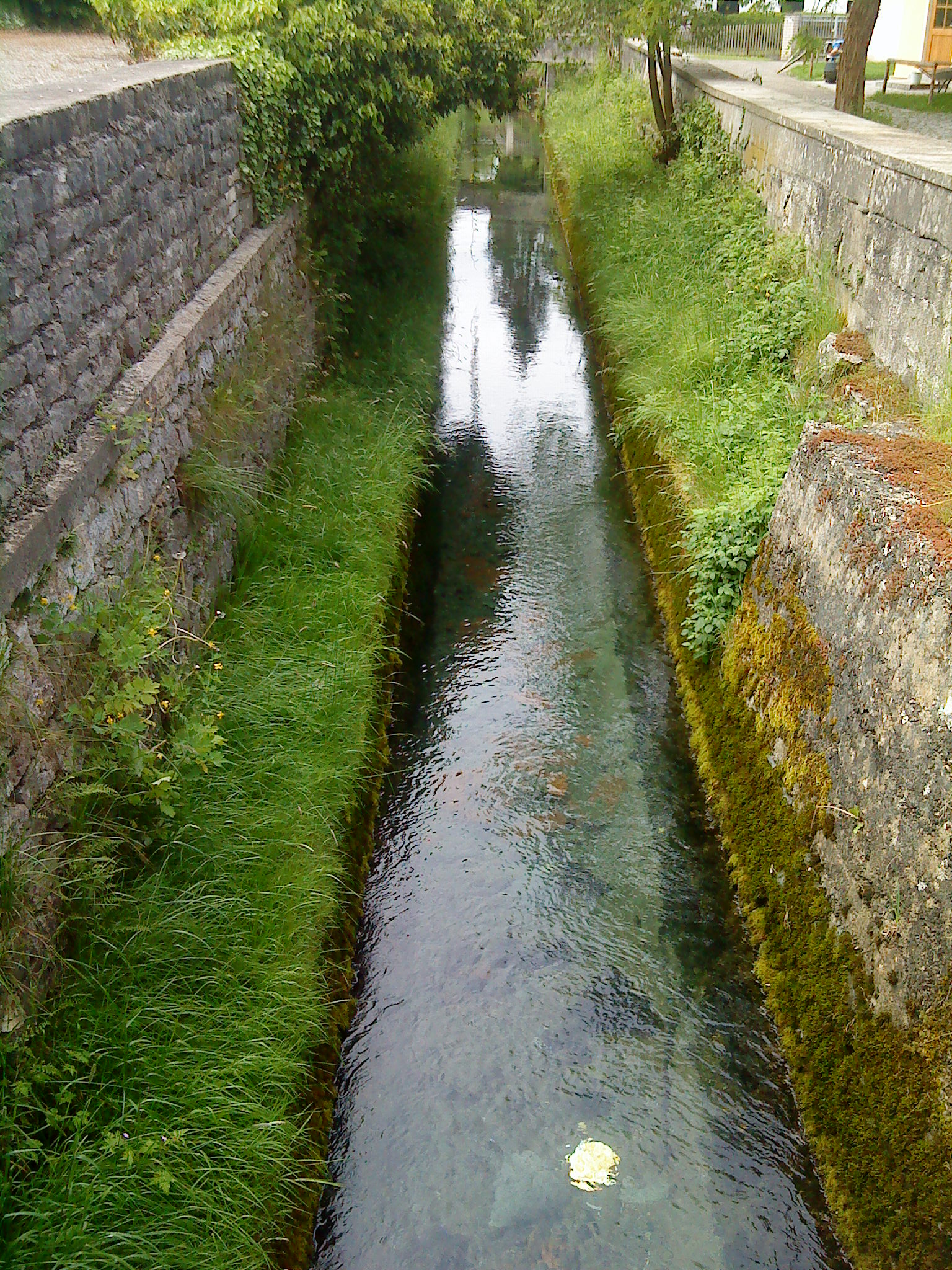
- The Hüttenbach in Obereichstätt

Location
- Country: Germany
- States: Bavaria

Physical characteristics
- Mouth
  - location: Altmühl
  - coordinates: 48.8917°N 11.1334°E
- Length: 255 m (837 ft)

Basin features
- Progression: Altmühl→ Danube→ Black Sea

Hüttenbach is a river of Bavaria, Germany. It is a 255 m long, left tributary of the Altmühl at Obereichstätt. Its source is a karst spring.

== See also ==
- List of rivers of Bavaria
