= Nazi Party rally grounds =

Complex of structures and clearings built for political rallies in Nuremberg, Germany

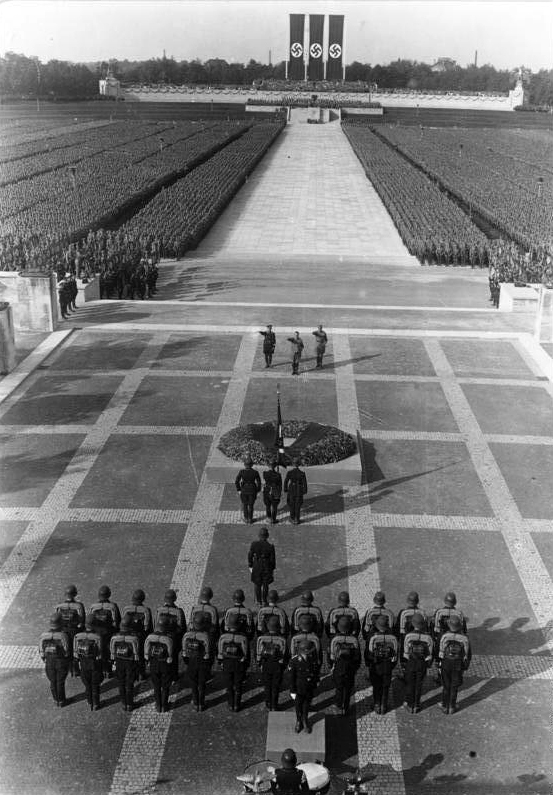
Reichsparteitag 1934, Luitpoldarena, "Totenehrung" (honouring of dead): SS leader Heinrich Himmler, Adolf Hitler and SA leader Viktor Lutze on the terrace in front of the "Ehrenhalle" (Hall of Honour); in the background: the crescent-shaped "Ehrentribüne" (literally: tribune of honour)

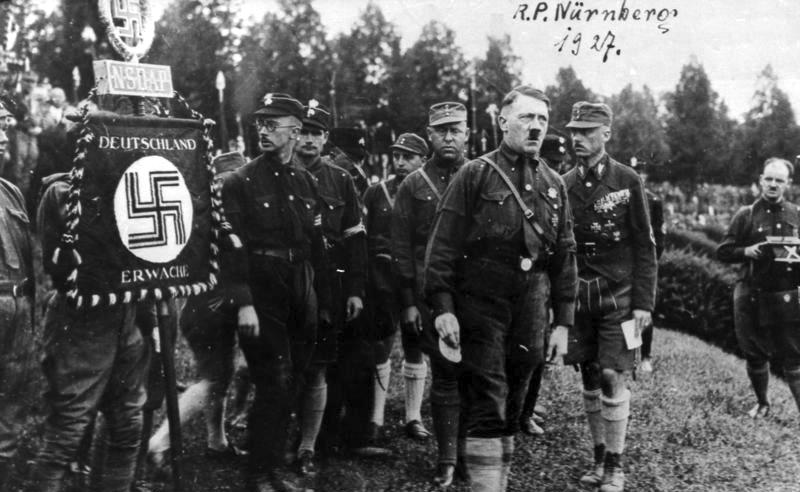
First Party Congress in Nuremberg (1927)

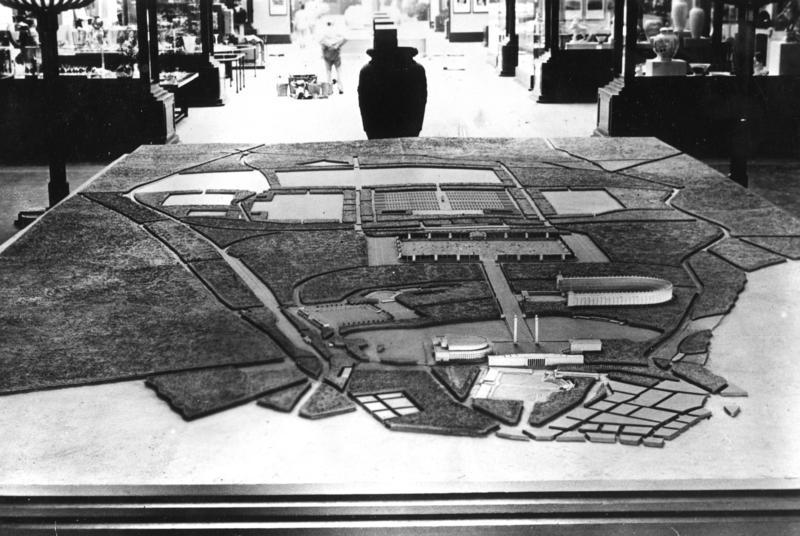
Mock-up of the Rally grounds in their planned finished shape at the World Fair in Paris (1937)

The Nazi party rally grounds (German: Reichsparteitagsgelände, lit. 'Reich Party Congress Grounds') collectively describe a complex of megastructures and clearings which together occupy around 11 square kilometres (1,100 ha) of land to the southeast of Nuremberg, Germany. Six Nazi party rallies were held there between 1933 and 1938.

== History ==
On 30 August 1933, Hitler declared Nuremberg the "City of the Reichsparteitage". The Party Congresses (Reichsparteitage) were a self-portrayal of the NS-state and had no programmatic task, simply demonstrating the unity of the nation. In a propagandistic way a relation was to be drawn between the Nazi movement and the glory of the medieval emperors and the meetings of the Imperial Estates which had been held in Nuremberg in the Middle Ages.

The grounds were designed by Hitler's architect Albert Speer, except for the Congress Hall, which was designed by Ludwig and Franz Ruff. However, only Zeppelinfeld, Luitpoldarena, and Große Straße were finished.

The Rally Grounds included:

- the Luitpoldarena, a deployment area
- the Luitpold Hall or "Old Congress Hall" (damaged during World War II, later demolished)
- the Kongresshalle (Congress Hall) or Neue Kongresshalle (New Congress Hall) (unfinished)
- the Zeppelinfeld (Zeppelin Field), another deployment area
- the Märzfeld (March Field) (unfinished, later demolished), a deployment area for the Wehrmacht (army)
- the Deutsche Stadion (German stadium) (only foundations were built), which was to be the largest sports stadium in the world
- the former Stadion der Hitlerjugend ("stadium of the Hitler Youth", today Max-Morlock-Stadion)
- the Große Straße ("Great Road"), a (never-used) parade road

A "Haus der Kultur" (House of Culture) and a representative entrance portal towards the "Great Road" were planned at the northwestern end of the "Great Road", near the (new) Congress Hall.

=== Preservation and contemporary usage ===
The whole site is now a memorial maintained to commemorate the victims of Nazi repression. The Kongresshalle, Zeppelinfeld, and the Große Straße have been protected monuments since 1973 as significant examples of Nazi Party architecture.

Post war the site has been used for numerous activities. For example, it has hosted the annual Norisring Speedweekend motorsport festival since 1947, and the Rock im Park rock music festival since 2004.

== Structures ==
=== Luitpoldarena ===
From 1906 onwards, a park named Luitpoldhain (literally translated: "Luitpold grove", named after Luitpold, Prince Regent of Bavaria) existed here. During the Weimar Republic (1919–1933), the Ehrenhalle (Hall of Honour) was built in the park.

In 1933, Hitler replaced the park with a strictly-structured deployment area, the so-called Luitpoldarena, with an area of 84,000 square metres (8.4 ha).

During the party rallies, deployments of the SA and the SS with up to 150,000 people took place in this area. The central "relic" here was the Blutfahne (Blood flag), which was allegedly carried by the Beer Hall Putsch rebels and was soaked with the blood of one of them. At the Blutfahnenweihe (Blood flag consecration), new Standarten (flags) of SA- and SS-units were "consecrated" by touching their guidons with the Blutfahne.

After 1945 the city of Nuremberg redesigned the area into a park again. All buildings from the Nazi era were demolished. Only the half-round of the terraces of the main grandstand remains.

==== Ehrenhalle (Hall of Honour) ====
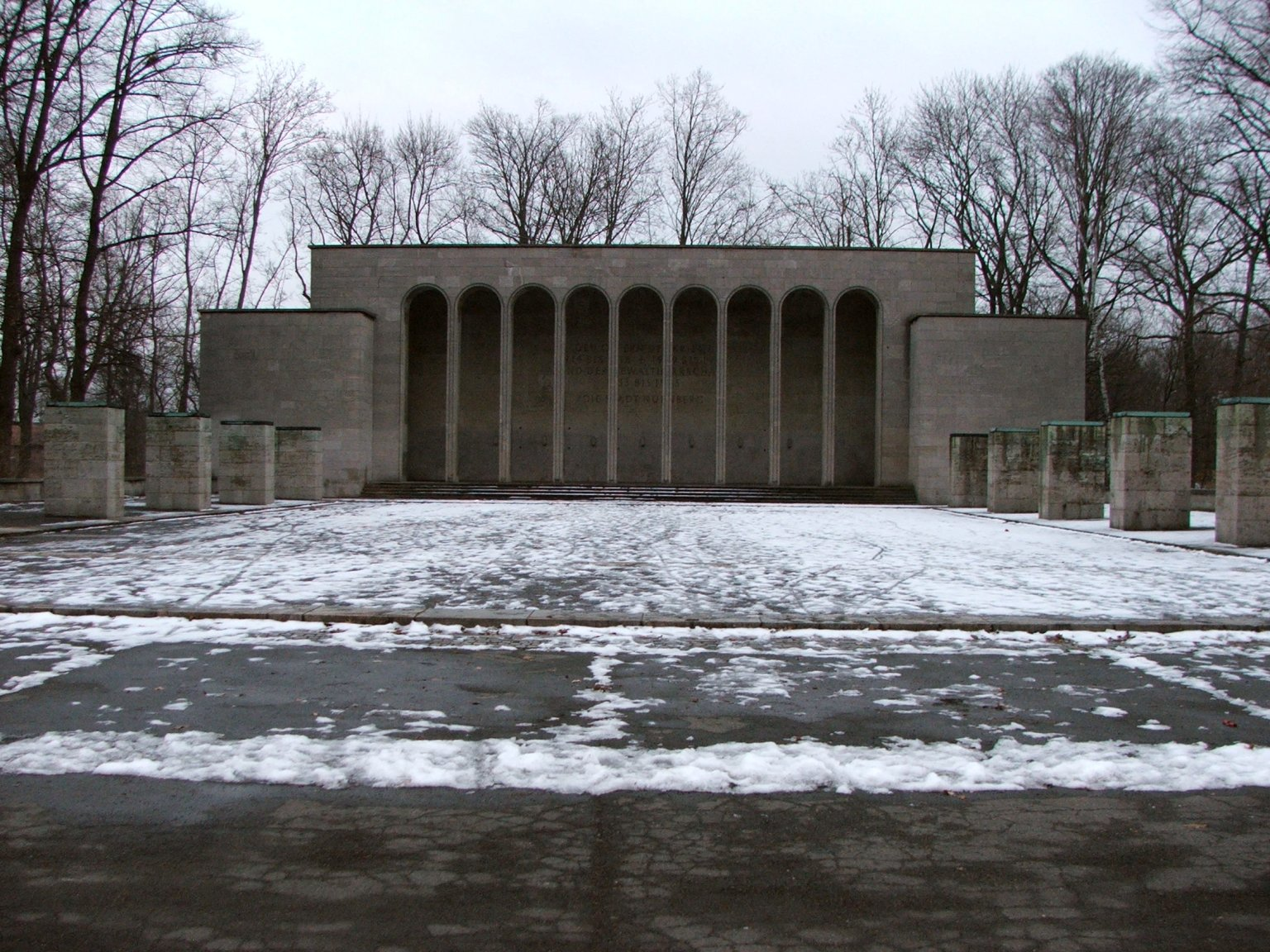
"Ehrenhalle" (Hall of Honour) in the "Luitpoldhain" (park)

Ehrenhalle in Bavaria
- Location within Bavaria

General information
- Coordinates: 49.4355°N 11.1082°E

The Ehrenhalle was built by the City of Nuremberg according to a plan of German architect Fritz Mayer. It was inaugurated in 1930, before the Hitler era during the Weimar Republic. It is an arcaded hall with an adjacent cobbled stone terrace with two rows of pedestals for fire bowls. All fourteen pylons remain virtually intact and have not been ignited since the final Nazi party rally in September 1938. Originally the hall was to be a memorial site for the 9,855 soldiers from Nuremberg who had fallen in World War I.

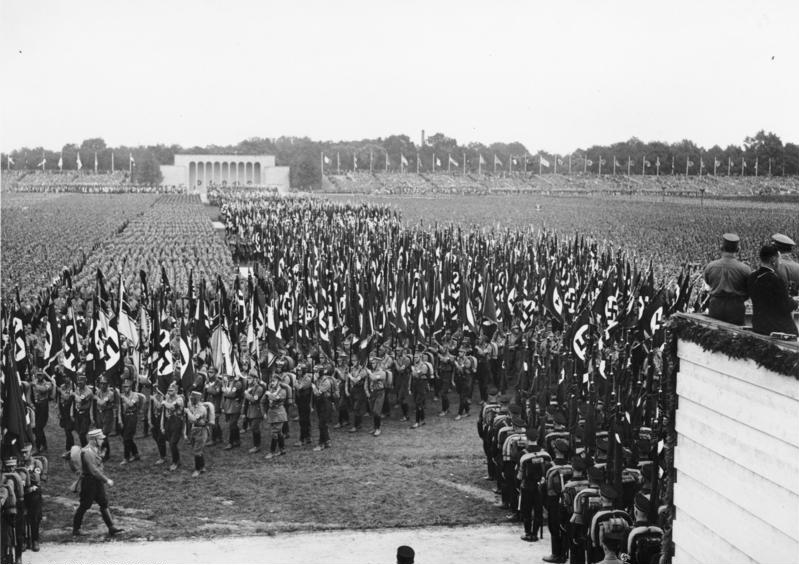
SA deployment, Luitpoldarena, Reichsparteitag 1933; in the background: the "Ehrenhalle" (Hall of Honour)

During the Party Congress of 1929 the then unfinished Ehrenhalle was first used to memorialize dead. During the Third Reich the Nazis used the site primarily as a commemoration for the fallen soldiers of World War I and commemoration of the 16 dead of the "Hitlerputsch" (the so-called "Martyrs of the National Socialist Movement") (Beer Hall Putsch) on 9 November 1923 in Munich. Hitler, accompanied by SS leader Heinrich Himmler and SA leader Viktor Lutze, strode through the arena over the 240-meter-long granite path from the main grandstand to the terrace of the Ehrenhalle and showed the Nazi salute there. The ritual was the climax of the celebration.

==== Ehrentribüne (Tribune of Honour) ====
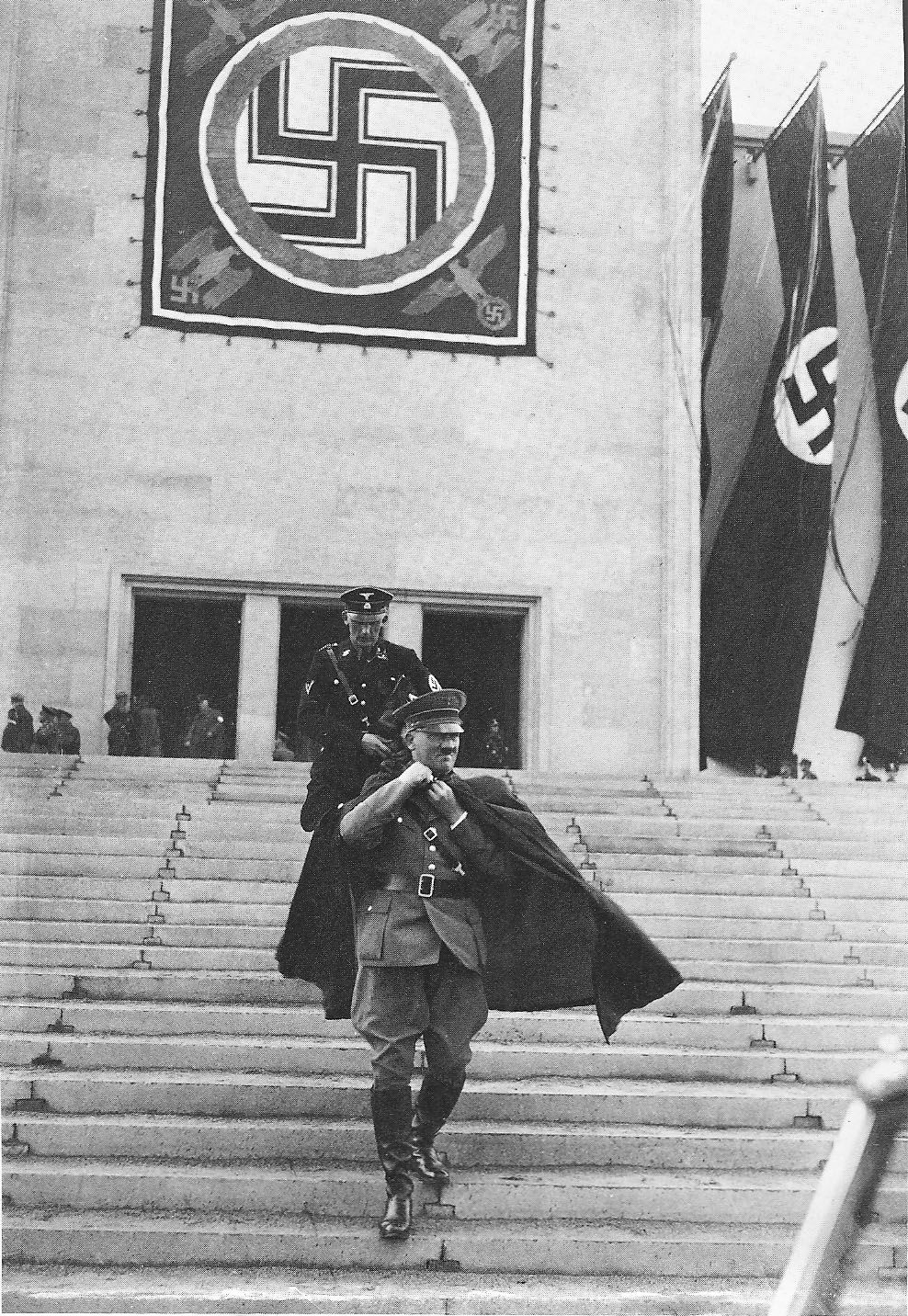
Adolf Hitler in Nuremberg (1936)

Opposite the Ehrenhalle the crescent-shaped Ehrentribüne (literally: tribune of honour) or main grandstand which measured 150 m (490 ft) long with 6 m (20 ft) gold eagles on each end was built. This structure, built by architect Albert Speer, could seat 500 dignitaries and represented the first permanent structure built by the Nazis in Nuremberg.

The Ehrenhalle and the Ehrentribüne were connected by a wide granite path. The Ehrentribüne was blown up in 1959/60.

=== Luitpoldhalle (Luitpold Hall) ===
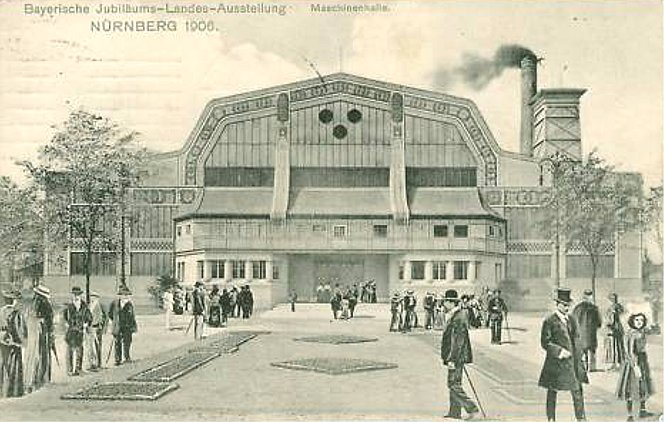
The later Luitpold Hall as machine hall (postcard from 1906)

The Luitpold Hall (Luitpoldhalle) (built 1906) had an outline of 180 m × 50 m (590 ft × 160 ft) featured 76 loudspeakers, 42 spotlights, the largest pipe organ in Germany and could seat 16,000 people. Dating back to the Bavarian Exposition, the former machine hall was renovated and first used by the Nazis for the party congress of 1934. Its monumental neoclassic facade featured a shell of limestone facing with three enormous entrance portals. It was in this building during the party congress of 1935, that the Nuremberg laws were adopted which deprived German Jews and other minorities of their citizenship. The structure was severely damaged by allied bombs in early 1945 and a few years later replaced by a parking lot. The granite staircase leading to the building remains intact today.

=== Kongresshalle (Congress Hall) ===
The Congress Hall (Die Kongresshalle) is the biggest preserved Nazi monumental building and is landmarked. It was planned by the Nuremberg architects Ludwig and Franz Ruff. It was intended to serve as a congress centre for the NSDAP with a self-supporting roof and would have provided 50,000 seats. It was located on the shore of and in the pond Dutzendteich and marked the entrance of the rally grounds. The building reached a height of 39 m (128 ft) (a height of 70 m was planned) and a diameter of 250 m (820 ft).

The building is mostly built out of clinker with a facade of granite panels. The design (especially the outer facade, among other features) is inspired by the Colosseum in Rome. The foundation stone was laid in 1935, but the building remained unfinished and without a roof. The building with an outline of an "U" ends with two head-buildings. Since 2001, the Dokumentationszentrum Reichsparteitagsgelände (Documentation Center of the Nazi Party Rally Grounds), with the permanent exhibition Faszination und Gewalt (Fascination and Violence), has been located in the northern wing. In the southern building, the Serenadenhof, the Nuremberg Symphony Orchestra have their domicile.

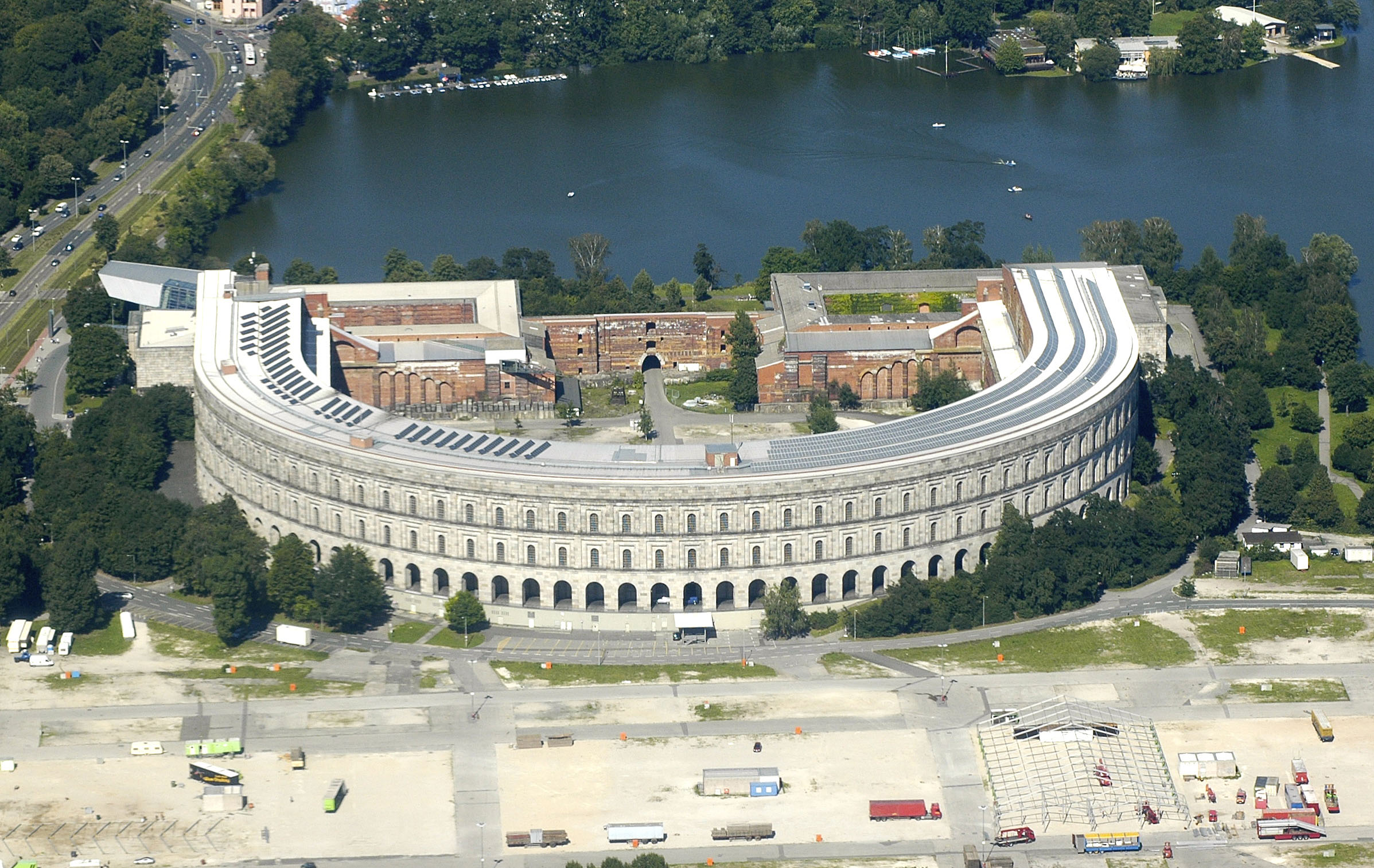
Aerial photo of the Congress Hall, 2009

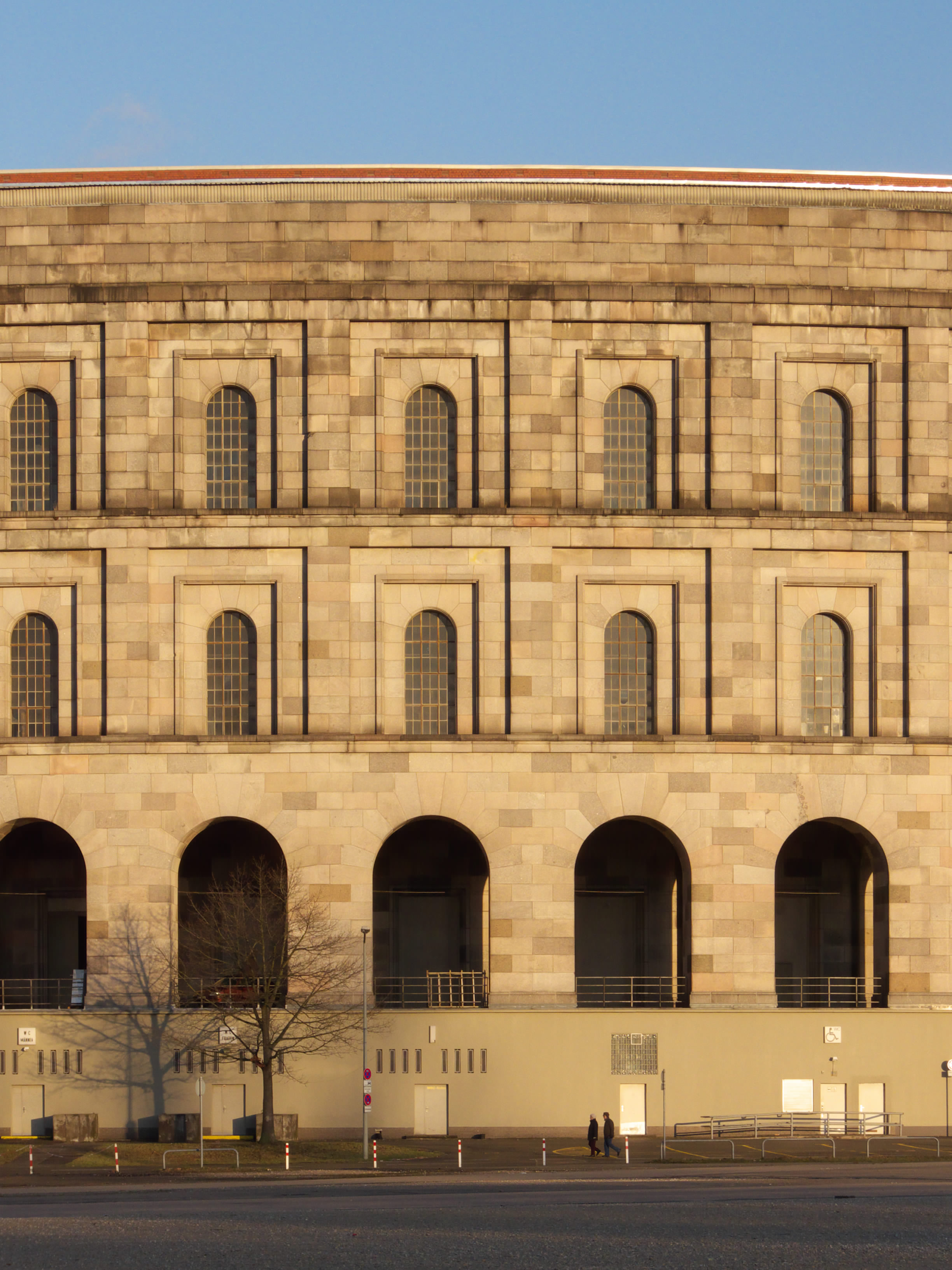
Front of the Congress Hall, detail

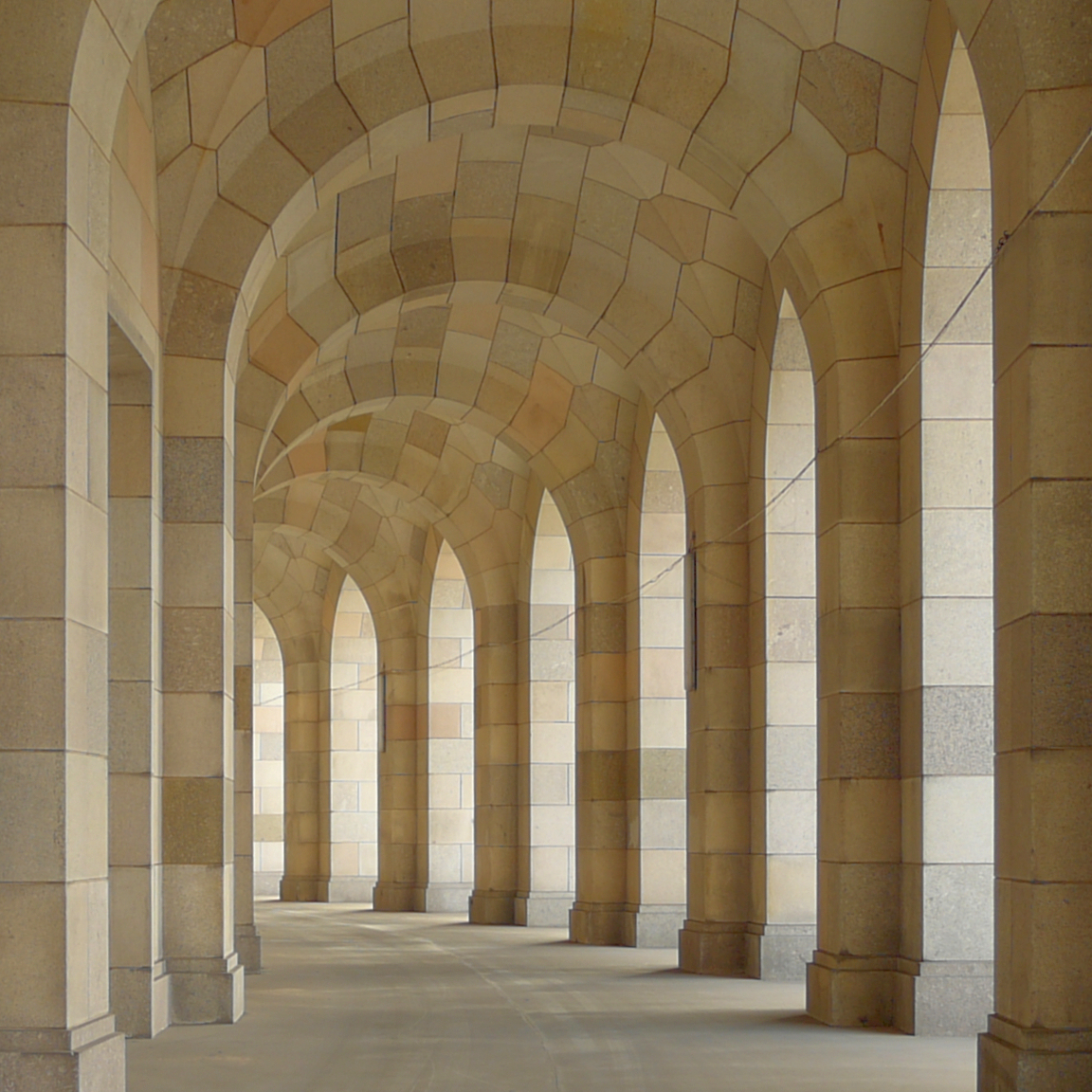
Congress Hall, Arcade Walk

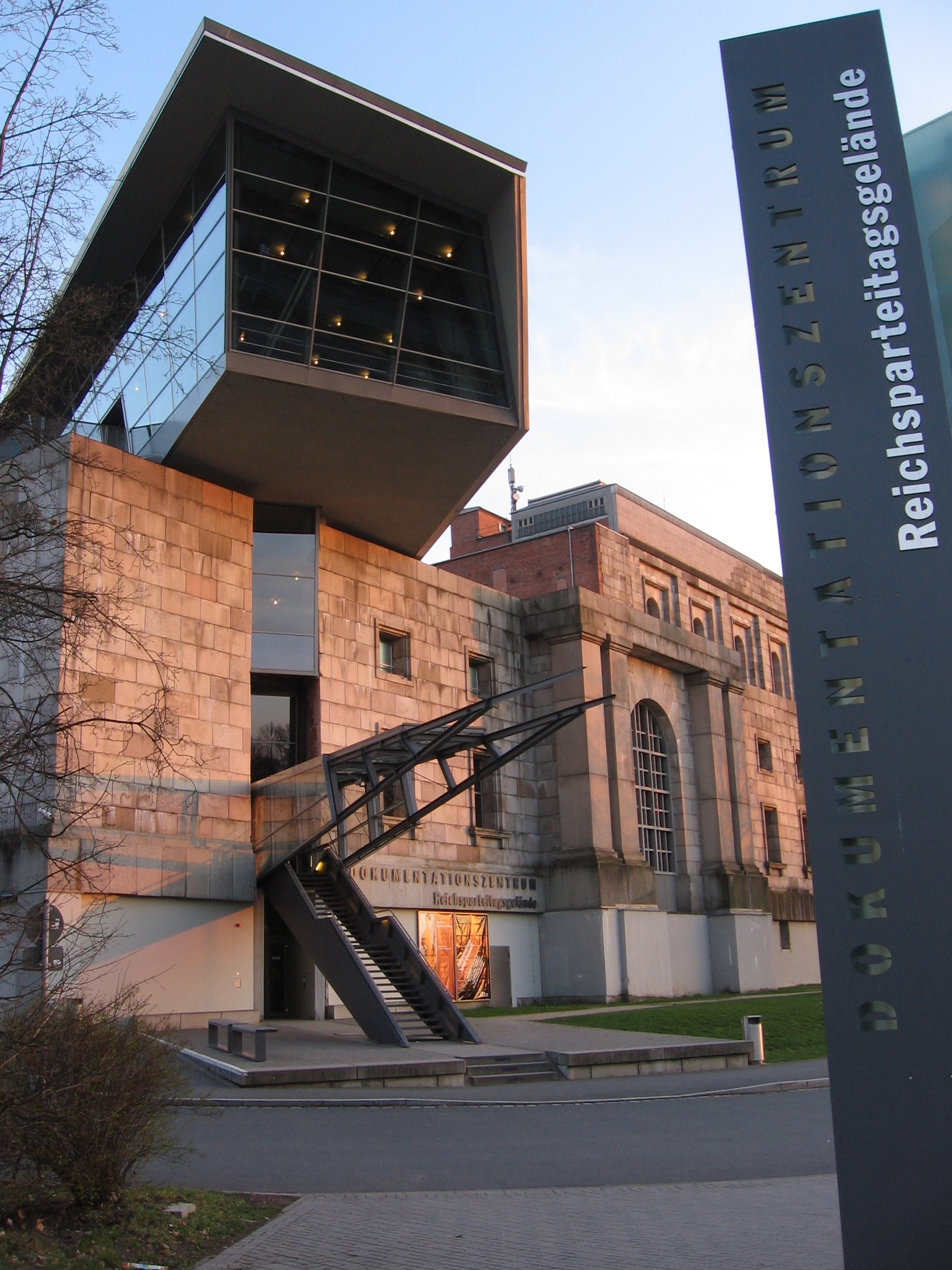
Documentation Center in the north wing of the Congress Hall

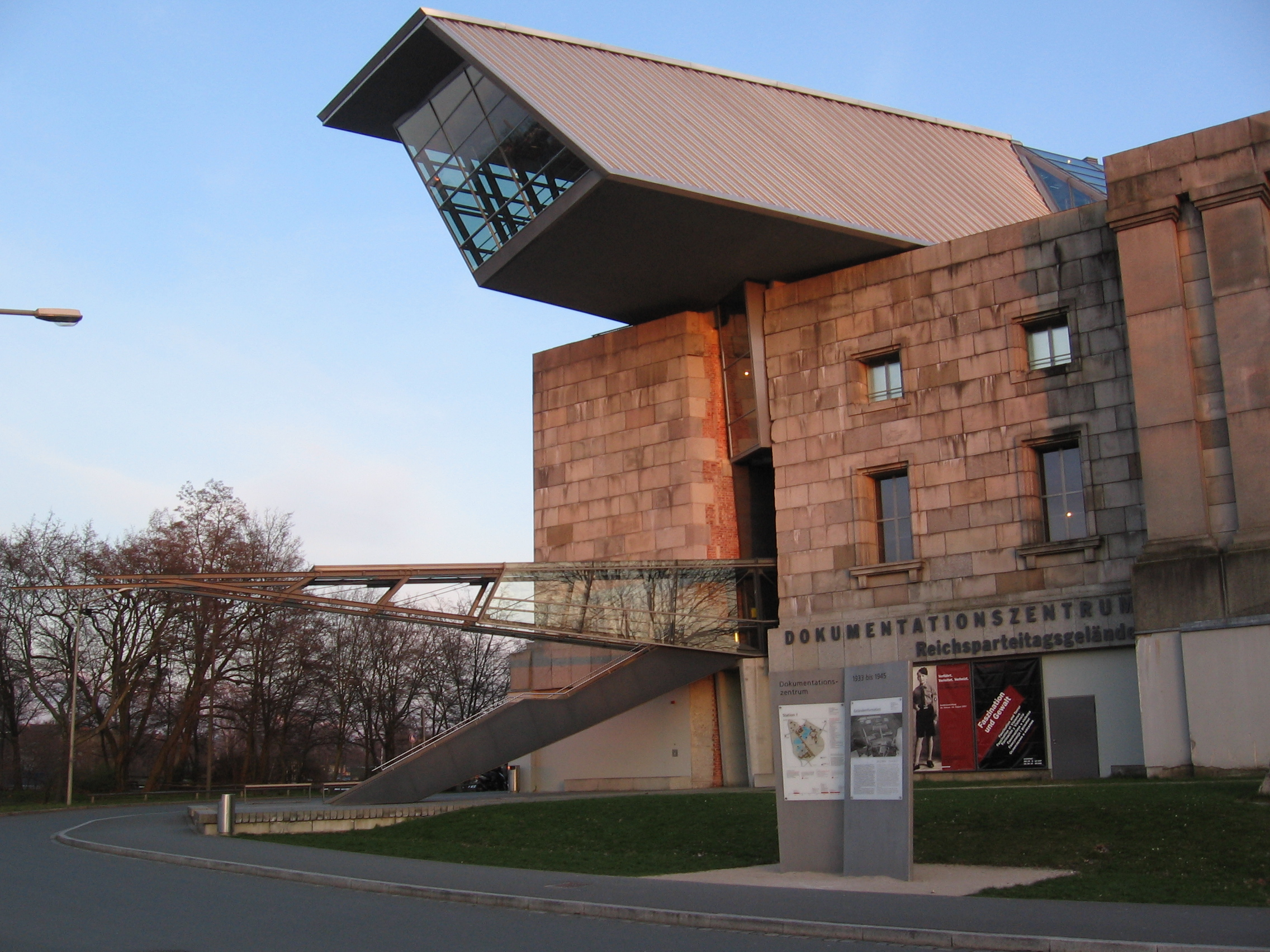
Documentation Center; with its "glass and steel arrow", piercing the north wing, the Documentation Center is supposed to be a widely visible architectural counterpoint.
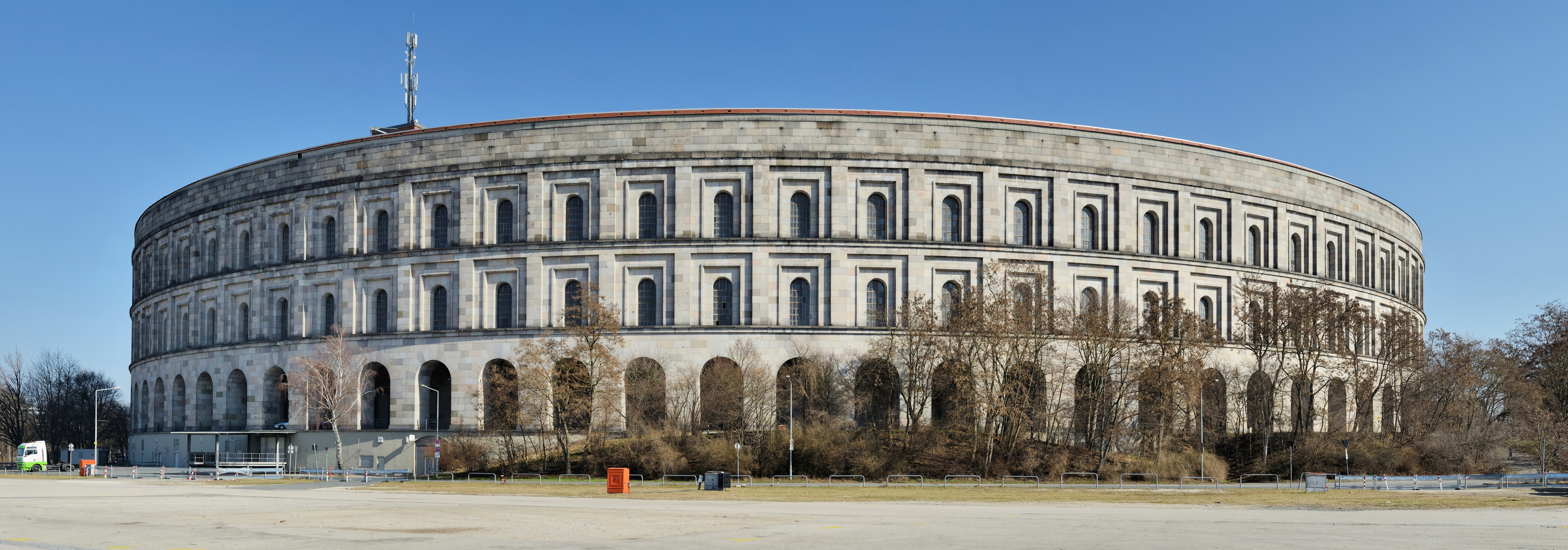
Kongresshalle (Congress Hall)

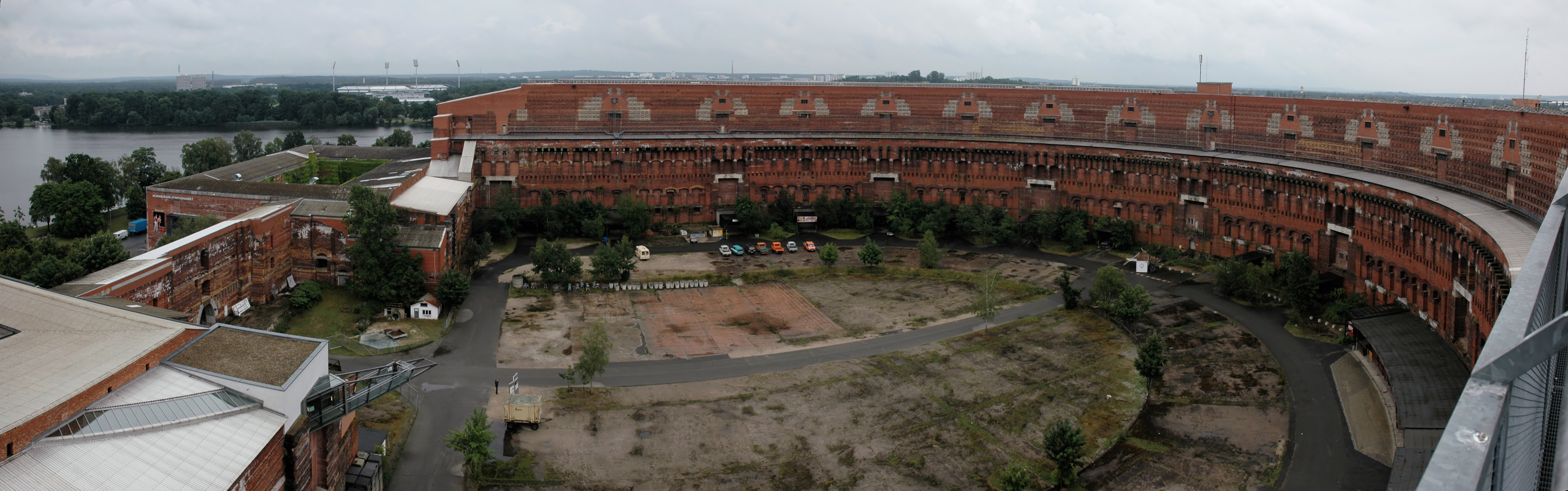
Inner courtyard of the Congress Hall, 2008

=== Great Road (Große Straße) ===
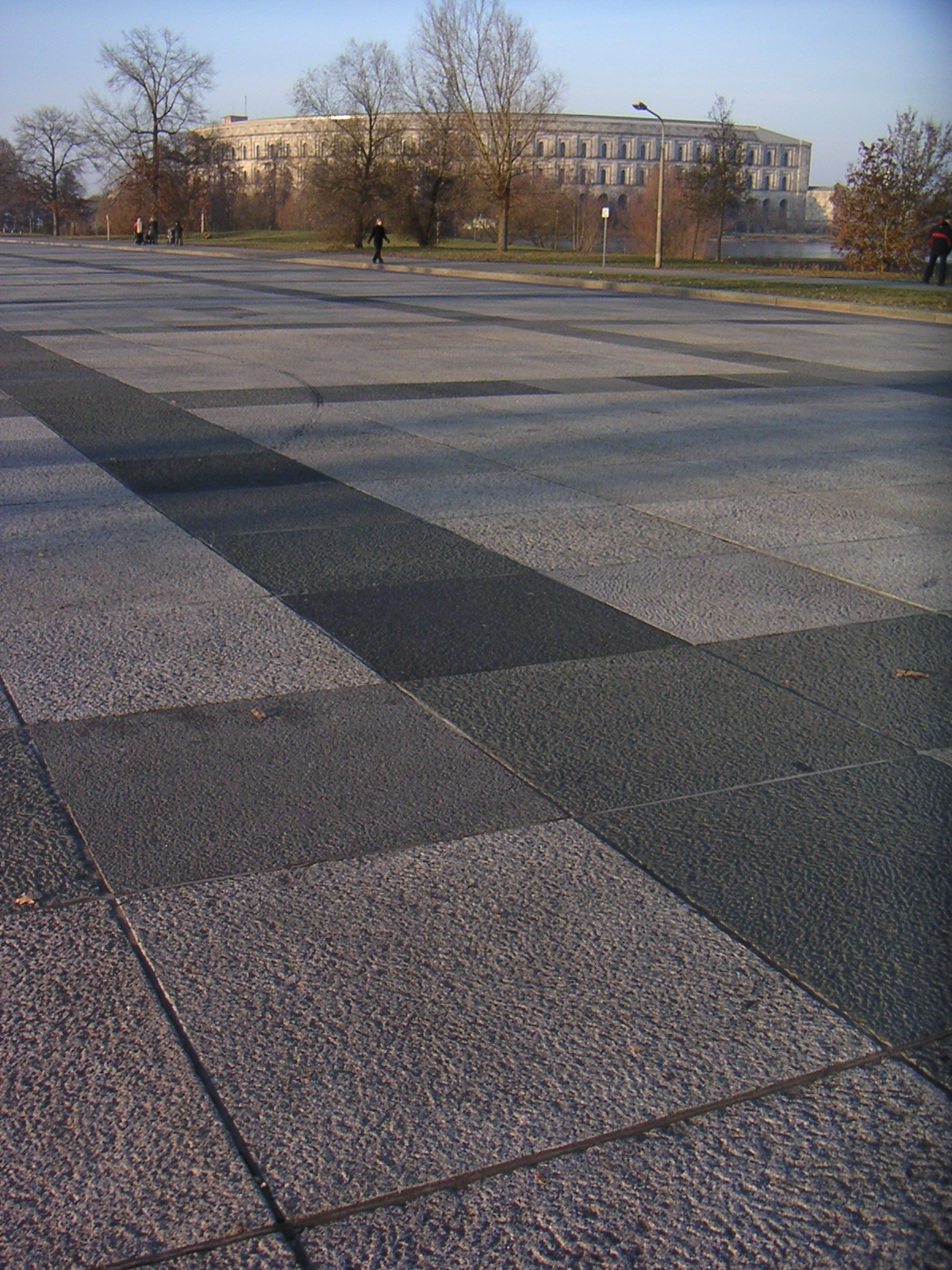
Große Straße (Congress Hall in the background)

The great road is almost 2 km (1.2 mi) long and 60 m (200 ft) wide. It was intended to be the central axis of the site and a parade road for the Wehrmacht. In its northwestern prolongation the road points towards Nuremberg Castle. This was to create a relation between the role of Nuremberg during the Third Reich and its role during medieval times.

The road reached from the Congress Hall to the Märzfeld, the construction work started in 1935 and was finished in 1939 (it has never been used as a parade road, as due to the beginning of World War II, the last rally was held in 1938). The pavement was made of granite pavers in black and gray with edges of exactly 1.2 m (3.9 ft). A representative entrance portal and two pylons were planned at the northwestern end of the Great Road. Near the entrance area of the German Stadion a grandstand with a hall of pillars was planned for the government leaders and generals which were to take the salute on Wehrmacht formations which were to march in direction of the parade ground Märzfeld.

After the war, the road was used as a temporary airfield for the US Army as the pre-war airports of Nuremberg were either in neighboring Fürth (Fürth Airfield) or destroyed by the war (Marienberg Airport). Only in 1955 did the current Nuremberg Airport come into being and replace the need for such makeshift temporary stopgaps.

Nowadays, it is used by the adjacently-located Nuremberg exhibition centre as an occasional parking area for highly-frequented events.

=== Zeppelinfeld ===
Zeppelinfeld Stadium
- Location within Germany

General information
- Coordinates: 49.4315°N 11.1252°E

The Zeppelinfeld (in English: Zeppelin Field) is located east of the Great Road. It consists of a large grandstand (Zeppelinhaupttribüne) with a width of 360 metres (390 yards) and a smaller stand. It was one of Albert Speer's first works for the Nazi party and was based upon the Pergamon Altar. Its square piers are inspired by the work of Franco-American architect Paul Philippe Cret. The grandstand is famous as the building that had the swastika blown from atop it in 1945, after Germany's fall in World War II. The name "Zeppelinfeld" or "Zeppelinwiese" refers to the fact that in August 1909 Ferdinand Graf von Zeppelin landed with one of his airships (LZ6) in this location.

From 1947 to 1995, the Nurnberg American High School, a DoDDS facility, used the field (called 'Soldiers Field') for high school football and American football practice. In 1967, the city authorities blew up the grandstand's double row of pillars, causing severe damage to the rest of the building. The remainder of the stand is intact and used as the centerpiece of the Norisring motor racing track. The German leg of the traveling heavy metal festival Monsters of Rock was held here twice during the 1980s. The field has also been used, and is still being used today, by the Nuremberg Rams American football team. Another part of the grounds is home to a campground. After years of neglect the damage due to erosion and dampness was severe, made worse by the poor quality of the initial construction. In 2019, an 85 million euros plan to conserve what remained of the stadium and make it accessible to visitors was announced, with a target completion date of 2025.

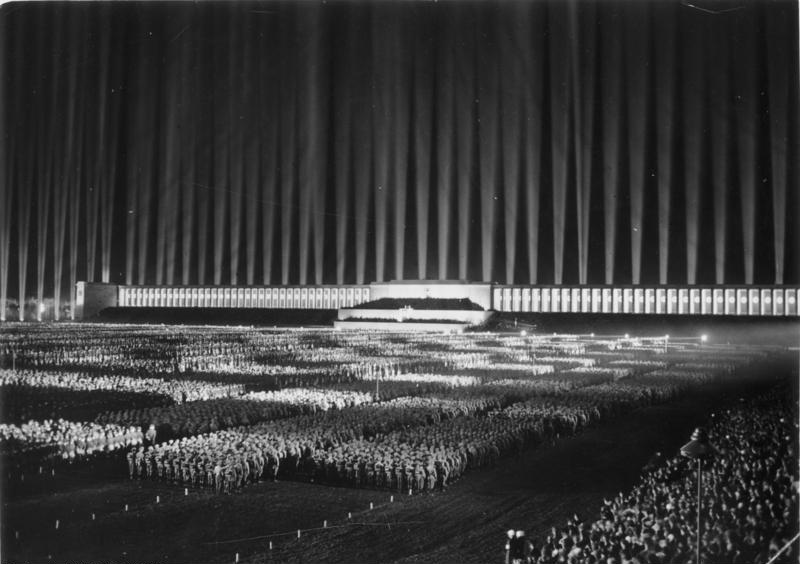
"Lichtdom" (Cathedral of Light), Party Congress 1936

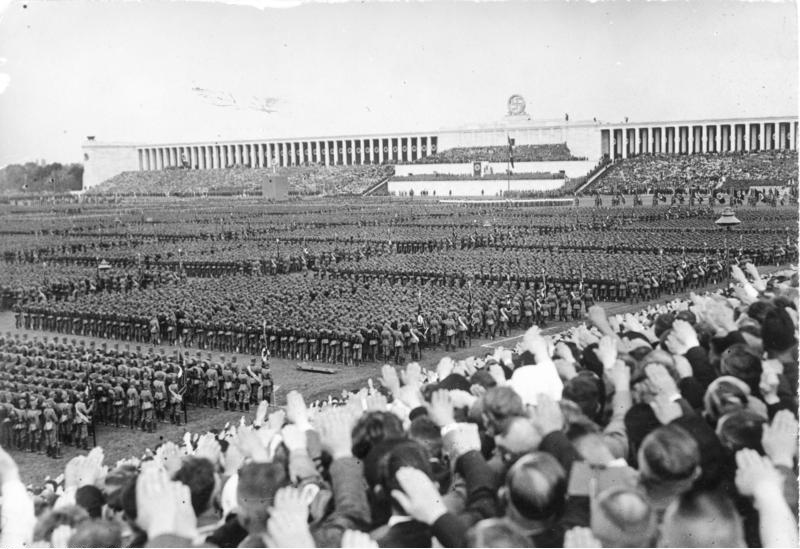
Muster of the Labour Service (RAD), Zeppelin Field, Party Congress 1937

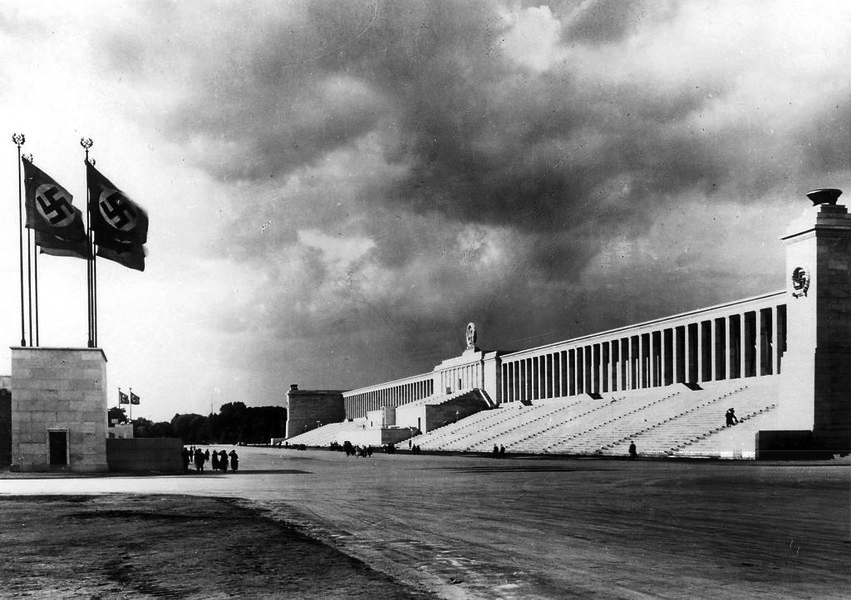
In 1938

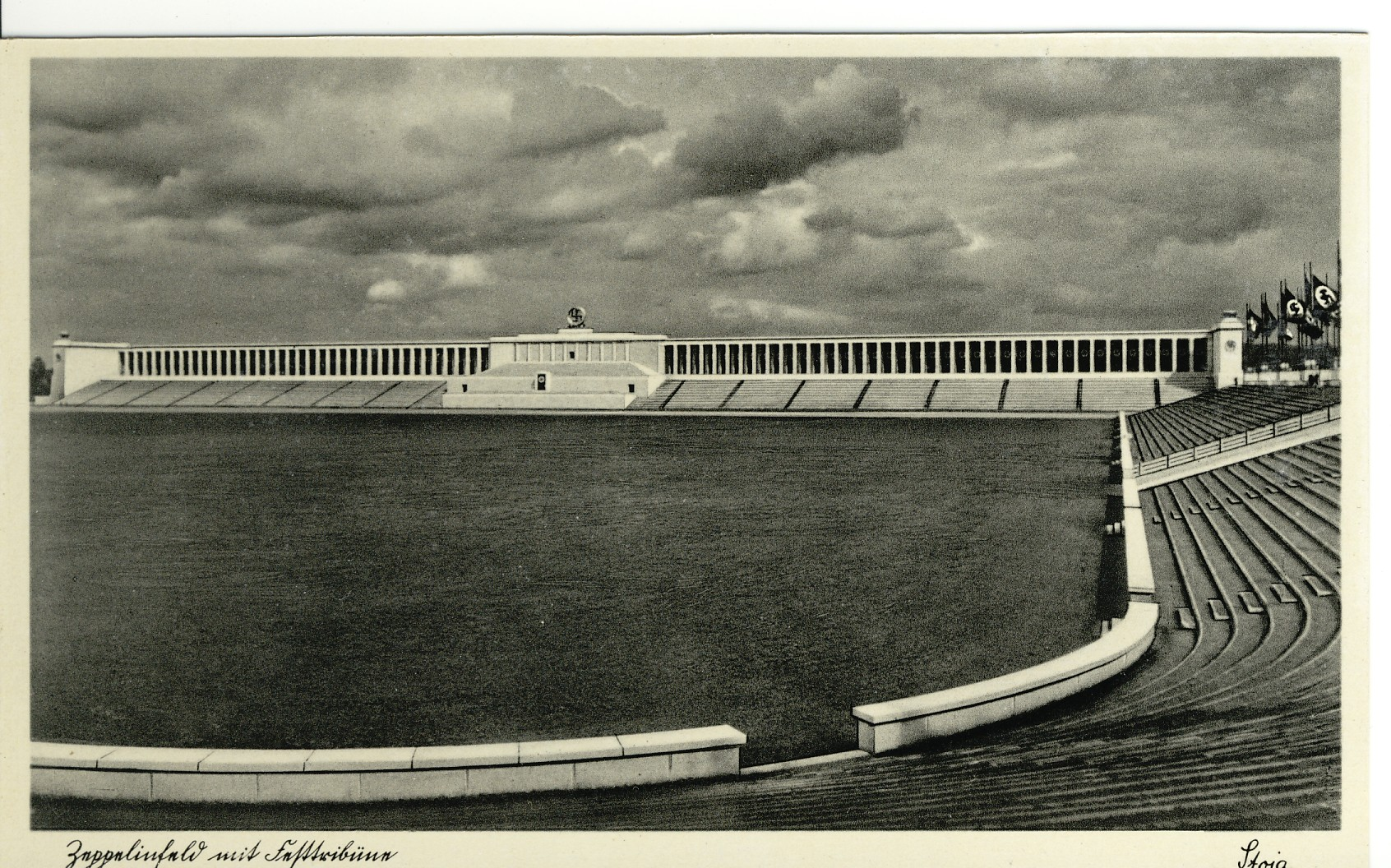
Zeppelinfeld, c. 1938

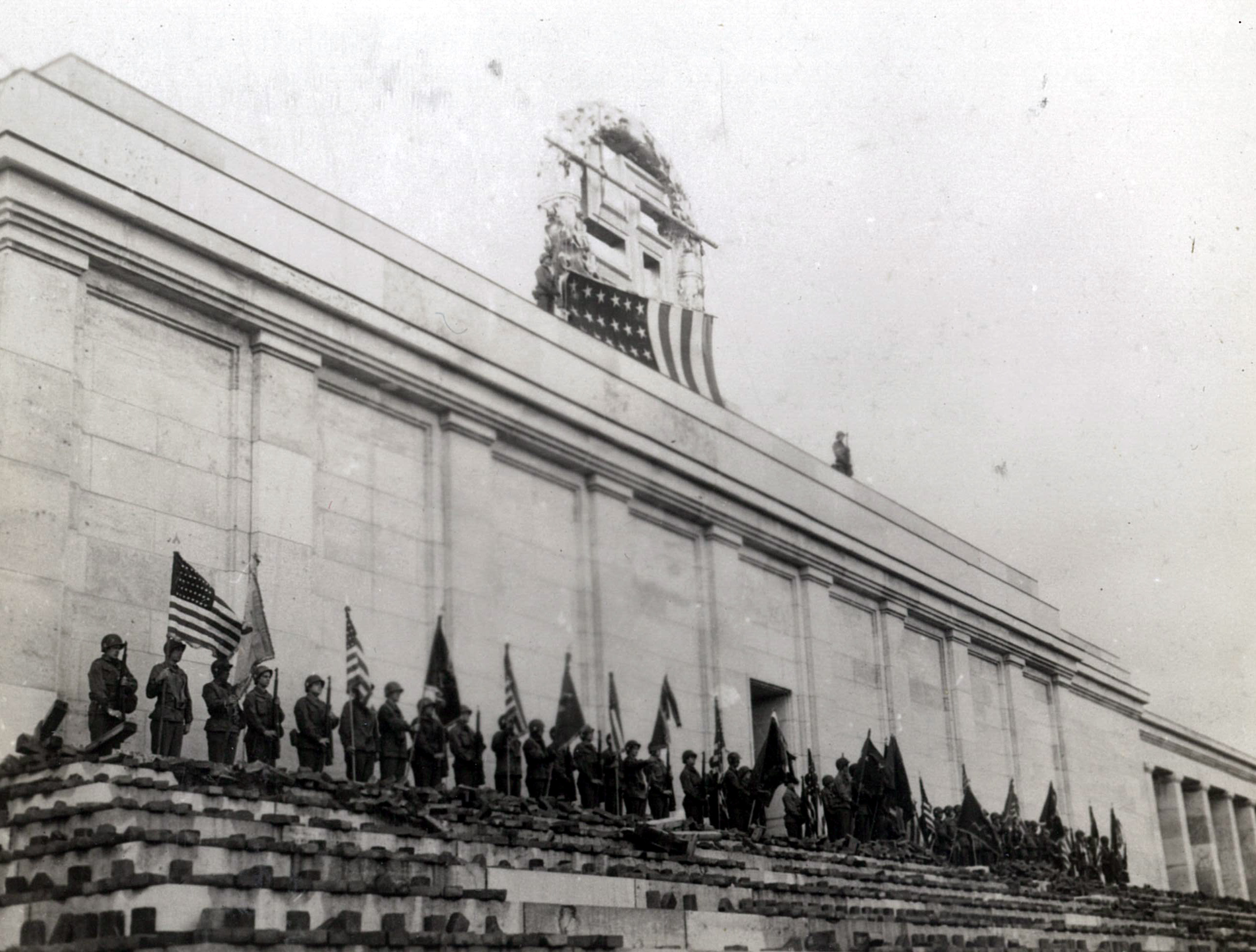
American forces at the Zeppelinfeld, April 1945

Film of the hakenkreuz on the grandstand being destroyed on April 22, 1945. Footage of the grandstand begins around the 3:13 timestamp.

GIF of the aforementioned destruction in 1945

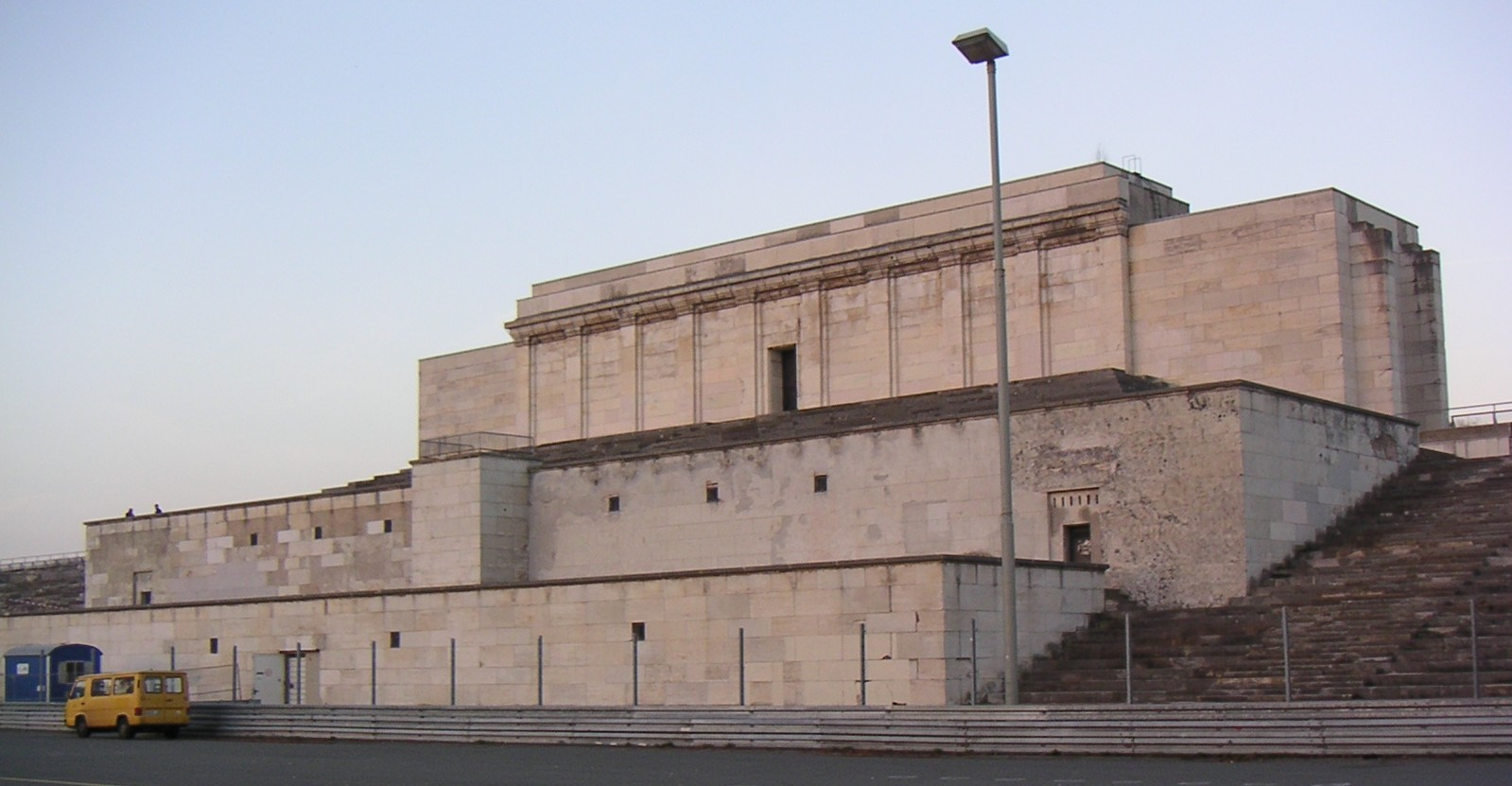
Zeppelinfeld, main tribune (December 2004)

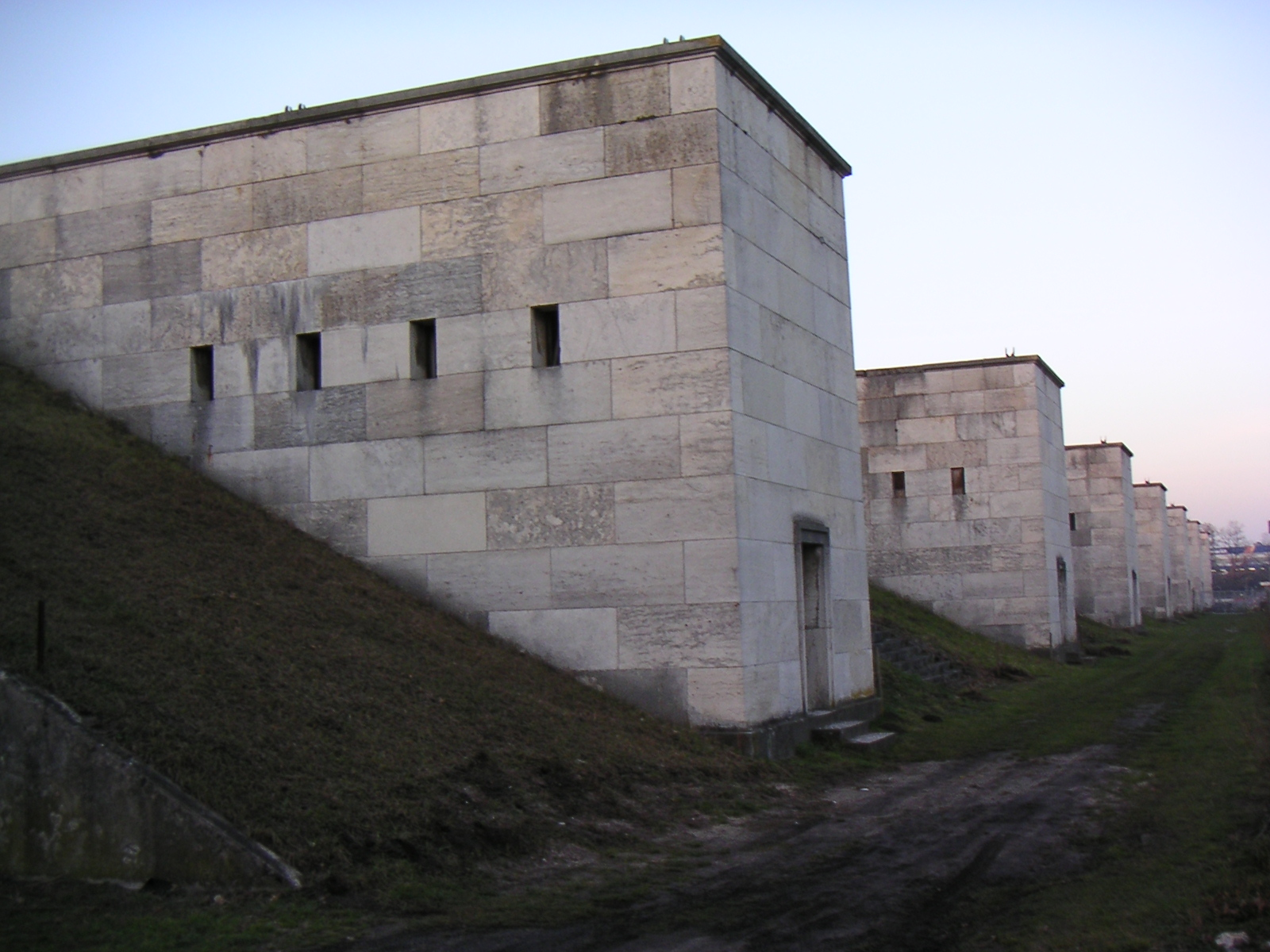
Zeppelinfeld (December 2004)

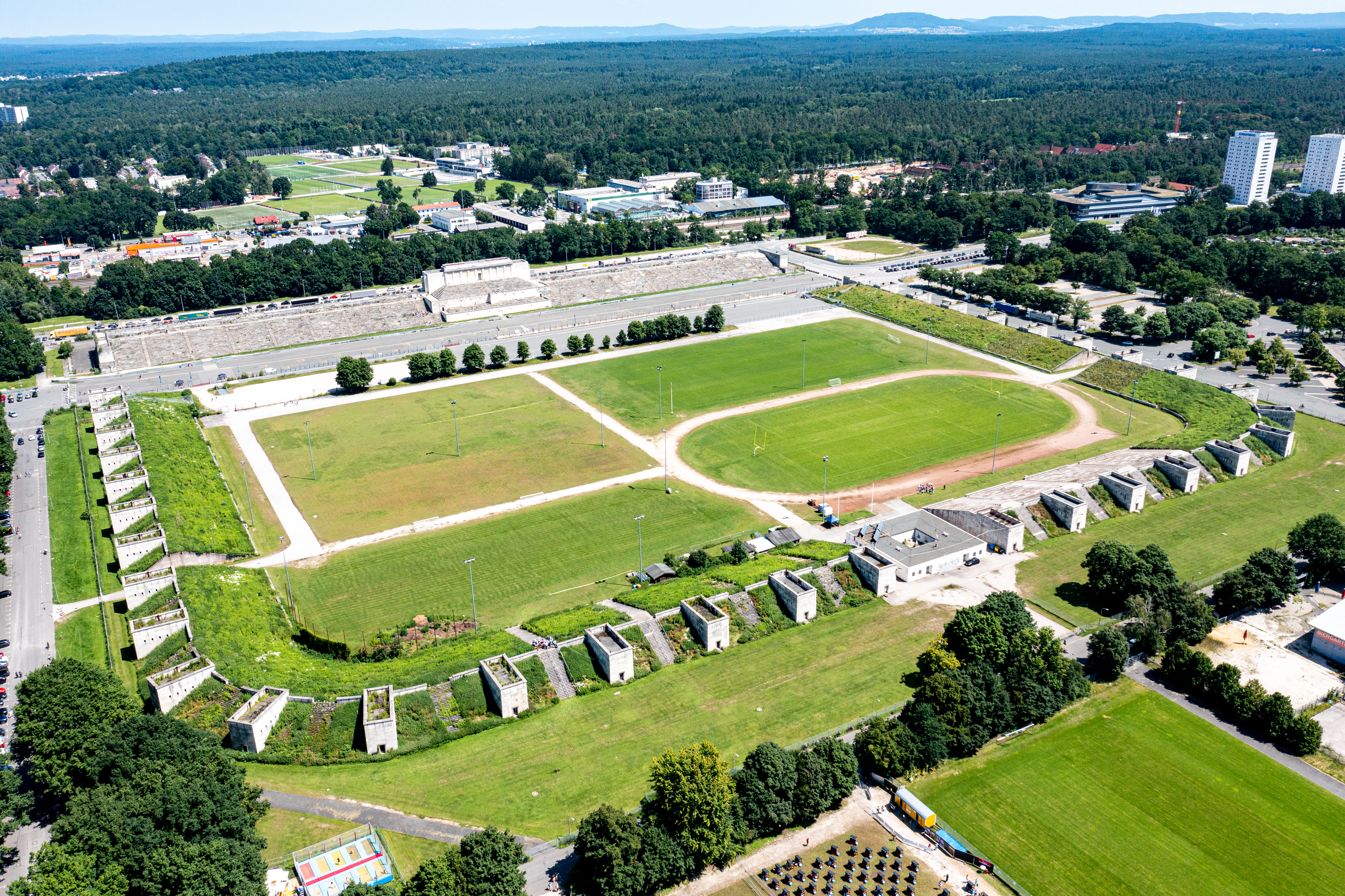
Zeppelinfeld aerial view, July 2021

=== Deutsches Stadion (German Stadium) ===
Along with his plans for the Welthauptstadt Germania ("world capital Germania"), Albert Speer made the plans for the world's largest stadium which was to be located on the rally grounds. Derived from the Panathenaic Stadium of Athens, it would have offered 400,000 seats in a horseshoe shape; planned dimensions: length: 800 metres (½ mile), width: 450 metres (¼ mile), height: 100 metres (300 feet), building area 350,000 m^{2} (86 acres).

The foundation stone was laid on 9 July 1937. It was intended to be finished for the party congress in 1945. In 1938, the construction began with the excavation. It was stopped in 1939, but during the whole war, the casting pit had to be kept dry from entering groundwater. After the war, the northern half of the pit filled up with groundwater and is today called Silbersee (Silver Lake); the southern half was used to deposit debris from downtown Nuremberg.

=== Märzfeld ===
The Märzfeld (literally: March Field, relating to the Roman god of war, Mars) was to be a representation and parade ground for the Wehrmacht. It was located at the southern end of the "Große Straße" (Great road). Its dimensions were 955 by 610 meters (1,044 yd × 667 yd) or bigger than 80 football fields. The name of the huge deployment area was supposed to recall the recovery of military sovereignty of the German Reich in March 1935. ("März" is the German name for the month "March." As in English, the name derives from the Roman warrior god Mars. The name Märzfeld thus also alludes to the Campus Martius, in Rome. The Champs de Mars in Paris take their name from the Roman landmark as well.)

The construction, never completed, began in 1938 with plans calling for 24 granite towers each about 40 meters (130 feet) in height. Only eleven were ever completed and were demolished in 1966. Tribunes for about 160,000 people were planned around the field. On the central grandstand a group of colossal statues was planned: a goddess of victory and warriors.

Today the site is occupied by a residential district, Langwasser, which also extends to the south, into the area previously used for tent cities during the party rallies.

=== KdF-Stadt (KdF-City) ===
In the north-east of the rally grounds the KdF-Stadt (KdF-City) was built. In wooden exhibition halls regional products were presented and recreational events were held during the party congresses. The NS-organisation KdF (Strength Through Joy) looked after workers during their free time.

== Rallies held by the Nazi Party ==
Party Congresses (Reichsparteitage) of the NSDAP from 1923 to 1938

Date	Location	Name
prior to the construction of the Reichsparteitagsgelände
27–29 January 1923	Munich	
3–4 July 1926	Weimar	
19–21 August 1927	Nuremberg	
1–4 August 1929	Nuremberg	
after construction of the Reichsparteitagsgelände
30 August – 3 September 1933	Nuremberg	Reichsparteitag des Sieges (Reich Party Congress of Victory); Documented in Der Sieg des Glaubens by Leni Riefenstahl
5–10 September 1934	Nuremberg	Reichsparteitag der Einheit und Stärke (Reich Party Congress of Unity and Strength); Documented in Triumph des Willens by Leni Riefenstahl
10–16 September 1935	Nuremberg	Reichsparteitag der Freiheit (Reich Party Congress of Freedom)
8–14 September 1936	Nuremberg	Reichsparteitag der Ehre (Reich Party Congress of Honour)
6–13 September 1937	Nuremberg	Reichsparteitag der Arbeit (Reich Party Congress of Work)
5–12 September 1938	Nuremberg	Reichsparteitag Großdeutschland (Reich Party Congress of Greater Germany)
2 September 1939 (canceled because of the outbreak of war)	Nuremberg	Reichsparteitag des Friedens (Reich Party Congress of Peace)

== See also ==
- Nazi architecture
