= Obereichstätt =

Coordinates: 48.8933°N 11.1340°E

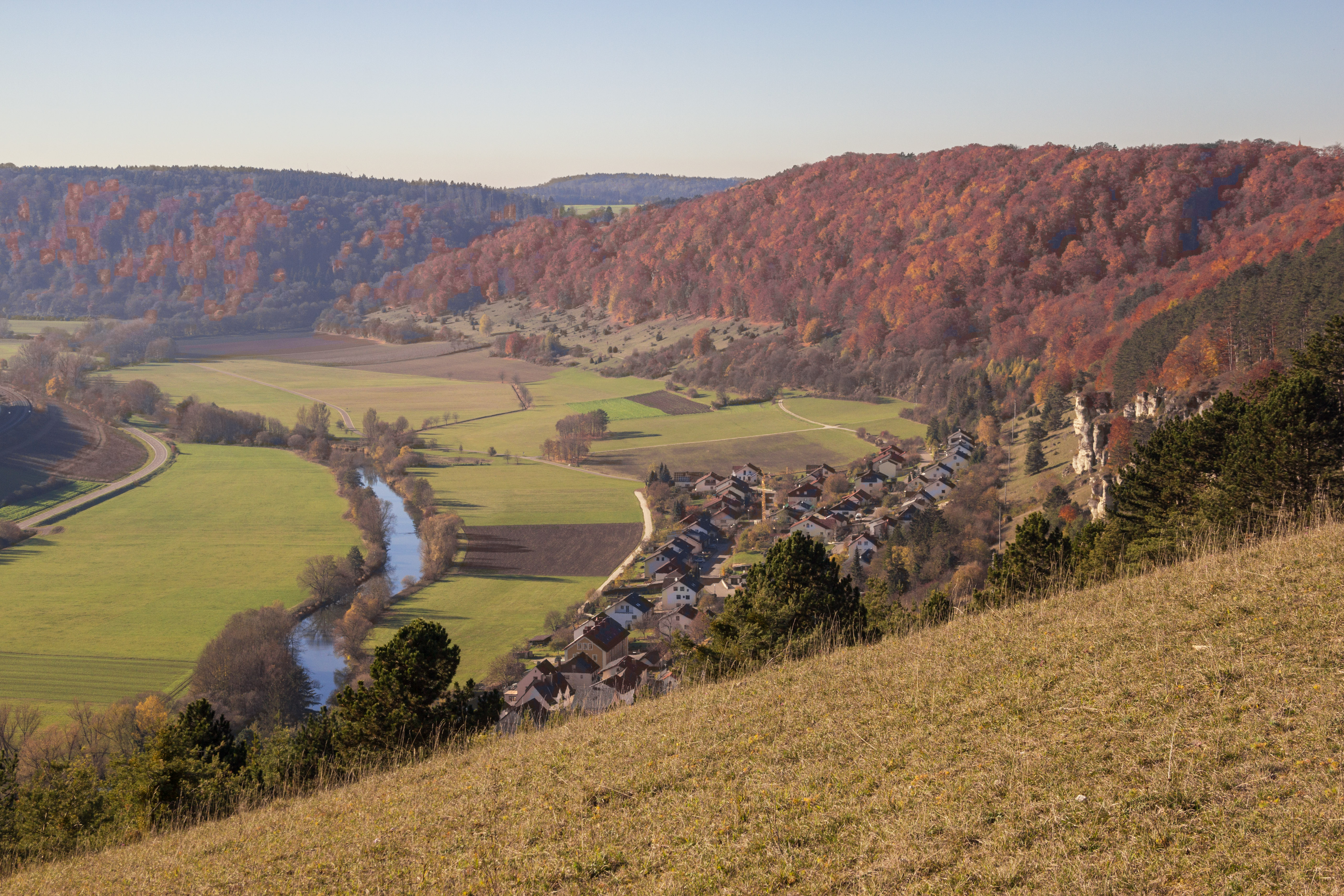
Obereichstätt

Obereichstätt is a village in the district of Eichstätt in Bavaria, administratively part of Dollnstein. It is notable mainly for the unexplained annual plague of millipedes which it suffers every autumn. Zoologists have been unable to explain the hordes of arthropods or find their source. Officials built a short metal wall to repel the millipedes in 2007.
