= Hörschbach =

River in Baden-Württemberg, Germany

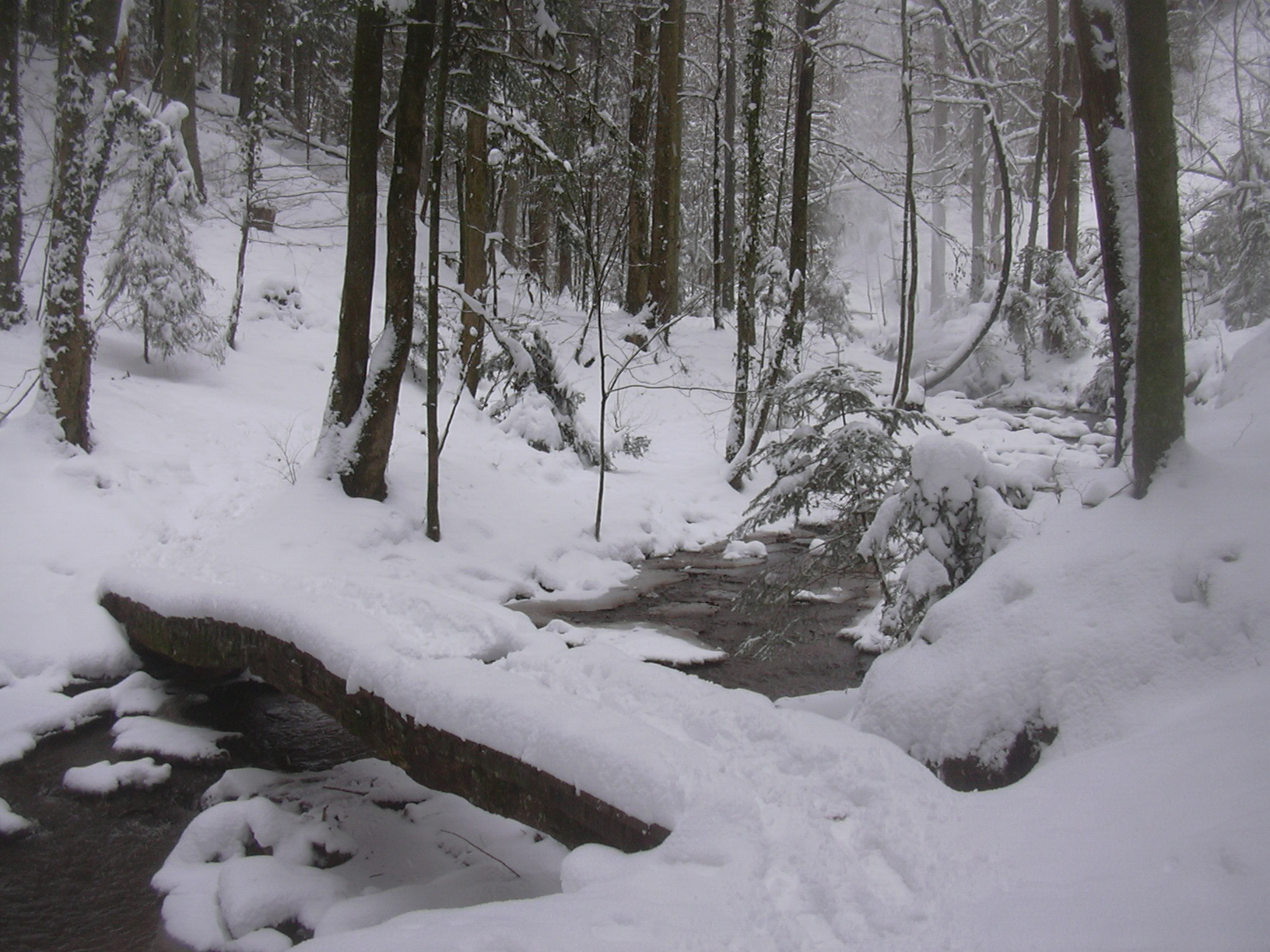

Location
- Country: Germany
- States: Baden-Württemberg

Physical characteristics
- Mouth
  - location: Murr
  - coordinates: 48.9847°N 9.5608°E

Basin features
- Progression: Murr→ Neckar→ Rhine→ North Sea

Hörschbach is a river of Baden-Württemberg, Germany. It flows into the Murr near Murrhardt.

== Geography ==
The Hörschbach rises in the southern Murrhardter Forest and runs quite steadily in a northern direction.

== See also ==
- List of rivers of Baden-Württemberg
