= Dollnstein =

- Municipality
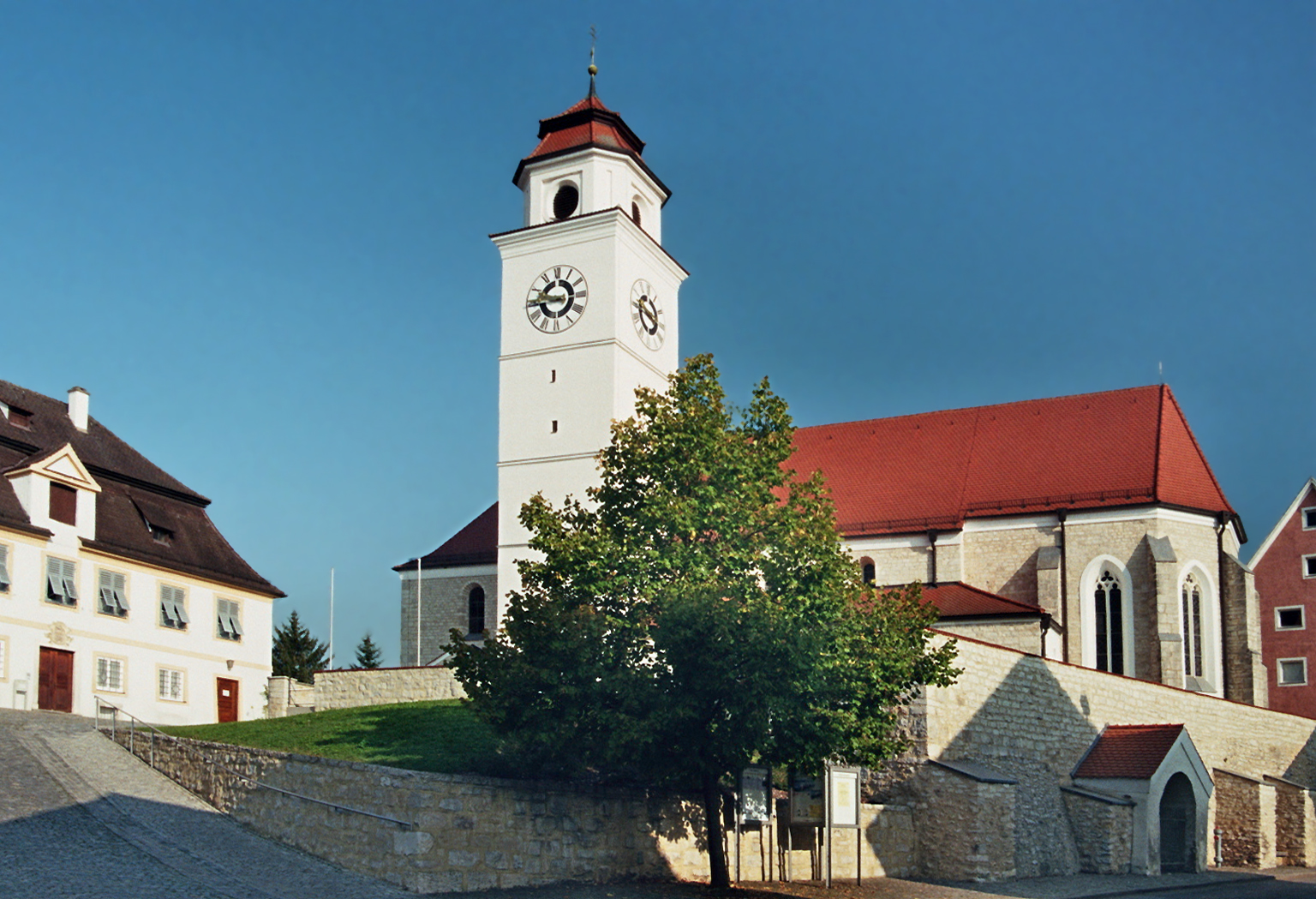
- Town hall and the Church of Saints Peter and Paul

- Coat of arms

- Location of Dollnstein within Eichstätt district
- Interactive map of Dollnstein
- Location within Germany Location within Bavaria
- Coordinates: 48°52′N 11°4′E
- Country: Germany
- State: Bavaria
- Admin. region: Oberbayern
- District: Eichstätt

Government
  - Mayor (2020–26): Wolfgang Roßkopf

Area
  - Total: 40.51 km^{2} (15.64 sq mi)
- Elevation: 395 m (1,296 ft)

Population (2025-12-31)
  - Total: 2,850
  - Density: 70.4/km^{2} (182/sq mi)
- Time zone: UTC+01:00 (CET)
  - Summer (DST): UTC+02:00 (CEST)
- Postal codes: 91795
- Dialling codes: 08422
- Vehicle registration: EI
- Website: www.dollnstein.de

Dollnstein (German pronunciation: [ˈdɔlnʃtaɪn]) is a municipality in the district of Eichstätt in Bavaria in Germany. The name Dollnstein has its origins in Middle High German "Tollunstein".

== History ==
Dollnstein was first mentioned in 1007 as a tiny village named Tollenstein. The castle of Dollnstein was built probably in the mid of the 12th century from the counts von Hirschberg.

Since the 13th century the village was a market for the exchange of goods. From 1440 onwards the village was related to Eichstätt and an administration and judicial authority was located in Dollnstein.

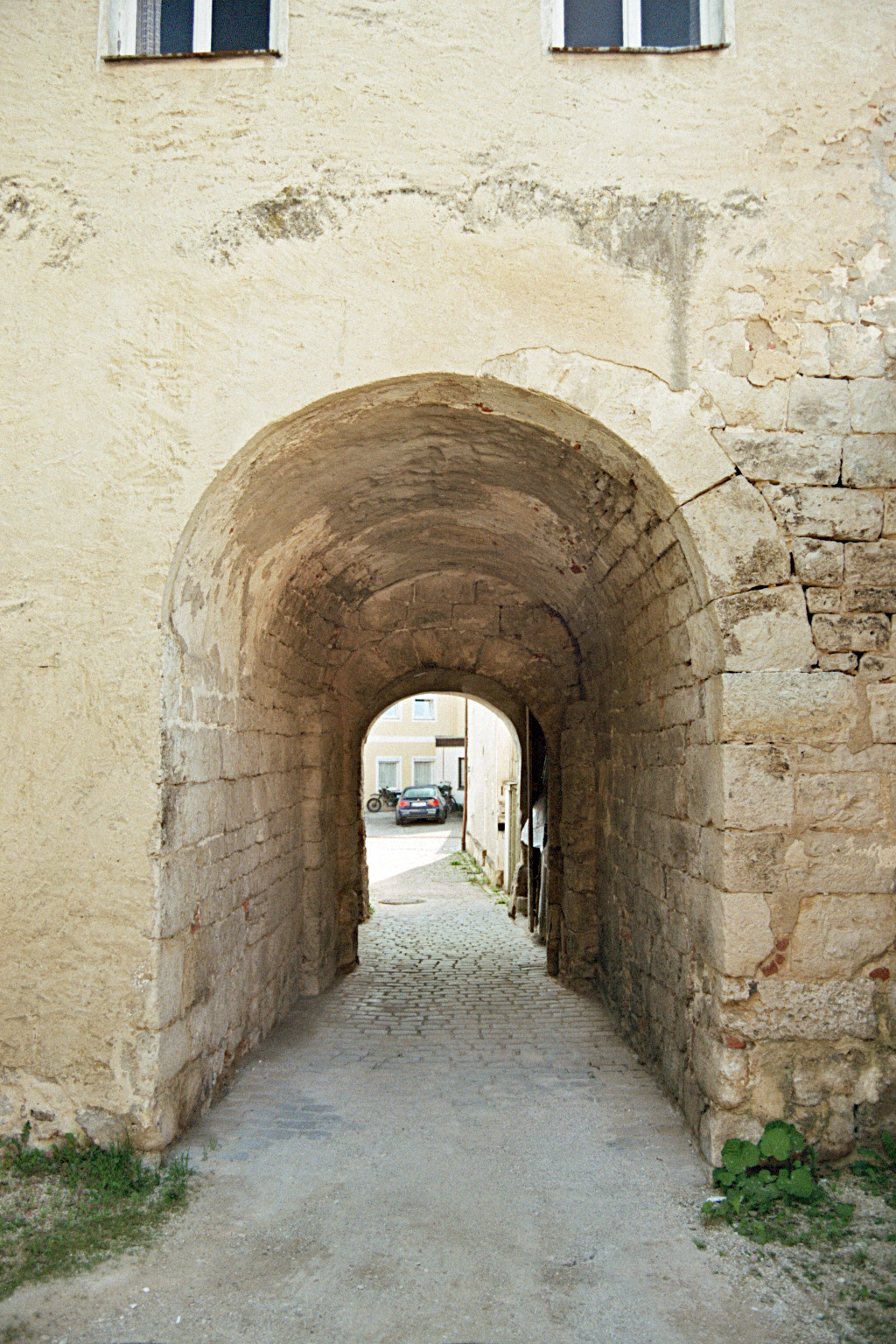
Entrance of the historic Unterburg

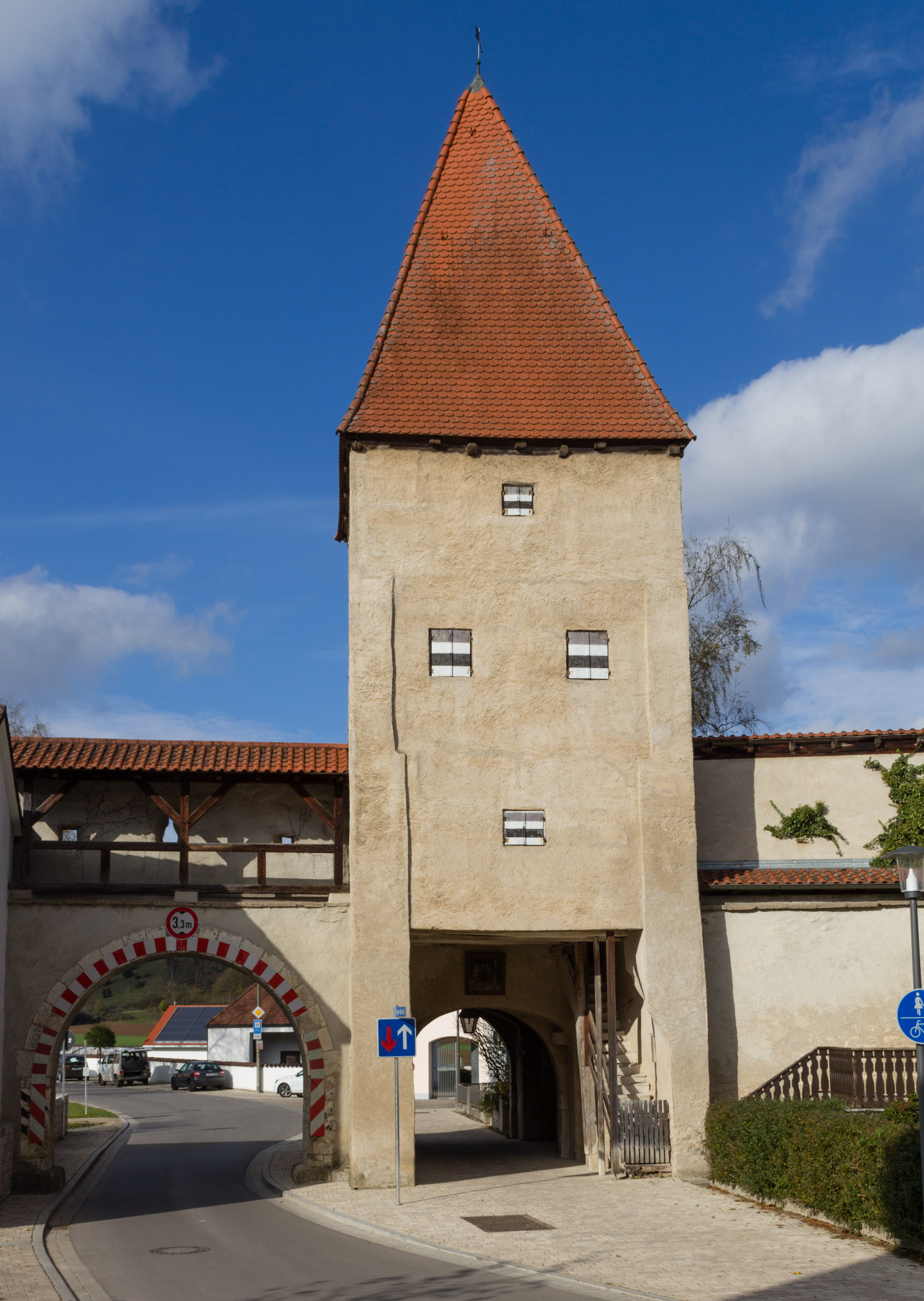
Market view from south (2017)

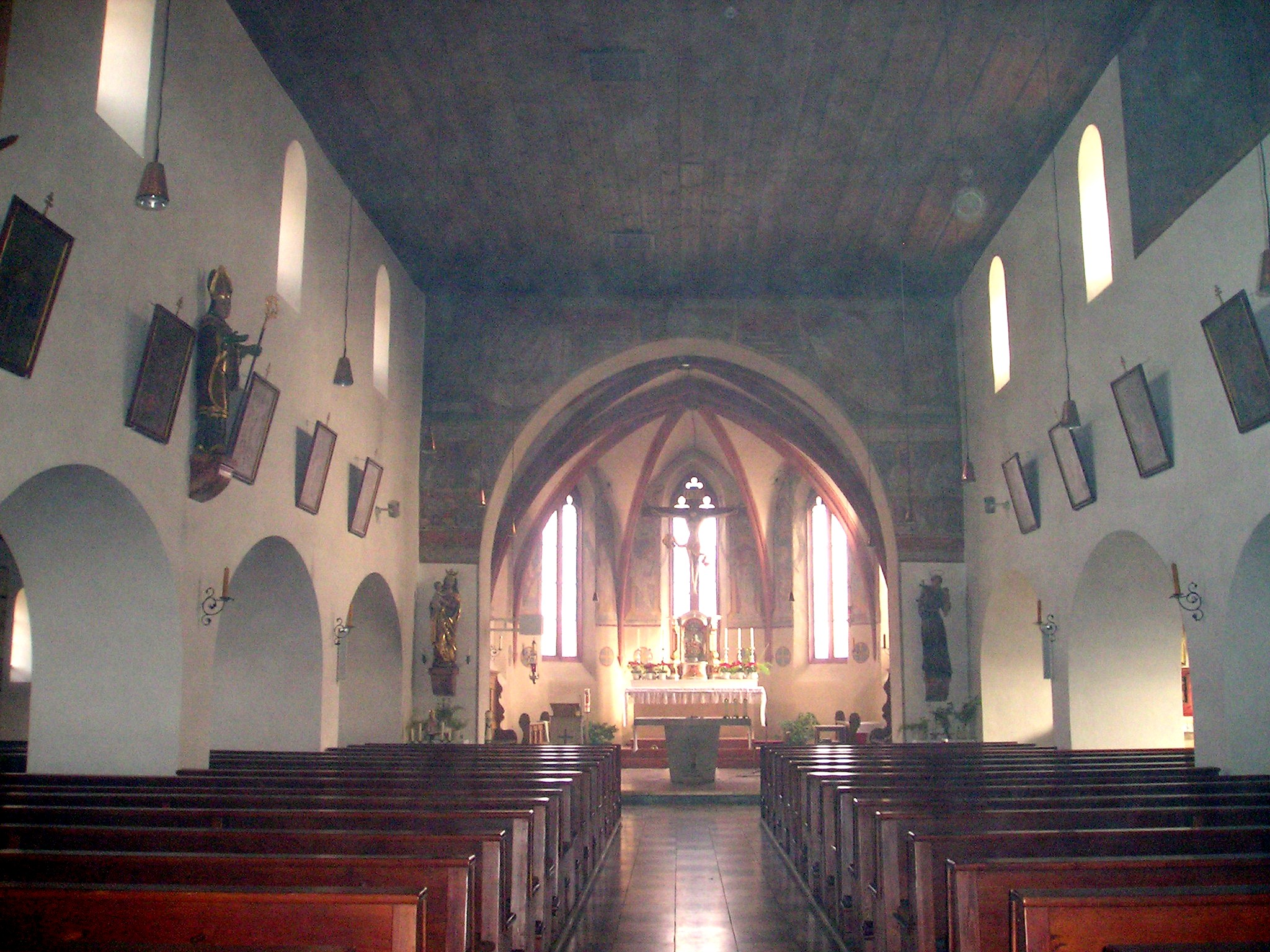
View into the church

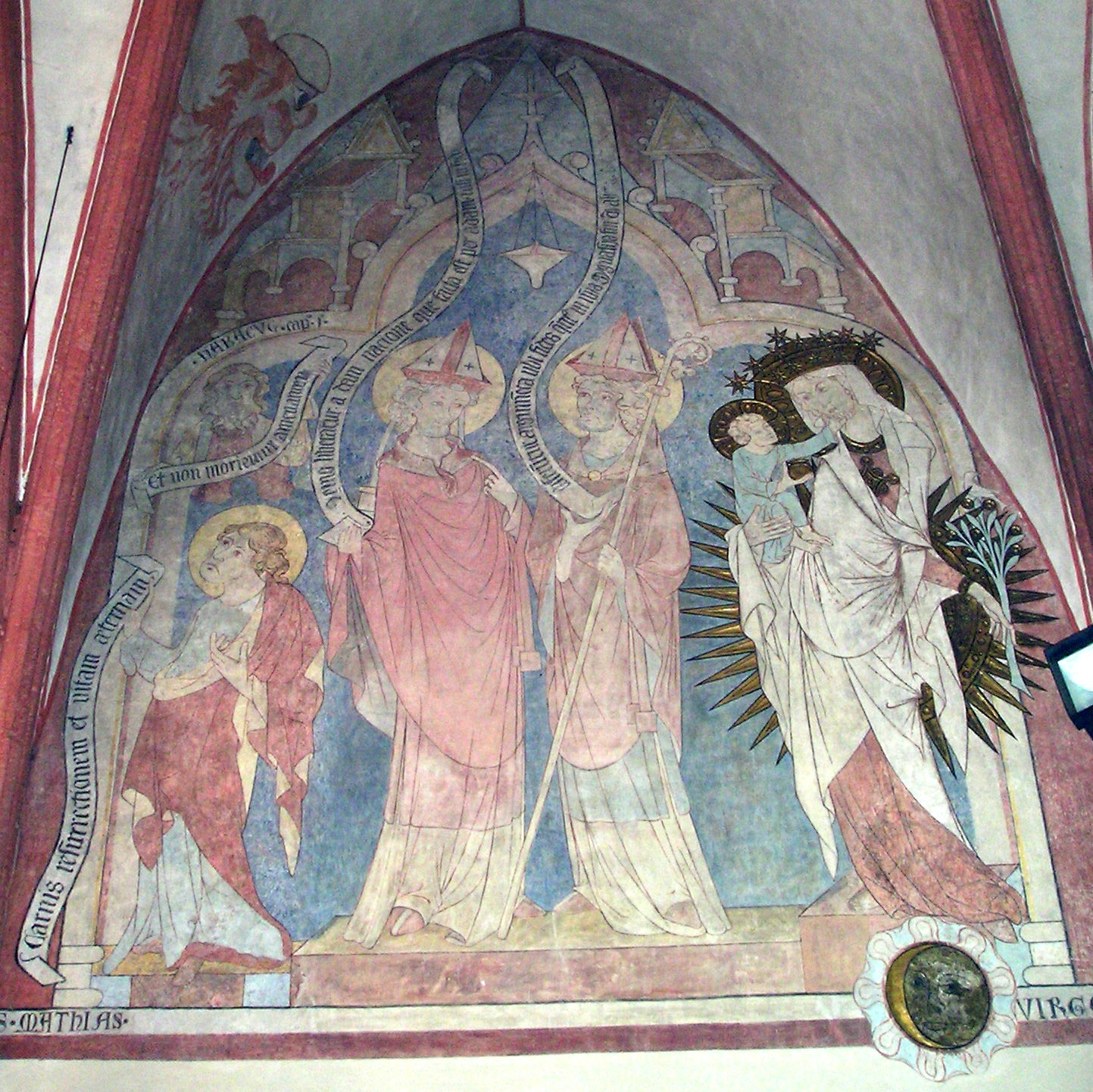
Fresco at the choir room

== Personalities ==
=== Honorary citizen ===
- Ludwig Körner (1915-2012), Catholic priest

=== Sons and daughters of the city ===
- Ludwig Ruff (1878-1934), architect
- Erich Zenger (1939-2010), Ordinarius for the Old Testament at the University of Münster
- Gisela Schneeberger (born 1948), cabaret artist and actress
