= Sulzbach an der Murr =

German municipality

- Municipality
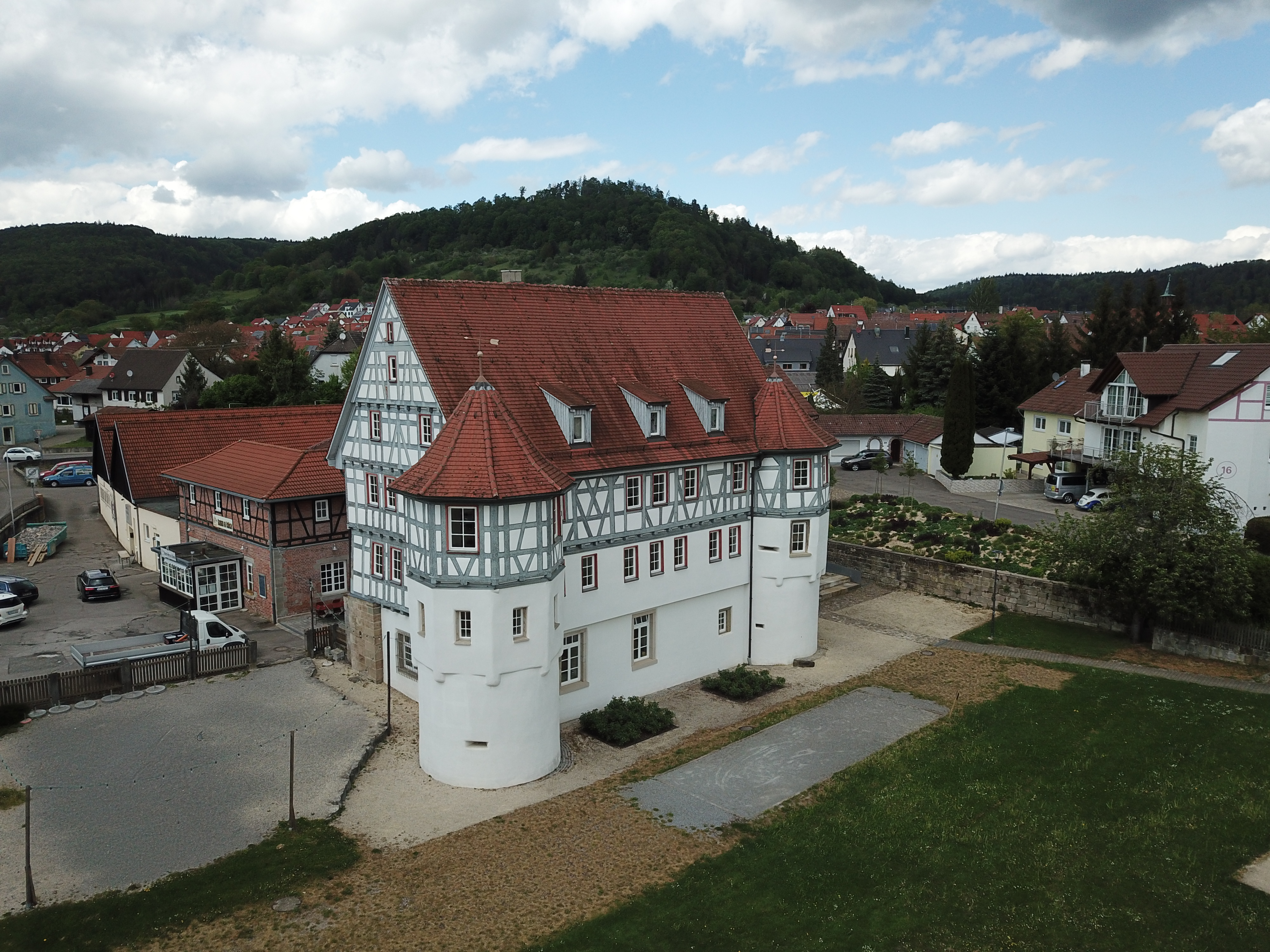
- Lautereck Castle

- Flag Coat of arms

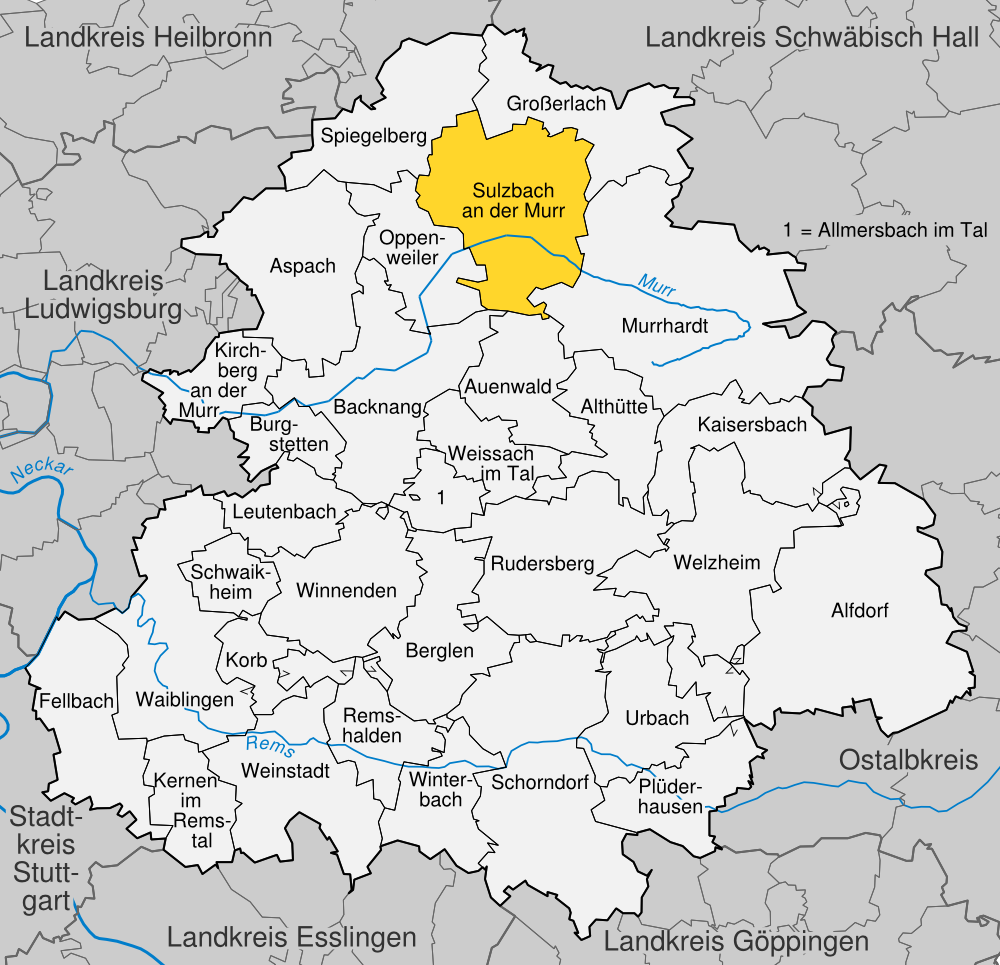
- Location of Sulzbach an der Murr within Rems-Murr-Kreis district
- Interactive map of Sulzbach an der Murr
- Location within Germany Location within Baden-Württemberg
- Coordinates: 49°00′16″N 09°30′20″E
- Country: Germany
- State: Baden-Württemberg
- Admin. region: Stuttgart
- District: Rems-Murr-Kreis

Government
  - Mayor (2023–31): Veronika Holz

Area
  - Total: 40.11 km^{2} (15.49 sq mi)
- Elevation: 273 m (896 ft)

Population (2025-12-31)
  - Total: 5,355
  - Density: 133.5/km^{2} (345.8/sq mi)
- Time zone: UTC+01:00 (CET)
  - Summer (DST): UTC+02:00 (CEST)
- Postal codes: 71560
- Dialling codes: 07193
- Vehicle registration: WN, BK
- Website: www.sulzbach-murr.de

Sulzbach an der Murr (German pronunciation: [ˈsʊlt͡sbaç ˈʔan dɛːɐ̯ ˈmʊɐ̯], lit. 'Sulzbach on the Murr'; English: Sulzbach upon Murr) is a market and resort town in the district of Rems-Murr in Baden-Württemberg, Germany. It is part of the Region Stuttgart and the Stuttgart Metropolitan Region.

== History ==
Sulzbach an der Murr was a possession of the County of Löwenstein from the Middle Ages to 1867, when the House of Löwenstein-Wertheim finally lost control of Sulzbach.

== Geography ==
The municipality (Gemeinde) of Sulzbach an der Murr is located in the Rems-Murr district, in the German state of Baden-Württemberg. Sulzbach's municipal area is physically located in the between the Löwenstein Hills and Murrhardt Forest, regions of the greater Swabian-Franconian Forest. Elevation above sea level in the municipal area ranges from a high of 585 meters (1,919 ft) Normalnull (NN) to a low of 259 meters (850 ft) NN.

== Politics ==
Sulzbach has one borough (Ortsteil), Sulzbach an der Murr, and 17 villages: Bartenbach, Berwinkel, Bushof, Eschelhof, Eschenstruet, Gronbachmühle, Hager, Hammer, Harrenberg, Haselbachmühle, Ittenberg, Kleinhöchberg, Lautern, Liemannsklinge, Schleißweiler, Siebersbach, and Zwerenberg. The abandoned villages of Alte Sägmühle, Einsiedel, Wüste Mühl are located in Sulzbach's municipal area.

=== Coat of arms ===
Sulzbach's coat of arms is divided party per fess into an upper, yellow half containing a lion in red facing to the left, and a lower, blue half containing a white fish. The red lion is taken from the arms of Löwenstein-Wertheim while the fish is a reference to Sulzbach's abundance of waterways. This coat of arms has been used since 1650 in town seals since 1650. On 18 February 1981, the Rems-Murr district office issued a municipal flag to Sulzbach.

== Transportation ==
Sulzbach an der Murr is connected to Germany's network of roadways by the Bundesstraße 14 and its system of railways by the Waiblingen–Schwäbisch Hall railway. Local public transportation is provided by the Verkehrs- und Tarifverbund Stuttgart.
