= Heilbronn Hills =

Heilbronn Hills Heilbronner Berge
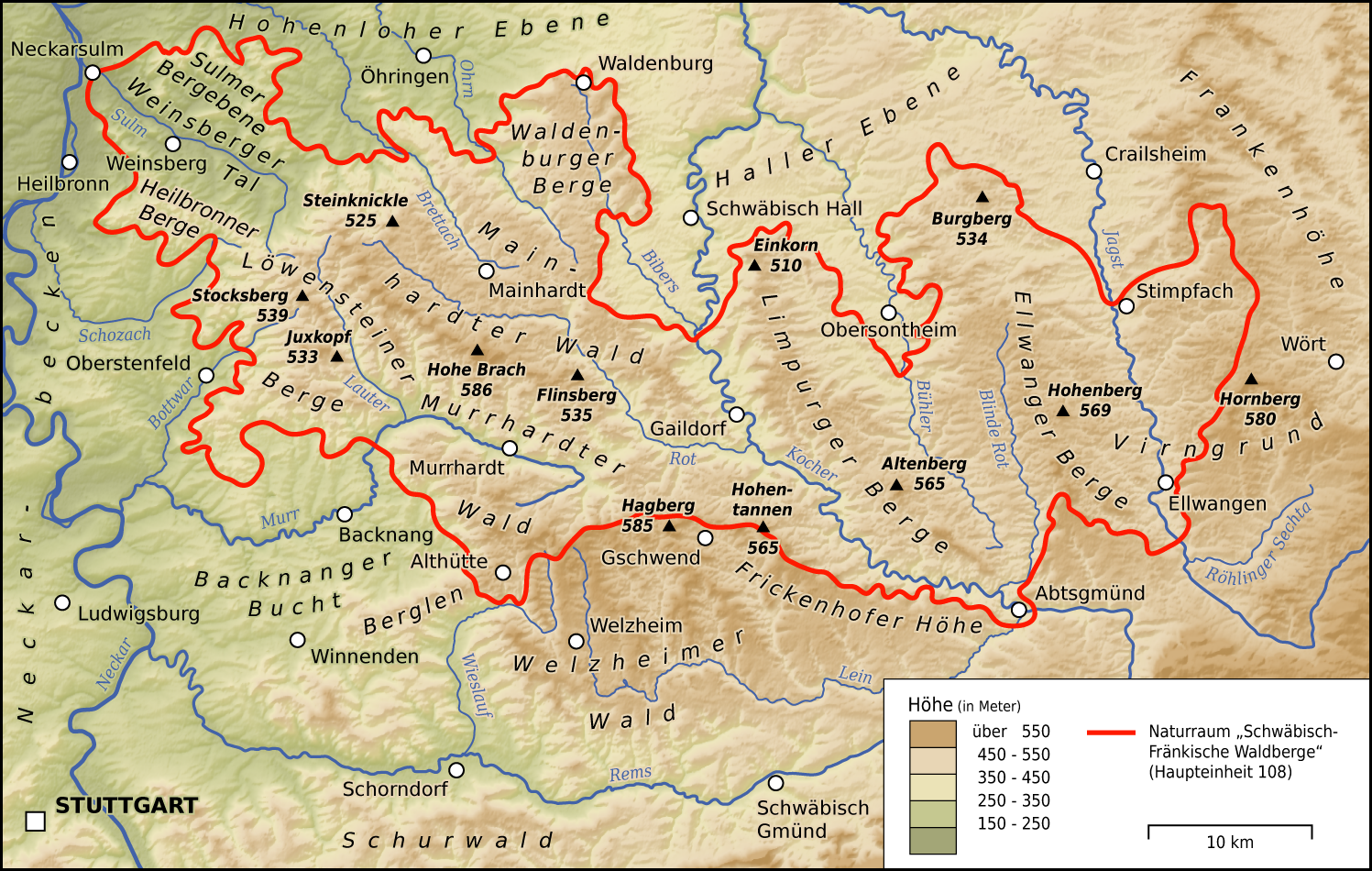
- The Heilbronn Hills in the west-northwest of the natural region of the Swabian-Franconian Forest

Highest point
- Peak: Reisberg
- Elevation: 378 m above NHN

Geography
- State(s): Heilbronn and Heilbronn county; Baden-Württemberg, Germany
- Range coordinates: 49°06′59″N 9°17′50″E
- Parent range: Lowenstein Hills im Swabian-Franconian Forest

Geology
- Orogeny: Bergland
- Rock type: Keuper

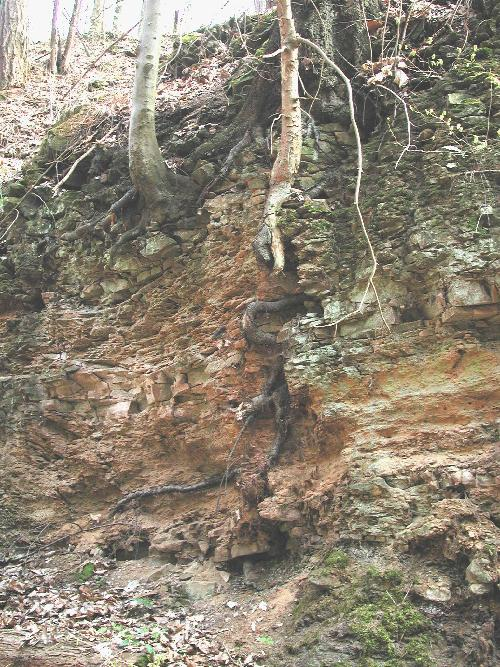
Heilbronn Sandstone

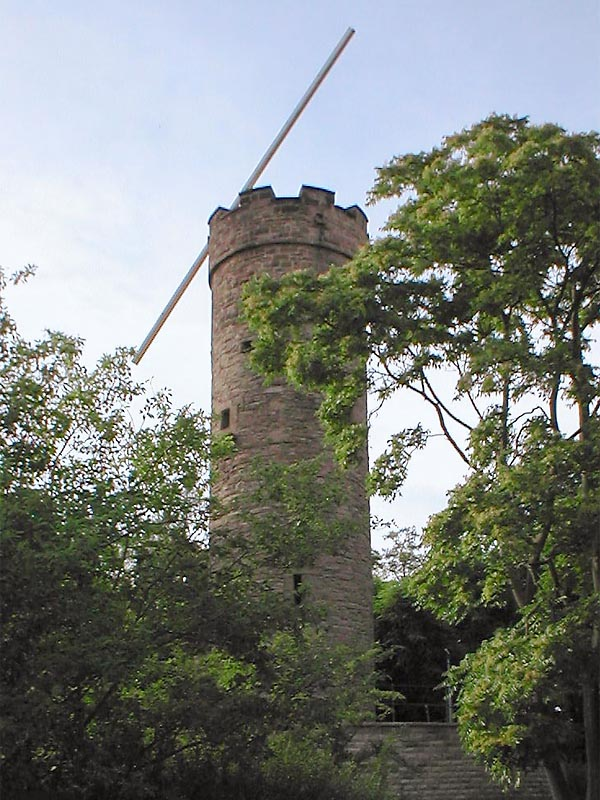
Wartberg Tower of the Wartberg

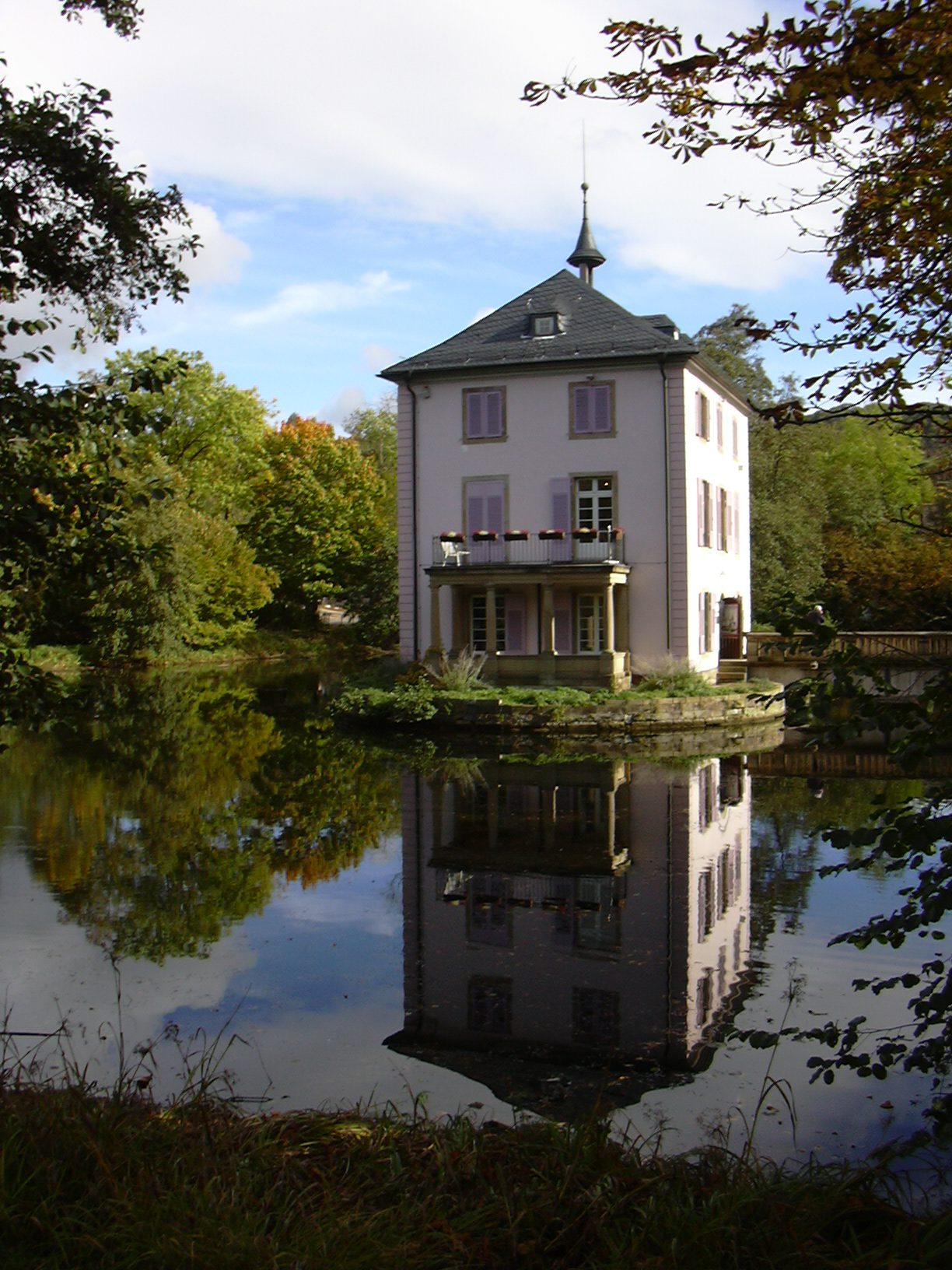
The Trappenseeschlösschen

The Heilbronn Hills (German: Heilbronner Berge) in the borough of Heilbronn with foothills in the county of Heilbronn are the northwestern outliers of the Lowenstein Hills in the south German state of Baden-Württemberg and reach a height of 378 m above sea level (NHN). Together with the Sulm Plateau to the northeast they are often known as the Heilbronn Uplands (Heilbronner Bergland).

== Geography ==
=== Location ===
The Heilbronn Hills forms the northwestern foothills of the Löwenstein Hills in the west-northwestern part of the Swabian-Franconian Forest. The region extends from north to south, bulging eastwards in a sickle-shape around the city of Heilbronn. In the north and northeast it is bounded by the valley of Weinsberger Tal on the far side of which is the Sulm Plateau. To the east on the other side of the valley of the Stadtseebach (Saubach) are the west-northwest foothills of the Mainhardt Forest, to the southeast the range transitions into the Lowenstein Hills themselves and in the southwest, west and northwest they descend in keuper escarpments into the Neckar Basin.

Villages dot the edges of the Heilbronn Hills, many, especially those in the borough of Heilbronn, extending into the hills: Erlenbach and Weinsberg in the north, Lehrensteinsfeld (further away) in the east, Obergruppenbach in the southeast, Untergruppenbach in the south, Flein and Sontheim in the southwest, Heilbronn in the west and Neckarsulm in the northwest.

=== Natural regions ===
From a natural region perspective, the Heilbronn Hills (No. 108.13) with the Weinsberger Tal (108.12) and the Sulmer Bergebene (108.11) are part of the Lowenstein Hills (108.1) within the Swabian Keuper-Lias Plains (10) and Swabian-Franconian Forest (108).

=== Hills ===
The high points of the Heilbronn Hills included the following – sorted by height in metres (m) above sea level (NHN; unless otherwise stated according to the):

- Reisberg (378.0 m), 1.5 km north-northeast of the Heilbronn village of Obergruppenbach
- Schweinsberg (372.8 m), 1.5 km northwest of the Heilbronn village of Donnbronn
- Hintersberg (364.5 m), 1.6 km northwest of Obergruppenbach
- Dornberg (344.5 m), 0.8 km northwest of Obergruppenbach
- Wartberg (313.3 m), 2.3 km northeast of Heilbronn's city centre
- Galgenberg (ca. 312 m), 3.8 km east of Heilbronn's city centre
- Staufenberg (300.7 m), 1.5 km northeast of the Heilbronn village of Flein
- Büchelberg (293.0 m), 3.5 km southeast of Heilbronn's city centre
- Gaffenberg (278.1 m), ca. 3 km southeast of Heilbronn's city centre
- Stiftsberg (255.4 m), ca. 3 km north-northeast of Heilbronn's city centre
- Hagelsberg (265.5 m), 1 km north-northeast of Flein

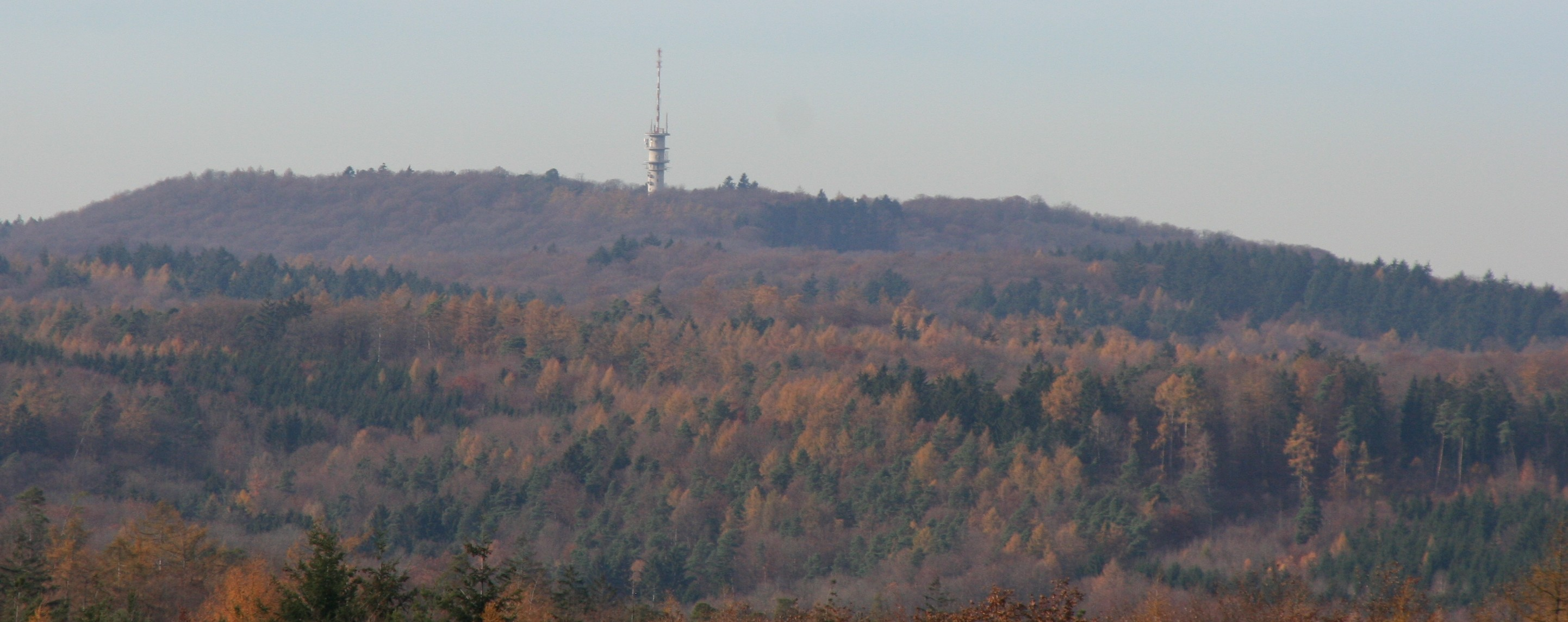
View from Untergruppenbach-Vorhof in the east-southeast looking towards the Schweinsberg and Heilbronn TV Tower

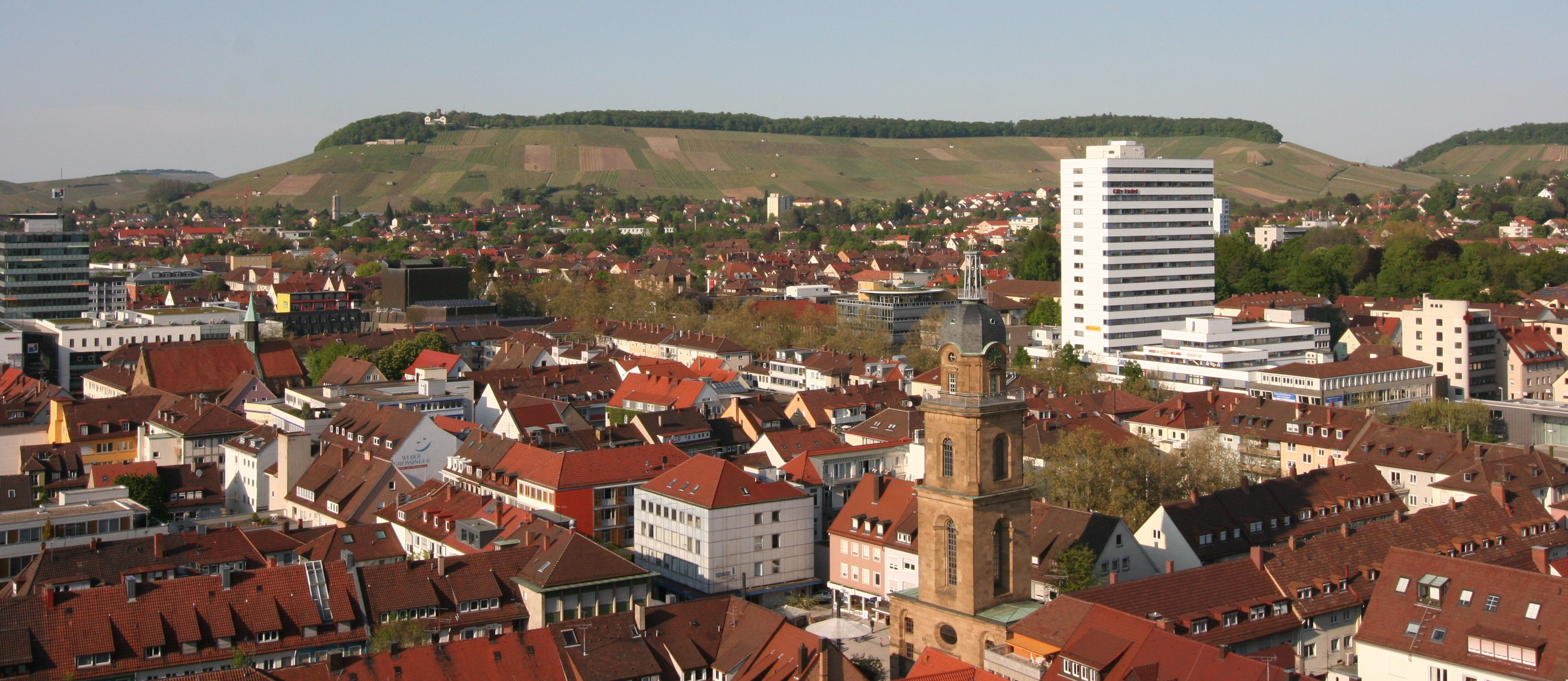
View of the Wartberg from the west tower of St. Kilian's Church

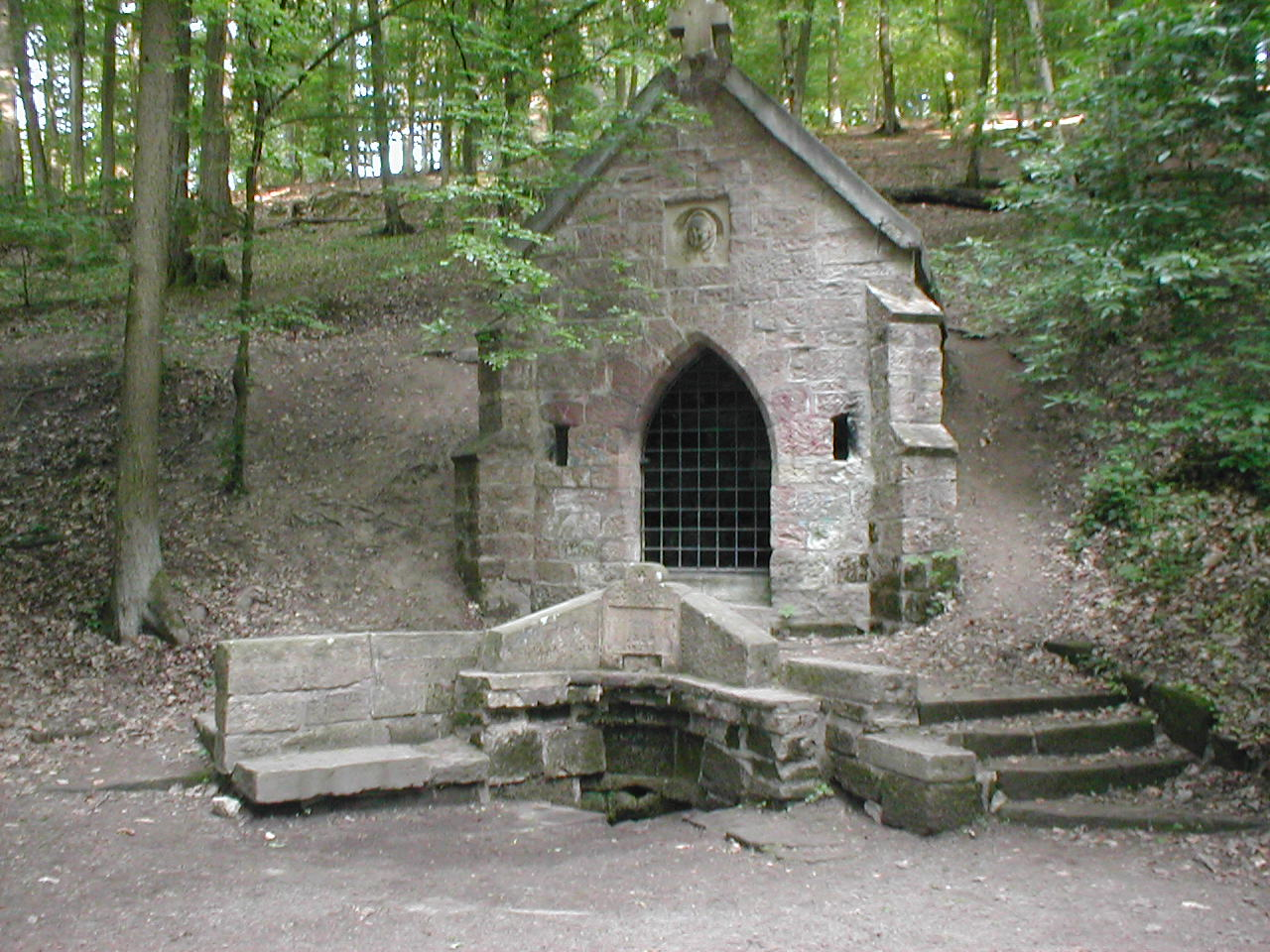
The Köpferbrunnenanlage spring

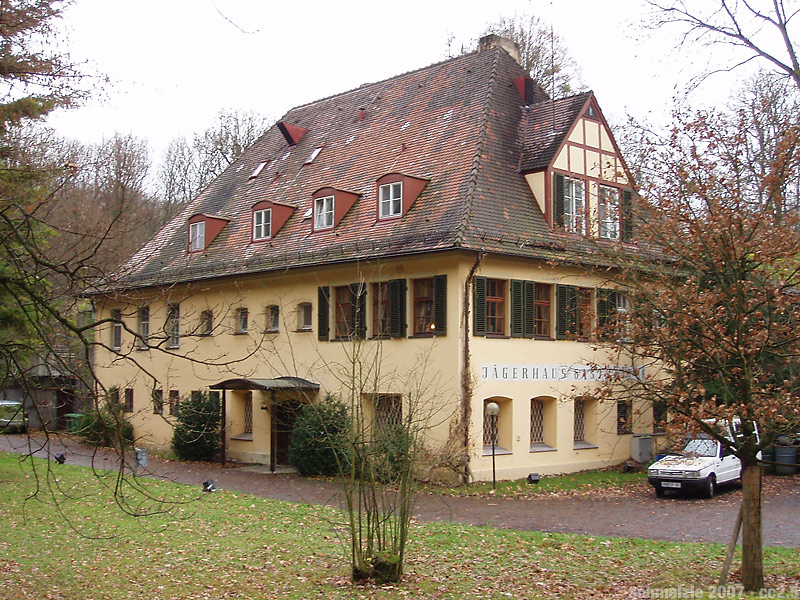
Forest inn of Jägerhaus
