= Wartberg (Heilbronn) =

Mountain in Baden-Württemberg, Germany

Coordinates: 49°09′35″N 9°14′06″E

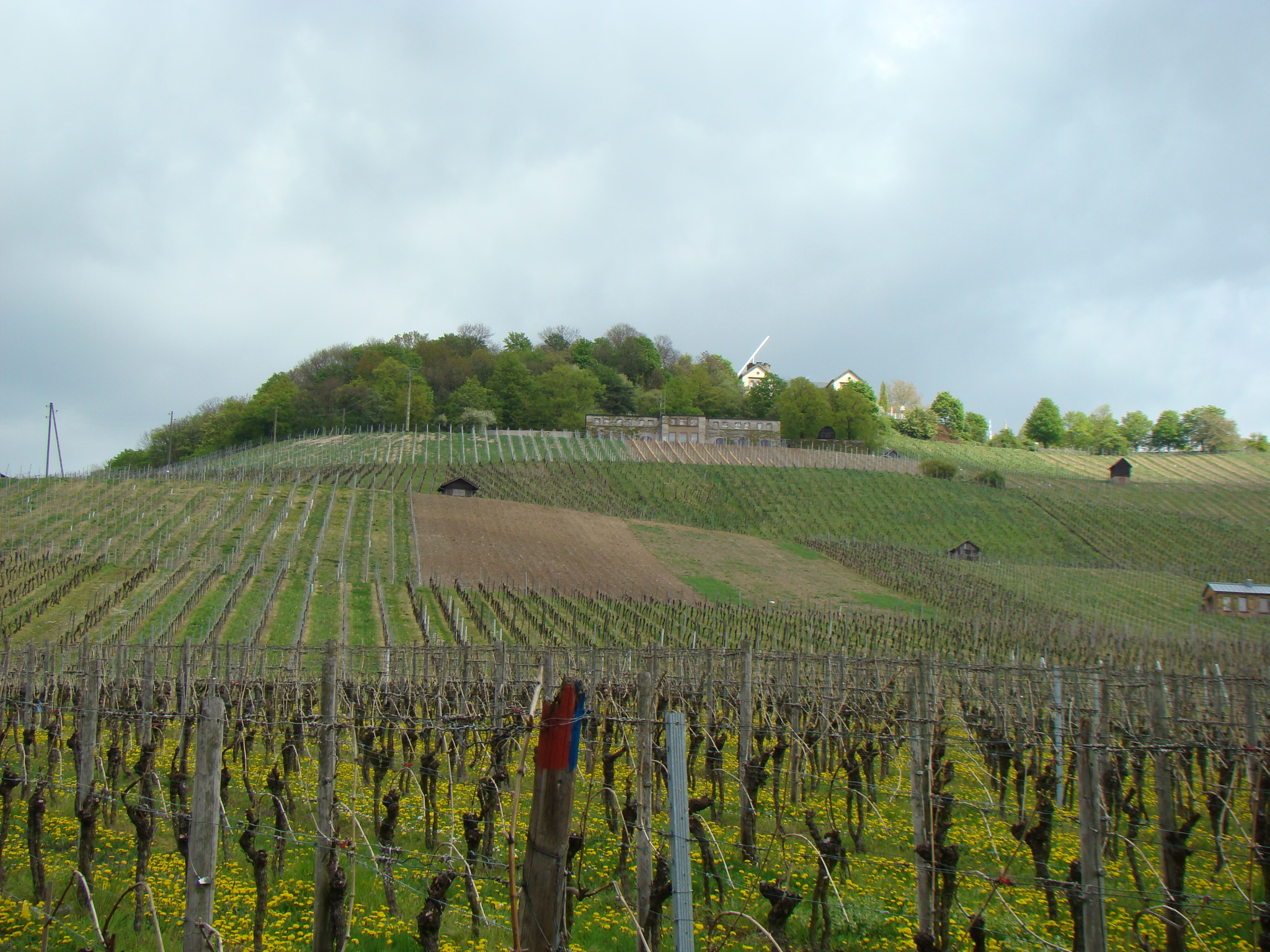

Highest point
- Elevation: 307.6 m (1,009 ft)

Geography
- Location: Baden-Württemberg, Germany

The Wartberg is a hill in Baden-Württemberg, Germany.
