= Schweinsberg (hill) =

Mountain in Baden-Württemberg, Germany

Coordinates: 49.1108°N 9.2497°E

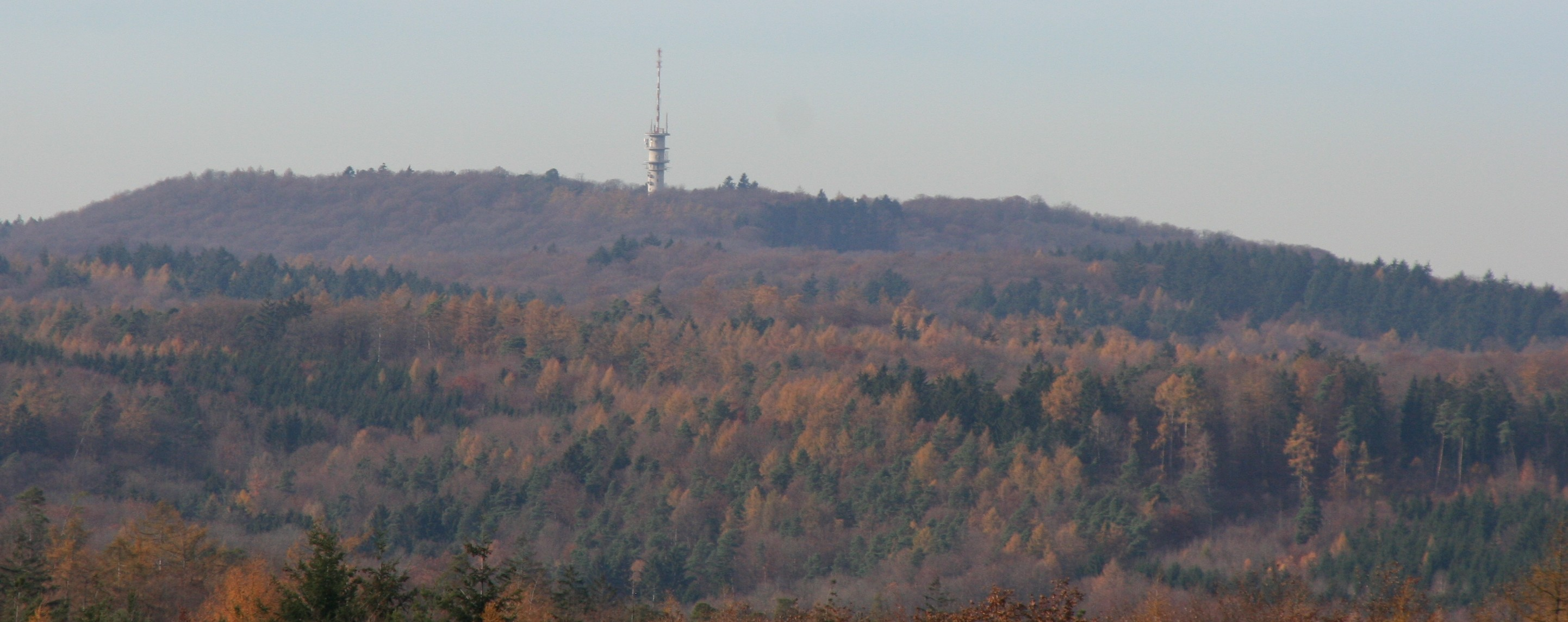
- View from Untergruppenbach forecourt to the Schweinsberg.

Highest point
- Elevation: 372.8 m (1,223 ft)

Geography
- Location: Baden-Württemberg, Germany

Schweinsberg is a hill of Baden-Württemberg, Germany.
