= Hörnle =

Hörnle may refer to:

- Hörnle (Swabian Jura), mountain in the Swabian Jura, near Dettingen an der Erms, county of Reutlingen, Baden-Württemberg
- Hörnleberg or the Hörnle, a mountain in the Black Forest, near Gutach im Breisgau, county of Emmendingen
- Hörnle (Ammergau Alps), a mountain in the Ammergau Alps
- Hörnle (Bollschweil), a mountain of Baden-Württemberg
- Hörnle (Münstertal), a mountain of Baden-Württemberg
- Hörnle, the eastern tip of the Bodanrück peninsula in Lake Constance
