= Hörnle (Swabian Jura) =

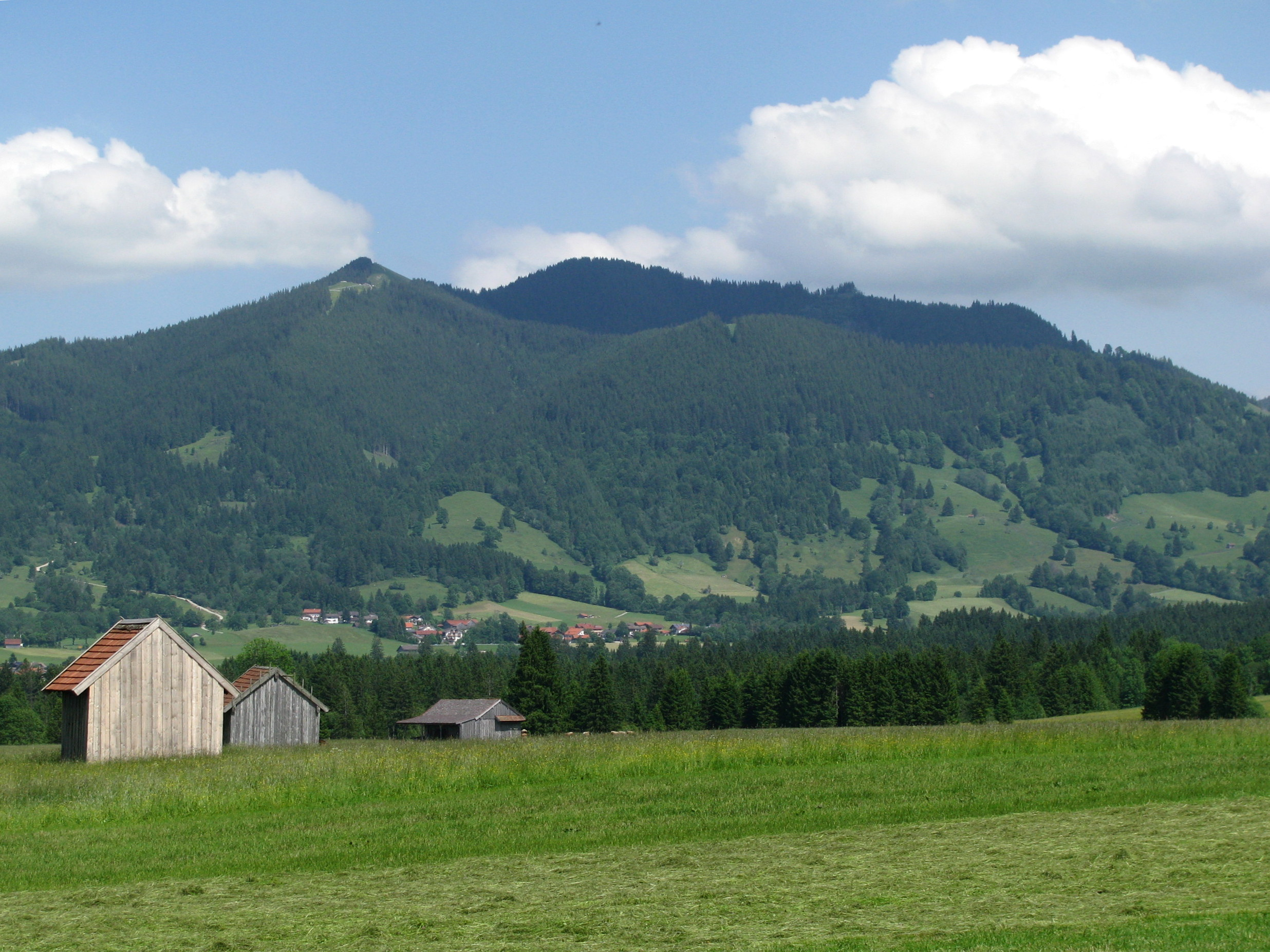
- The mountain from the west

Highest point
- Elevation: 707 m (2,320 ft)
- Coordinates: 48°32′35″N 09°21′16″E

Geography
- Location within Baden-Württemberg
- Location: Baden-Württemberg, Germany

The Hörnle (German pronunciation: [ˈhœʁnlə]) is a mountain in Baden-Württemberg, Germany.
