= Reutlingen (Landtag electoral district) =

State electoral district of Germany

60: Reutlingen-Donaueschingen
- Electoral district for the Landtag of Baden-Württemberg
- Reutlingen-Donaueschingen in 2026
- District: Reutlingen and Tübingen
- Electorate: 125,352 (2026)
- Major settlements: Pfullingen, Pliezhausen, Reutlingen, Walddorfhäslach, Wannweil, Dußlingen, Gomaringen, Kirchentellinsfurt, Kusterdingen, and Nehren

Current electoral district
- Party: CDU
- Member: Maximilian Menton

Reutlingen-Donaueschingen is an electoral constituency (German: Wahlkreis) represented in the Landtag of Baden-Württemberg. Since 2026, it has elected one member via first-past-the-post voting. Voters cast a second vote under which additional seats are allocated proportionally state-wide. Under the constituency numbering system, it is designated as constituency 60. It is split between the districts of Reutlingen and Tübingen.

== Geography ==
The constituency consists of:

- The municipalities of Pfullingen, Pliezhausen, Reutlingen, Walddorfhäslach, and Wannweil, within the district of Reutlingen.
- The municipalities of Dußlingen, Gomaringen, Kirchentellinsfurt, Kusterdingen, and Nehren, within the district of Tübingen.

There were 125,352 eligible voters in 2026.

== Members ==
=== First mandate ===
Both prior to and since the electoral reforms for the 2026 election, the winner of the plurality of the vote (first-past-the-post) in every constituency won the first mandate.

| Election | Member | Party | % |
|---|---|---|---|
| 1976 | Erich Walter Barthold | CDU | |
| 1980 | Hermann Schaufler | CDU | |
| 1984 | Hermann Schaufler | CDU | |
| 1988 | Hermann Schaufler | CDU | |
| 1992 | Hermann Schaufler | CDU | |
| 1996 | Hermann Schaufler | CDU | |
| 2001 | Dieter Hillebrand | CDU | 42.1 |
| 2006 | Dieter Hillebrand | CDU | 41.1 |
| 2011 | Dieter Hillebrand | CDU | 36.3 |
| 2016 | Thomas Poreski | Grüne | 31.2 |
| 2021 | Thomas Poreski | Grüne | 36.2 |
| 2026 | Maximilian Menton | CDU | 34.0 |

=== Second mandate ===
Prior to the electoral reforms for the 2026 election, the seats in the state parliament were allocated proportionately amongst parties which received more than 5% of valid votes across the state. The seats that were won proportionally for parties that did not win as many first mandates as seats they were entitled to, were allocated to their candidates which received the highest proportion of the vote in their respective constituencies. This meant that following some elections, a constituency would have one or more members elected under a second mandate.

Prior to 2011, these second mandates were allocated to the party candidates who got the greatest number of votes, whilst from 2011-2021, these were allocated according to percentage share of the vote.

| Election | Member | Party | Member | Party | Member | Party |
|---|---|---|---|---|---|---|
| 1976 | Gerhard Noller | SPD | | | | |
| 1980 | Kark Guhl | SPD | | | | |
| 1984 | Karl Weingärtner | SPD | | | | |
| 1988 | Karl Weingärtner | SPD | | | | |
| 1992 | Karl Weingärtner | SPD | Manfred Renz | Grüne | | |
| 1996 | Rudolf Hausmann | SPD | Annemie Renz | Grüne | Hagen Kluck | FDP |
| 2001 | Rudolf Hausmann | SPD | | | | |
| 2006 | Rudolf Hausmann | SPD | | | Hagen Kluck | FDP |
| 2011 | Nils Schmid | SPD | Thomas Poreski | Grüne | | |
| 2016 | Nils Schmid | SPD | | | | |
| Oct 2017 | Ramazan Selçuk | SPD | | | | |
| 2021 | | | | | | |

== Election results ==
=== 2026 election ===
State election (2026): Reutlingen
| Notes: | Blue background denotes the winner of the electorate vote. Pink background denotes a candidate elected from their party list. Yellow background denotes an electorate win by a list member, or other incumbent. A ✓ or ✗ denotes status of any incumbent, win or lose respectively. | | | | | | |
| Party | Candidate | Votes | % | ±% | Party votes | % | ±% |
|---|---|---|---|---|---|---|---|
| CDU | Maximilian Menton | 30,880 | 34.0 | ▲12.0 | 25,611 | 28.1 | ▲6.1 |
| Greens | ✗ Thomas Poreski | 26,520 | 29.2 | ▼7.0 | 31,388 | 34.4 | ▼1.7 |
| AfD | Maximilian Gerner | 15,249 | 16.8 | ▲7.3 | 15,560 | 17.1 | ▲7.6 |
| SPD | Ronja Nothofer-Hahn | 6,983 | 7.7 | ▼2.5 | 4,571 | 5.0 | ▼5.2 |
| Left | Jessica Knapp | 5,147 | 5.7 | ▲2.0 | 4,165 | 4.6 | ▲0.9 |
| FDP | Sebastian Geyer | 3,303 | 3.6 | ▼7.7 | 3,780 | 4.1 | ▼7.2 |
| BSW | Günter Herbig | 1,795 | 2.0 | | 1,665 | 1.8 | |
| FW | | | | | 1,250 | 1.4 | ▼0.6 |
| APT | | | | | 801 | 0.9 | |
| Volt | | | | | 642 | 0.7 | ▲0.2 |
| PARTEI | | | | | 431 | 0.5 | ▼0.9 |
| ÖDP | Matthias Dietrich | 469 | 0.5 | ▼0.2 | 172 | 0.2 | ▼0.5 |
| Bündnis C | Joachim Maigler | 427 | 0.5 | | 258 | 0.3 | |
| Pensioners | | | | | 183 | 0.2 | |
| Values | | | | | 165 | 0.2 | |
| dieBasis | | | | | 162 | 0.2 | ▼0.7 |
| Team Todenhöfer | | | | | 128 | 0.1 | |
| PdF | | | | | 63 | 0.1 | |
| Verjüngungsforschung | | | | | 61 | 0.1 | |
| Humanists | | | | | 40 | 0.0 | |
| KlimalisteBW | | | | | 38 | 0.0 | ▼0.9 |
| Informal votes | | 799 | | | 438 | | |
| Total valid votes | | 90,773 | | | 91,134 | | |
| Turnout | | 91,572 | 70.2 | ▲6.6 | | | |
| CDU gain from Greens | Majority | 4,360 | 4.8 | | | | |

== See also ==
- Politics of Baden-Württemberg
- Landtag of Baden-Württemberg
