= Tübingen (Landtag electoral district) =

State electoral district of Germany

62: Tübingen
- Electoral district for the Landtag of Baden-Württemberg
- Tübingen in 2026
- District: Tübingen
- Electorate: 135,025 (2026)
- Major settlements: Ammerbuch, Bodelshausen, Dettenhausen, Mössingen, Neustetten, Ofterdingen, Rottenburg am Neckar, and Tübingen

Current electoral district
- Party: Green
- Member: Daniel Lede Abal

Tübingen is an electoral constituency (German: Wahlkreis) represented in the Landtag of Baden-Württemberg.

Since 2026, it has elected one member via first-past-the-post voting. Voters cast a second vote under which additional seats are allocated proportionally state-wide. Under the constituency numbering system, it is designated as constituency 62.

It is wholly within the district of Tübingen.

== Geography ==
The constituency includes the districts of Ammerbuch, Bodelshausen, Dettenhausen, Mössingen, Neustetten, Ofterdingen, Rottenburg am Neckar, and Tübingen within the district of Tübingen.

There were 135,025 eligible voters in 2026.

== Members ==
=== First mandate ===
Both prior to and since the electoral reforms for the 2026 election, the winner of the plurality of the vote (first-past-the-post) in every constituency won the first mandate.

Election	Member	Party	%
1976	Gerhard Weng	CDU	
1980	Gerhard Weng	CDU	
1984	Gerhard Weng	CDU	
1988	Friedhelm Repnik	CDU	
1992	Friedhelm Repnik	CDU	
1996	Friedhelm Repnik	CDU	
2001	Friedhelm Repnik	CDU	
2006	Klaus Tappeser	CDU	38.3
Jan 2008	Monika Bormann	CDU	38.3
2011	Daniel Lede Abal	Grüne	32.1
2016	Daniel Lede Abal	Grüne	38.0
2021	Daniel Lede Abal	Grüne	39.0
2026	Daniel Lede Abal	Grüne	34.7

=== Second mandate ===
Prior to the electoral reforms for the 2026 election, the seats in the state parliament were allocated proportionately amongst parties which received more than 5% of valid votes across the state. The seats that were won proportionally for parties that did not win as many first mandates as seats they were entitled to, were allocated to their candidates which received the highest proportion of the vote in their respective constituencies. This meant that following some elections, a constituency would have one or more members elected under a second mandate.

Prior to 2011, these second mandates were allocated to the party candidates who got the greatest number of votes, whilst from 2011-2021, these were allocated according to percentage share of the vote.

Election	Member	Party	Member	Party	Member	Party	Member	Party
1976	Roland Hahn	SPD	Hinrich Enderlein	FDP				
1980	Roland Hahn	SPD	Hinrich Enderlein	FDP	Wolf-Dieter Hasenclever	Grüne		
1984	Gerd Weimer	SPD	Hinrich Enderlein	FDP	Fritz Kuhn	Grüne		
1988	Gerd Weimer	SPD			Christine Muscheler-Frohne	Grüne		
1992	Gerd Weimer	SPD	Dietmar Schöning	FDP	Monika Schnaitmann	Grüne	Karl-August Schaal	REP
1996	Gerd Weimer	SPD			Sabine Schlager	Grüne		
2001	Rita Haller-Haid	SPD			Boris Palmer	Grüne		
2006	Rita Haller-Haid	SPD			Boris Palmer	Grüne		
May 2007	Rita Haller-Haid	SPD			Ilka Neuenhaus	Grüne		
2011	Rita Haller-Haid	SPD						
2016								
2021	Dorothea Kliche-Behnke	SPD						

== Election results ==
=== 2026 election ===
State election (2026): Tübingen
Notes:	Blue background denotes the winner of the electorate vote. Pink background denotes a candidate elected from their party list. Yellow background denotes an electorate win by a list member, or other incumbent. A ✓ or ✗ denotes status of any incumbent, win or lose respectively.						
Party	Candidate	Votes	%	±%	Party votes	%	±%
Greens	✓ Daniel Lede Abal	35,488	34.7	▼4.3	44,032	42.0	▲3.9
CDU	Diana Arnold	29,587	28.9	▲8.4	23,998	23.4	▲2.9
AfD	Anna Schneider	12,107	11.8	▲5.4	12,493	12.2	▲5.7
SPD	Dorothea Kliche-Behnke	9,156	8.9	▼2.6	4,729	4.6	▼7.0
Left	Katharina Poppei	8,882	8.7	▲2.0	8,231	8.0	▲1.3
FDP	Irene Schuster	3,061	3.0	▼4.6	3,577	3.5	▼4.2
BSW	Sören Lorenz	1,671	1.6		1,480	1.4	
FW					960	0.9	▼0.8
Volt	Pedro Treuer	1,471	1.4	▲0.6	814	0.8	Steady
APT					641	0.6	
PARTEI	Flavio Krahl	952	0.9	▼0.4	402	0.4	▼0.9
dieBasis					215	0.2	▼0.6
Bündnis C					186	0.2	
ÖDP					175	0.2	▼0.5
Pensioners					115	0.1	
KlimalisteBW					113	0.1	▼1.3
Values					111	0.1	
Team Todenhöfer					108	0.1	
Verjüngungsforschung					74	0.1	
PdF					72	0.1	
Humanists					57	0.1	▼0.3
Informal votes		579			371		
Total valid votes		102,375			103,583		
Turnout		102,954	76.2	▲5.8			
Greens hold	Majority	5,901	5.8				

== See also ==
- Politics of Baden-Württemberg
- Landtag of Baden-Württemberg
