= Steinlach =

River in Germany

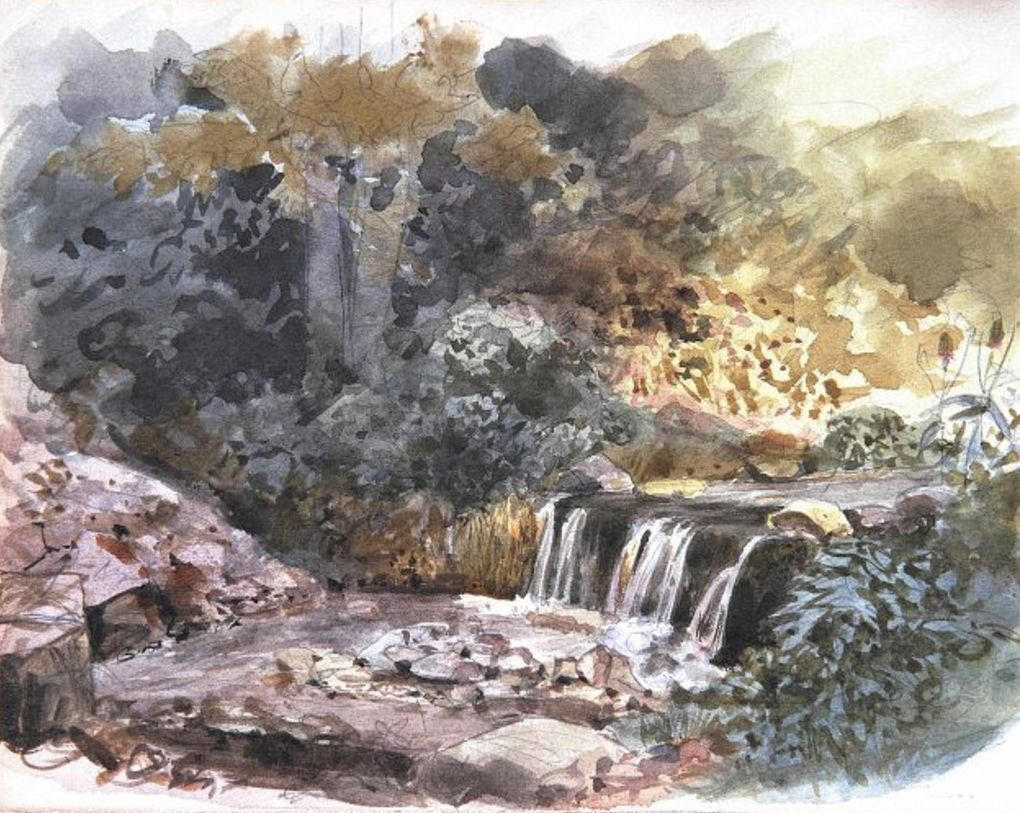
- Steinlach on an old watercolour painting of Eduard von Kallee of approx. 1870

Location
- Country: Germany
- State: Baden-Württemberg

Physical characteristics
- Mouth
  - location: Neckar
  - coordinates: 48.5178°N 9.0624°E
- Length: 25.9 km (16.1 mi)

Basin features
- Progression: Neckar→ Rhine→ North Sea

The Steinlach is a river with a length of 26 km (16 mi) in Baden-Württemberg, Germany. It is a tributary to the Neckar.

It has its source in the Eckenbachgraben, a gap in the Swabian Alb mountain range. The source is on the territory of the town of Mössingen, on an elevation of 700 m (2,300 ft) above sea level. The Steinlach flows into a northerly direction. After taking up several streams outside of Mössingen, it flows through Ofterdingen, Nehren and Dußlingen to Tübingen, where it discharges into the Neckar.

== Geography ==
=== History ===
The Steinlach has its source east of Mössinger District Talheim and west of Ruchberges at about 710 meters above sea Level in a northeastern side valley of the Eckenbachgraben, a gorge between five and ten meters deep below the Traufkante of the Swabian Alb. The source outlet of the somewhat longer left upper reaches from the Eckenbachgraben shifts with the karst water level of the Swabian Alb. The sources of both branches are just still located in the municipal area of Sonnenbühl.

The Steinlach enters the Steinlachtal near Talheim in the Alb foothills and is then strengthened by the Weiherbach, which is longer at its mouth and has a much larger catchment area. It now flows approximately northwest, takes the Öschenbach from the right one kilometer before Mössingen and then crosses Mössingen on its western course. After the Tannbach in Ofterdingen, which is also a considerable stream, flows from the south-southwest, it first follows its flow direction. But already from the isolated mill in Nehren it flows constantly northwards until the mouth. After the next village Dußlingen, its largest tributary, the Wiesaz, flows from the right, close to its powder mill. In the following short valley section forest heights move close to the river for the first time since Talheim, on the left and on the right side. From the right side the Ehrenbach coming from direction Ohmenhausen flows into the river at Bläsibad. On now straightened run through the Tübinger district Derendingen and finally through the southern part of the city centre of Tübingen, it reaches the Neckar, to which it flows from the right at about 317.5 meters above Sea Level, less than half a kilometre below the Neckarinsel.

The Steinlach flows into the river Steinlach after its almost 26 ‰ km long path with an average river bed gradient of 15 ‰ about 393 meters below its source.

=== Catchment area ===
The Steinlach drains almost 142 km^{2} at the Albtrauf around Mössingen and Gomaringen and in the Albvorland north to the Neckar. Its catchment area borders on its northeastern side already a little upstream of its mouth on the catchment area of the Echaz, the next large right tributary of the Neckar. On the southeast side, the European Watershed runs along the Albtrauf along the Albtrauf from the Rhine on this side to the Danube on the other side, direct competitor to the Danube is the Lauchert with its tributaries and its partly long underground karst tributaries. Behind the short southwestern watershed the Starzel now runs again to the Neckar above the Steinlach. The following neighbouring rivers behind, of which only the Katzenbach and possibly also the Bühlertalbach have some importance, drain the forest area of the Rammert, which extends adjacent to this side to the estuary of Tübingen.

The highest altitudes are all on the Albtrauf at the southeastern watershed, where the terrain rarely falls below 800 meters above Sea Level. The Monkberg south of Talheim above the headwaters of the Wangenbach reaches 884.4 m above Sea Level, the second highest Bolberg left above the valley slope of the upper Öschenbach 8808 meters above Sea Level.

=== Tributaries ===
Direct tributaries from the source to the estuary.

- Eckenbachgraben (longer right and eastern spring branch)
- (stream from the Tierental), from the left and southeast at the forest border before Talheim, 0,7 km
- Kirchbach, from right and east-northeast in Talheim, 1,1 km
- Weiherbach, from left and southwest at the western border of Talheim, 3,3 km and 9,3 km²
- Gässlesgraben, from left and west-southwest after the Steinlachmühle, 0,9 km
- Seebach, from right and east on just after the previous one, 4,1 km and 3,5 km²
- (stream from the Buchenstelle), from left and southwest near the brick hut of Mössingen, 1,4 km
- Öschenbach, from the right and east, 8,4 km and 12,3 km²
- Linsenbach, from left and southwest shortly before Mössingen, 1,3 km
- Bachsatzgraben, from right and east-northeast after the lower mill of Mössingen, 1,6 km
- Tannbach, from left and southwest at the southern edge of Ofterdingen, 8,7 km and 20,7 km²
- (stream of the Banweg), from the left and west southwest in southern Ofterdingen, 1,0 km
- Ehrenbach (!), from the right and southeast at the northeast edge of Ofterdingen, 0,9 km
- (stream from the Bienwund), from left and southwest opposite the Nehrener Mühle, 2,2 km
- Wiesbach or Oberwiesbach (!), from the right and southeast at the sports fields at the southern edge of Dußlingen, 4,7 km and 5,8 km²
- Laughter, from left and southwest in Dußlingen, 2,0 km
- Oberwiesbach (!), from the right and south-southeast in Dußlingen, 2,1 km; originates near the course of the previous Wiesbach
- Wertgraben, from left and west-southwest in Dußlingen almost still opposite the previous one, 2,1 km
- Weilersbach, from the left and west in Dußlingen, 2,4 km
- Rahnsbach, from left and southwest between the last commercial buildings in Dußlingen, 2,6 km
- Wiesaz, from the right and southeast near the powder mill of Dußlingen, 17,5 km and 38,7 km
- Ehrenbach (!), from the right and east-southeast after the sewage treatment plant of Dußlingen, 7.0 km (with left upper course Kalter Brunnen) and 9.6 km²
- → (exit of the Mühlbach), to the left in the industrial area on the southern edge of Derendingen, 4.0 km; flows into the flood ditch next to the Neckar opposite the Neckar island in Tübingen
- (inflow from Bläsiberg), from the right and east a few meters after the previous one, 0.6 km
- Bläsibach, from the right and east, 1,4 km
- (Waldbach from the Hohen Lehen), from right and northeast in the Derendinger Gartenstadt, 1,2 km
- Kaisersbrücklesgraben, from right and east-northeast at the river bridge of the Waldhörnlestraße, 0,8 km

== Geology ==
Through retrograde erosion (geology) the Steinlach has contributed to the formation of the Swabian layered landscape. On its way into the Neckar valley it cuts into all rock layers from White Jurassic down to the reed sandstone, the Stuttgart Formation of the Keuper. At morphologically hard rock layers waterfalls occur, for example at the Untere Mühle near Mössingen and northeast of Ofterdingen not far from the sawmill. Near Mössingen it cuts through several meters thick periglacial Limestone gravel surfaces, which probably led to the name Steinlach. It passes through narrow valley areas, especially in the Mössinger town area and north of the Pulvermühle. The Steinlach flows through the Mössinger gravel plain in a curved course and later on it deepens into the underlying layers of the Black Jura. At the Pulvermühle it has cut through the stratigraphic package of the Stubensandstein (Löwenstein Formation), but there it already runs in a wide sole notch valley. At its mouth it has deposited an overhanging gravel fan, which pushed the course of the Neckar to the north and on which parts of today's southern city of Tübingen were built. The deposition of this estuary delta slowed down the runoff and led to the filling of the sole notch valley up to Dußlingen. In Ofterdingen the Steinlach flows on the Arieten Limestone Bank, a fossil-rich layer of the Black Jura, Lias. Alpha. A section of the creek bed between Schillerstraße and Uhlandstraße was put under protection as a geological natural monument Ofterdinger Schneckenpflaster, because there are especially many stone cores of the name-giving ammonite Arietites bucklandi on the surface. The entrance of the stone puddle into the layers of the Lias Alpha near Ofterdingen caused the deflection of the course to the northeast and let the waterfall below the village develop.

== Significance for the settlement ==
Due to the humid climate with abundant precipitation throughout the year and the almost constant water supply, numerous Old Germanic villages were founded along the Steinlach (Mössingen, Ofterdingen, Dußlingen). The Germanic peasant clans used the Steinlach for drinking and process water purposes and as receiving waters for their sewage. Because the Steinlach had a permanent water supply and there are sections with a high gradient, mills settled on its banks early on. With the beginning of industrialization, industries with high water and energy requirements, such as textiles and later the chemical industry, also settled on its banks.

Water extraction and discharge of waste water had a strong impact on the water regime of the Steinlach and reduced its water quality. The protection of the traffic routes in the Steinlach valley and the southern part of Tübingen from Steinlach floods made it necessary to straighten the previously natural course of the Steinlach between Dußlingen and Tübingen, and thus to permanently impair it. The concreting of the Steinlach bed within Ofterdingen, which was carried out as early as the 1970s, also served the purpose of flood defence. At the same time, the mechanical-biological collective sewage treatment plant of the Abwasserzweckverband der Steinlach-Anliegergemeinden south of Derendingen as well as numerous rainwater retention basins were built. The water quality of the Steinlach was thus improved and flood peaks could be smoothed. However, the water yield of the Steinlach decreased, which has a negative effect on the water regime of the stream, especially during dry periods. The withdrawal of water, e.g. to supply water to gardens, is then mostly prohibited by the authorities.
