= Roßberg =

Roßberg is a German name for a hill or mountain and may refer to:

- Roßberg (Black Forest) (1,124.7 m), mountain in the Black Forest, Baden-Württemberg, Germany
- Roßberg (Haardt) (637 m), third highest mountain in the Palatine Forest, Rhineland-Palatinate, Germany
- Roßberg (Swabian Jura) (869 m), a mountain in the Swabian Jura, Baden-Württemberg, Germany
