= Mössingen =

- Town
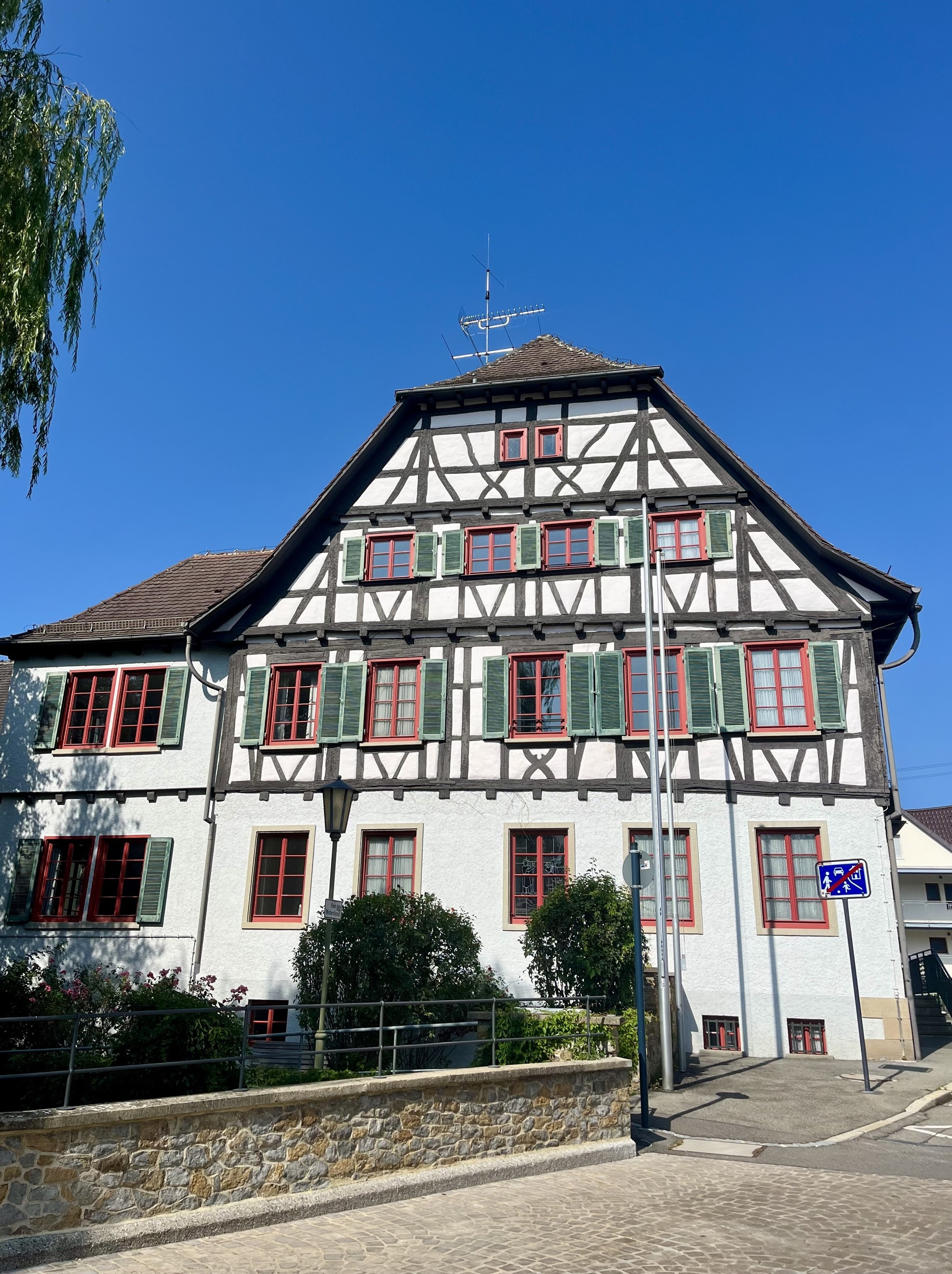
- Old Town Hall Mössingen

- Coat of arms

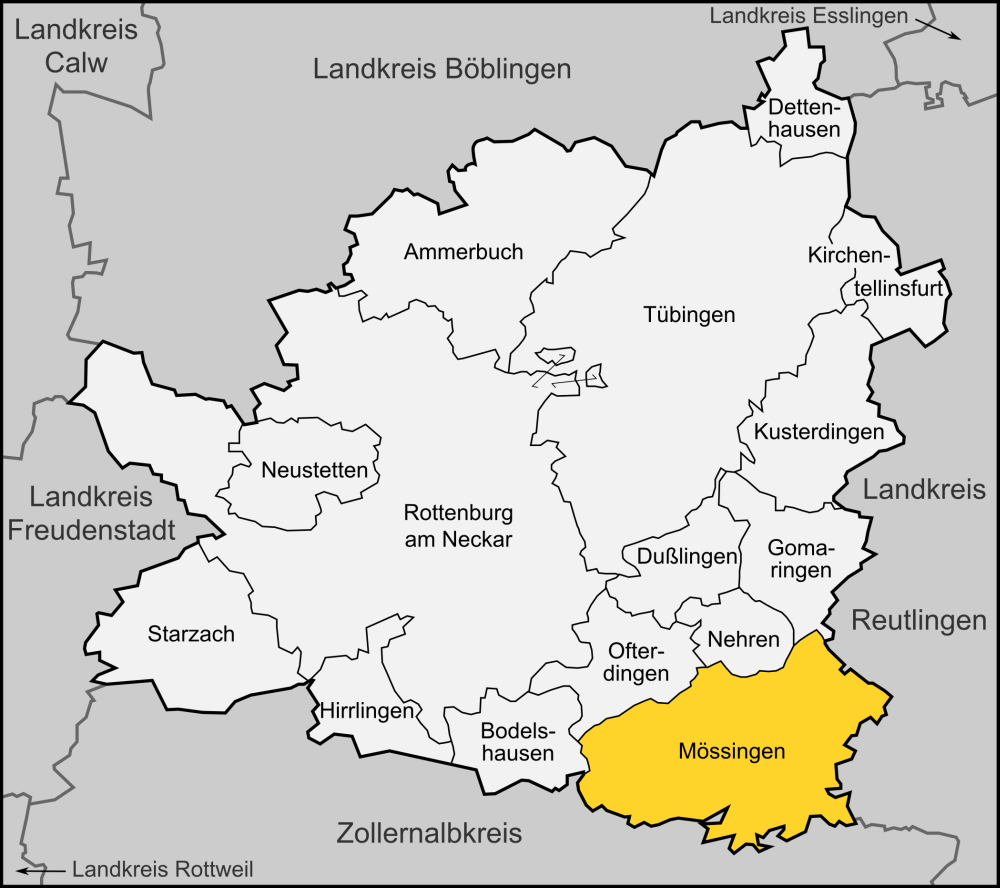
- Location of Mössingen within Tübingen district
- Interactive map of Mössingen
- Location within Germany Location within Baden-Württemberg
- Coordinates: 48°24′23″N 09°03′27″E
- Country: Germany
- State: Baden-Württemberg
- Admin. region: Tübingen
- District: Tübingen
- Subdivisions: 6 Stadtteile

Government
  - Mayor (2018–26): Michael Bulander (Ind.)

Area
  - Total: 50.03 km^{2} (19.32 sq mi)
- Elevation: 477 m (1,565 ft)

Population (2025-12-31)
  - Total: 21,658
  - Density: 432.9/km^{2} (1,121/sq mi)
- Time zone: UTC+01:00 (CET)
  - Summer (DST): UTC+02:00 (CEST)
- Postal codes: 72116
- Dialling codes: 07473
- Vehicle registration: TÜ
- Website: moessingen.de

Mössingen (German pronunciation: [ˈmœsɪŋən]) is a town in the district of Tübingen, in Baden-Württemberg, Germany. It is situated north of the Swabian Jura, about 13 km south of Tübingen.

== Geography ==
Mössingen is located on the northern edge of the Swabian Jura in the Valley of the Steinlach, a right tributary of the Neckar. The lowest point of the urban area is 435 m NN at the Untere Mühle (lower mill) on the Steinlach, the highest point is on the top of Dreifürstenstein with 853.5 NN.

=== Geology ===
Mössingen is in the area of a convoluted rock sequence from clays, sandstones, marls and limestone benches of Black, Brown and White Jurassic (Lias, Dogger and Malm). Most important are the more than 100 m thick banked limestones of the White Jura β constituting the highly visible edge of the Swabian Jura.

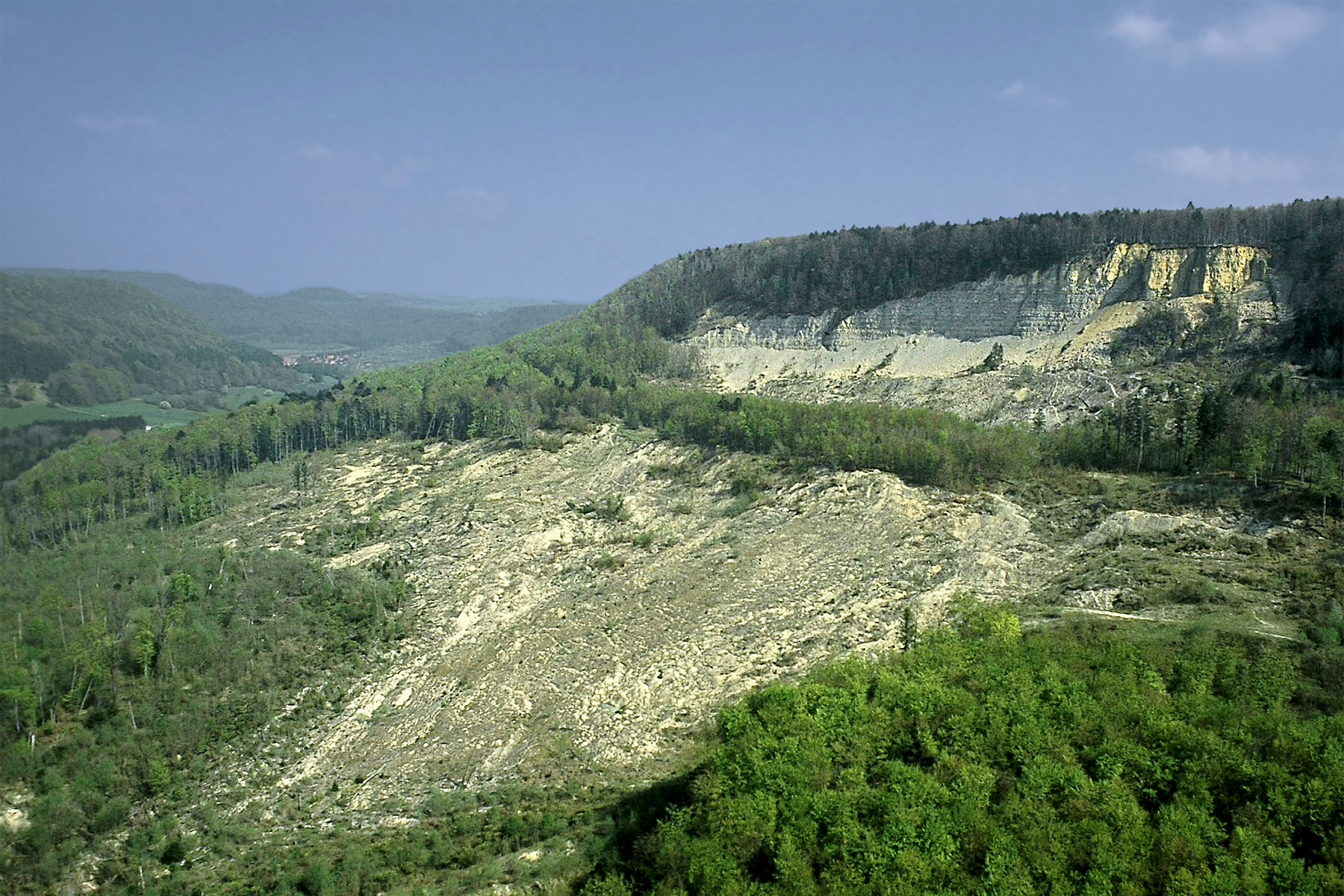
Mössingen Landslide

On 12 April 1983, after persistent rains, the largest landslide in Baden-Württemberg took place in the Mössingen district at the Hirschkopf (stag head), 48°22′40″N 09°04′00″E) due to the layered conditions of different rocks of the edge of the Alb (Albtrauf). Hard limes are stored here on plastic marls and clays. Furthermore, rock material is continually transported away by natural erosion, so it must come inevitably sooner or later to such a slide. On 12 May 2006, this area was included to the list of National Geotops.

Other major landslides occurred, also after previous heavy rainfall, on 3 June 2013. The area of about one hectare was taken solely at the landslide in the Öschingen cottage settlement. The settlement was evacuated then. More landslides occurred on the southwest side of the Farrenberg, on Buchberg, at the Talheim waterfalls and at the Talheim platforms.

=== Landscape ===
From April to June, various natural flowering aspects arise starting with the plum and cherry and ending with the flowering of the species-rich meadows on the escarpment of the Swabian Jura. The slopes of the nearby city Mössingen, Albberge and parts of Albvorland such as the Firstberg or the Bästenhardt forest, are forested. Specifically, the marl hangs and locations via shale and Dogger/were planted in the past with softwood. The streams are usually accompanied by natural alder-ash forests. Small area calcareous grasslands on Brown Jura slopes recall the time when the shepherding still took a greater role.

=== Protected Areas ===
Parts of the urban area with the Mössingen Farrenberg and the Roßberg include the 92/43/EEC Habitats Directive areas 7620-343 Albtrauf between Mössingen and Gönningen and 7520-341 Albvorland in Mössingen.

The Protected Areas Olga Höhe (Olga Hight), landslip on Hirschkopf (stag head), [Filsenberg] and Öschenbachtal are incorporated into these protected areas. In the area of NSG landslide on Hirschkopf no more use will take place, so that there the natural evolution of living nature can be observed and researched scientifically by permanent observation.

=== Fauna ===
Mössingen has a rich variety of avifauna. Significant habitats are highly structured and large orchards. Outstanding are the individual-rich populations of the rare collared flycatcher. The plateau of Farrenbergs is a red-backed shrike habitat and reproductive center of the Euplagia quadripunctaria moth. On the Filsenberg incubates the woodlark. The orchards are also bat areas. In the woods on the Albtrauf bat boxes have been provided for the establishment of bats. There, the Bechstein's bat is found in large numbers.

=== Neighbouring communities ===
The following cities and municipalities adjoin the city Mössingen and belong to district of Tübingen¹ or the Reutlingen county² and the Zollernalbkreis³ (starting clockwise from the north): Nehren¹, Gomaringen¹, Reutlingen², Sonnenbühl², Burladingen³, Hechingen³, Bodelshausen¹ and Ofterdingen¹.

=== Constituent communities ===
Mössingen

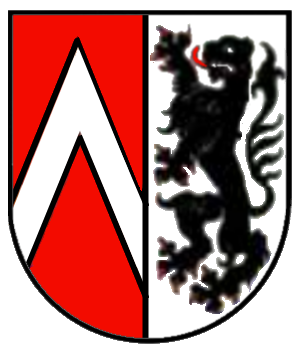
Öschingen

Talheim

Coats of arms

The city Mössingen consists of the three districts Mössingen, Öschingen and Talheim. The neighborhoods are spatially identical to the former municipalities of the same name.

Mössingen includes the core city Mössingen, the village Belsen, the hamlet Bad Sebastiansweiler, the houses Ziegelhütte and the district of Bästenhardt. The district Öschingen includes the village and the houses Krümlingmühle. The district Talheim includes the village Talheim and the courtyards Bleiche, Obermühle, Salpeterhütte and Unterhütte.

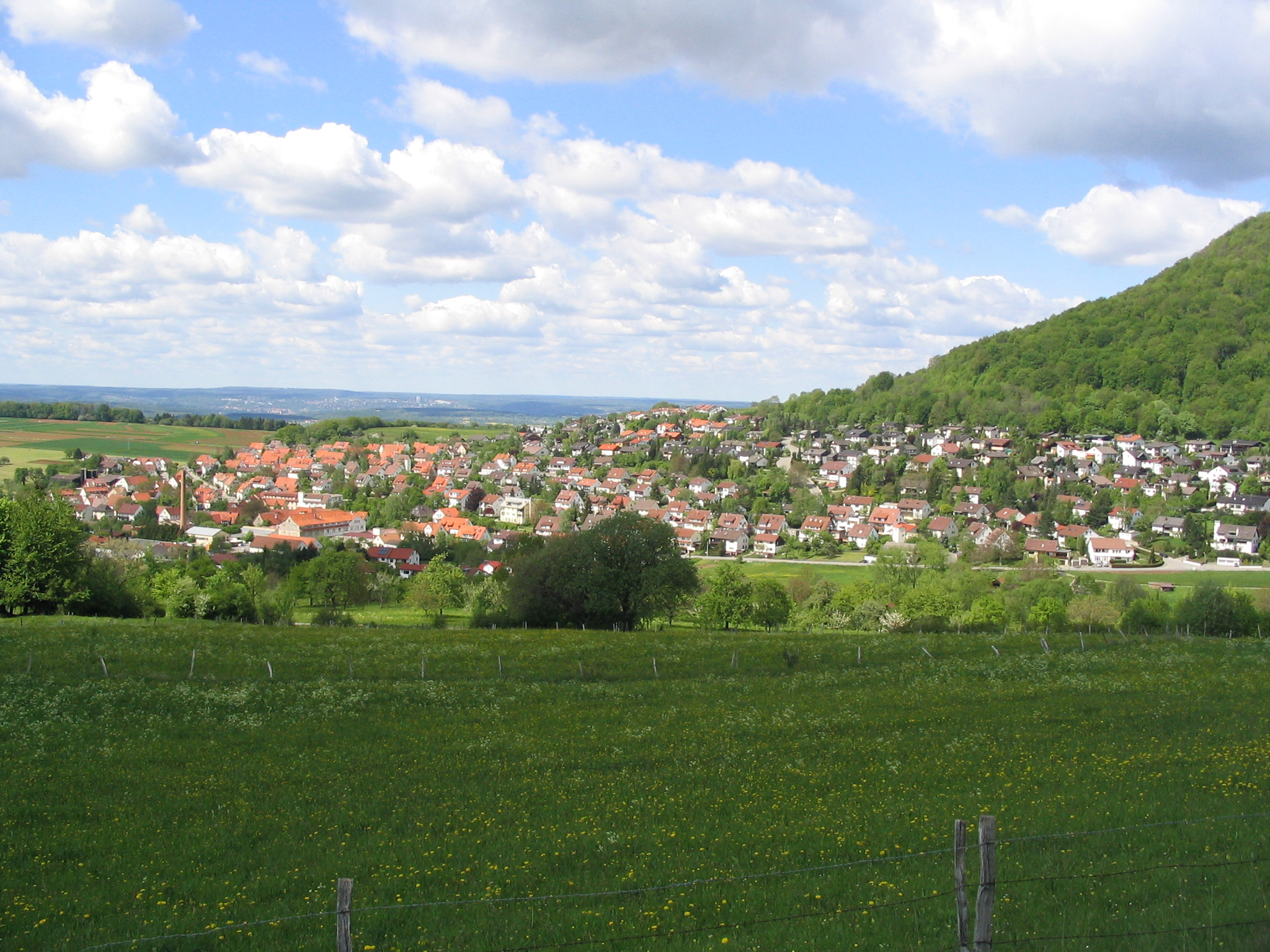
Öschingen

In the city there are several proofs of former, no longer inhabited localities and proofs of former castles: Buch, a bathhouse im Butzen, St. Johannesweiler and Steinhofen, the proofs of former castle First in Öschingen district and the deserted hamlet in the district Talheim.

== History ==
Mössingen is first mentioned in a document of Lorsch Abbey ("in pago Alemannorum in Messinger marca") from the year 774. Until the early 15th century Mössingen belonged to the Counts of Zollern. After a dispute between Count Friedrich XII. and the Lords of Ow Mössingen was looted and burned in the early 15th century. Consequently, the Mössingen cemetery was attached with a high Wall and a defensive tower. 1415 pledged Count Friedrich von Zollern Mössingen to Count Eberhard von Württemberg. After protracted negotiations with the Count of Zollern, Mössingen came in 1441 finally to the Duchy of Württemberg. In 1534, Ulrich of Württemberg introduced the Reformation. As a result of the Thirty Years' War, the war of succession and the Revolutionary Wars took place and caused serious economic damage. An emigration swell in the late 18th to the early 19th century to Poland, Transylvania and America weakened the site further.

Mössingen found widespread attention on 31 January 1933, as the location of the sole workers' uprising in Germany against the seizure of power by Adolf Hitler. The Mössingen general strike, led by members of the Communist Party of Germany, led to 80 arrests.

Through population growth, immigration profits by expellees and foreign and resettled Russia German, the economic upturn from 1950 reached the region. A commuter town, Bästenhardt, was built.

On 1 January 1971, the inclusion of the municipality Talheim took place. Öschingen was incorporated on 1 December 1971. On 1 January 1974, the municipal rights were awarded. As a result of the further increase in population, the city has been further expanded. In Öschingen, Belsen and at the edges of the core city and Bästenhardt incurred large residential areas. Industry settled primarily on the north side and between the core city and Bästenhardt/Belsen. The town hall was rebuilt at the station, the old city center was pedestrianized. Also, contributed to the traffic exculpatory, North and South ring were built.

2008, the state government approved the proposal of the city, to raise Mössingen on 1 January 2009 to Große Kreisstadt.

=== Districts ===
The Mössingen neighborhoods have a convoluted and different story, though all including the urban core belonged till 1403 to the county of Zollern and then came to Württemberg. Here they belonged to the Oberamt and 1934 to district Rottenburg. This became later district of Tübingen.

== Religions ==
Mössingen is Protestant since the Reformation. The currently existing parishes Martin Luther, Johannes and Peter and Paul belong to the Evangelical Lutheran Church. Furthermore, there are a community of evangelical pietists and the United Methodist Church of Christ. The Roman Catholic Church is located in the diaspora. The number of Catholic Christians grew with the influx of expellees and guest workers from Catholic regions. The enlargement of the Catholic parish made a new church in the new city center necessary.

The New Apostolic Church is represented in Mössingen with a church. A Baptist church community (Baptists) meets regularly in Belsen district. A Kingdom Hall of Jehovah's Witnesses is located in the industrial area Schlattwiesen. Muslims attend Friday prayers at the Ensar-Camii Mosque in the Karl-Jaggy-Straße.

== Politics ==
The office of the Regional Association Neckar-Alb is since 1 November 1992 in Mössingen.

There is an agreed management unit of the Town of Mössingen with the communities Bodelshausen and Ofterdingen. In the regional plan Mössingen is recognized as a center and is part of the central region of Tübingen. Mössingen leads in addition, relief and supplementary functions at the level of a middle center.

=== Mayors ===
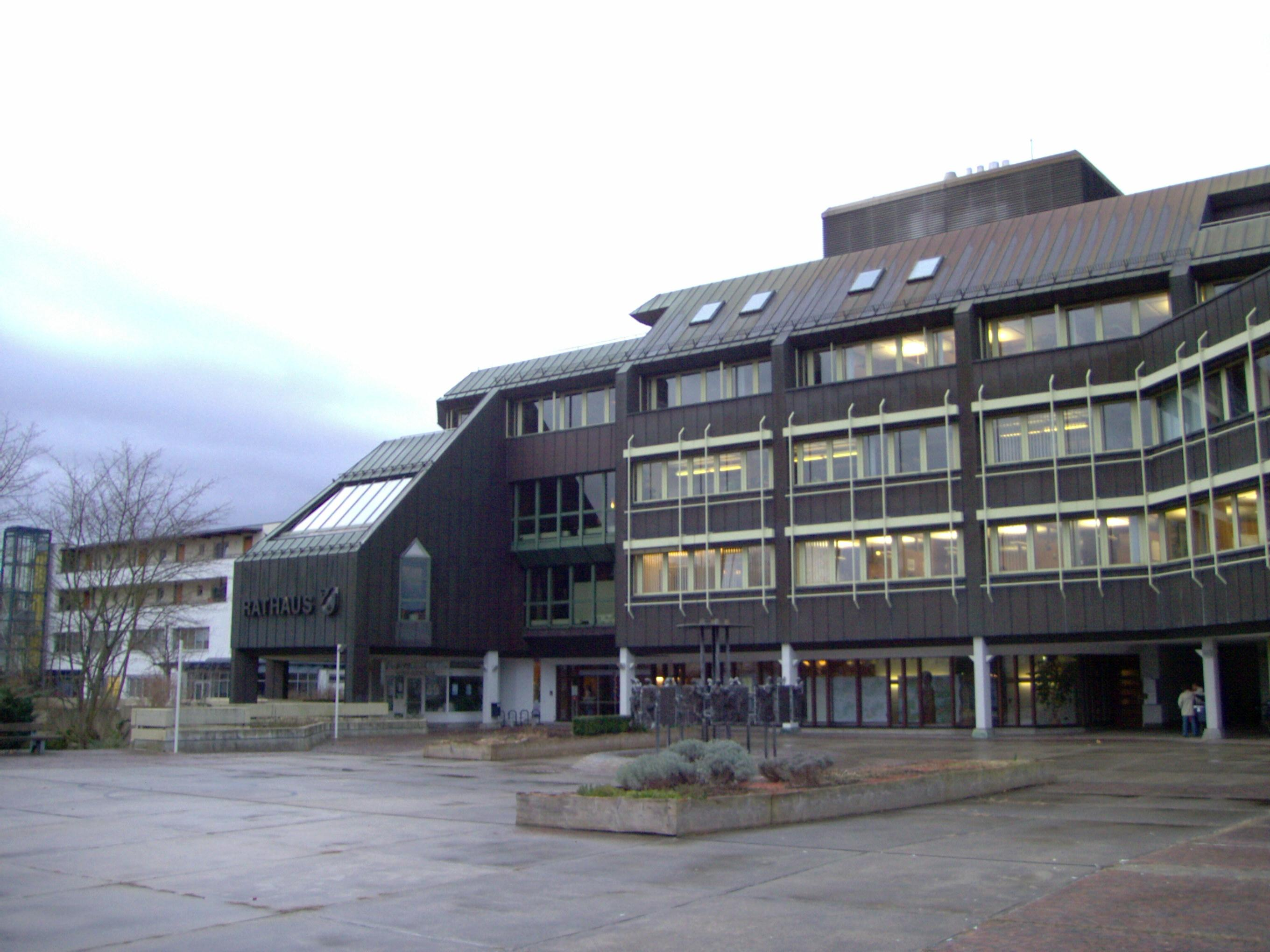
Mössingen new town hall

Since the survey for major district town (2009) the mayor (regular legislature, eight years) carries the official title of Mayor.

- 1893-1902: Schultheiß Bauer
- 1902-1933: Karl Jaggy
- 1933-1945: Gottlieb Rühle
- 1945: Jakob Stotz
- 1945-1962: Gottlieb Rühle
- 1962-1982: Erwin Kölle
- 1982-1998: Hans Auer
- 1998-2010: Werner Fifka
- Since 1 October 2010: Michael Bulander

=== Crest ===
Old crest of Mössingen in 1952

The coat of arms was introduced in 1952 by the former municipality Mössingen. The colors of the emblem black and silver are intended to identify the former membership in the county Zollern. The coat of arms shows on a black background with a silver diagonally upward to the left an extending waveband, which divides the black escutcheon in a right upper and left lower panel. The upper right box are three small heraldic shields. The lower left panel shows a silvery fountain with shared water jet. The three heraldic shields in the right upper field should remember the Dreifürstenstein, the mountain of Mössingen. On Dreifürstenstein the boundaries of the three territories Württemberg, Hohenzollern and Fürstenberg clashed.

=== Twinning ===
Saint-Julien-en-Genevois, France, since 13 January 1990

== Culture ==
=== Music ===
Sacred concertos Mössingen. Venue of the "Spiritual Concerts" are the three Protestant churches in Mössingen and the Catholic Marienkirche. The Peter and Paul church has excellent acoustics and a Weimer organ from 1820. For smaller forces, the Johannes Church in Bästenhardt is suitable for smaller casts. The modern Catholic Marienkirche has a 2-manual organ of.

=== Theater ===
Theater group Schwobastroich

=== Cinema ===
The "Lichtspiele Mössingen" are regarded as one of the most beautiful theaters in southwestern Germany. The program series "cinema on Friday" and "Cinema & Church" (since 1991) show the latest movies. The cinema was awarded several times.

== Attractions ==
- Bird Protection Centre (Vogelschutzzentrum)

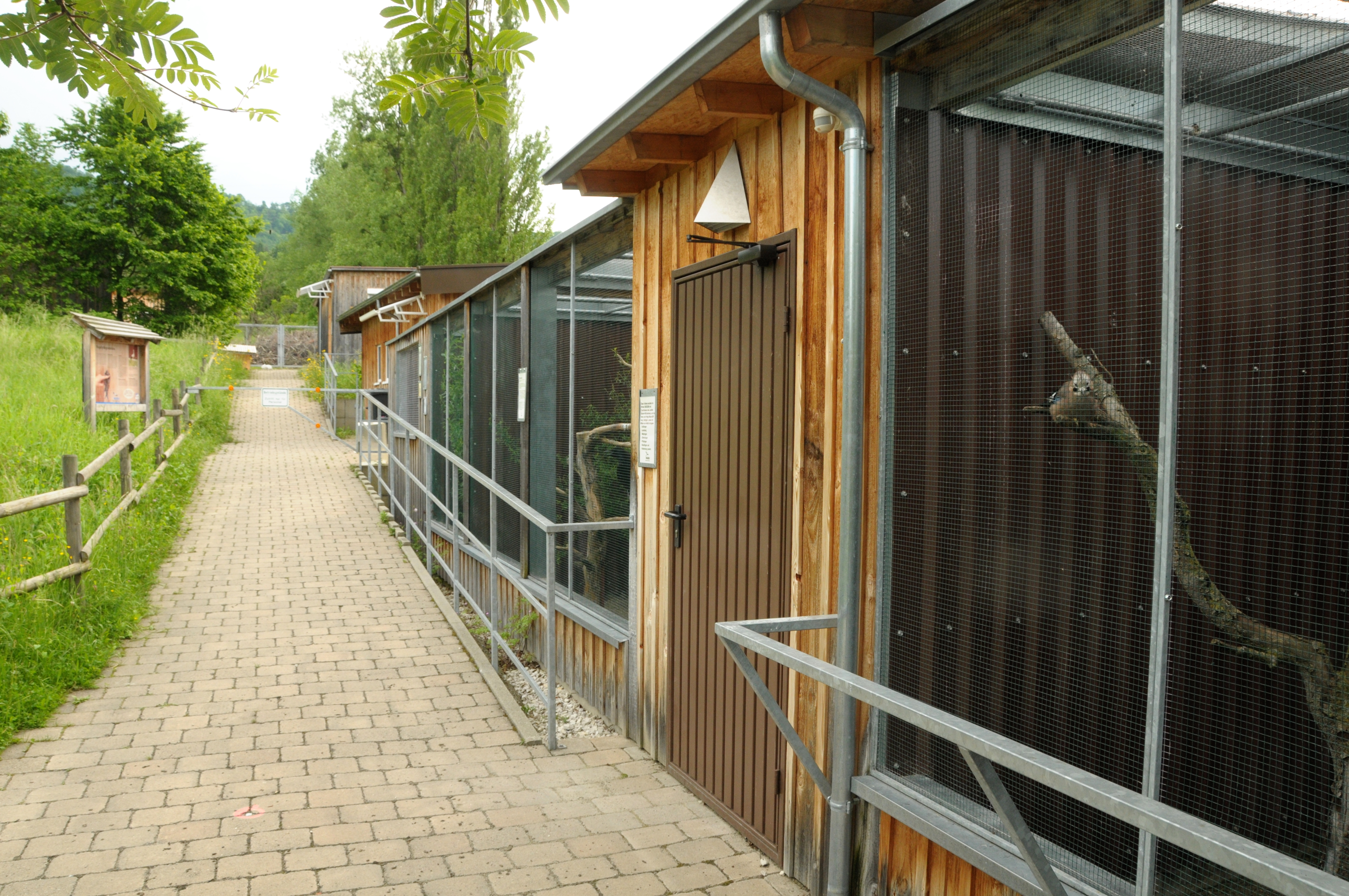
Vogelschutzzentrum

- Mössingens special jewelry since 1992 are the colorful flower meadows, blooming roadside strips and roundabouts. The jury of the national competition of the "Entente Florale Germany" granted the town in October 2001 with the gold medal.
- NABU maintains in Mössingen in Ziegelhütte a bird center accessible for visitors. Here are treated annually more than 100 injured or ill birds and bats.

=== Museums ===
- Woodcut Museum Klaus Herzer in the Öschingen Schultheiß House
- Rake maker Haus Wagner in Mössingen
- Space Museum Fritz in Talheim
- Knife wrought in Mössingen, Hirschgasse 13
- Kulturscheune in Brunnenstrasse with changing exhibitions
- PAUSA Museum (under construction)

=== Memorials ===
Since 1985, a memorial plaque on the Jacob-Stotz Square reminds of the communist opponent of Hitler Jacob Stotz, who led as authoritative party to Mössinger general strike of 31 January 1933 one of the few made in Germany 'protests against the Nazi dictatorship for which he was sentenced to several years of imprisonment, but this survived and after 1945 participated in the democratic reconstruction of the site. since 2003. Furthermore, recalls the Langassturnhalle (gym) another plaque on the Mössingen general strike.

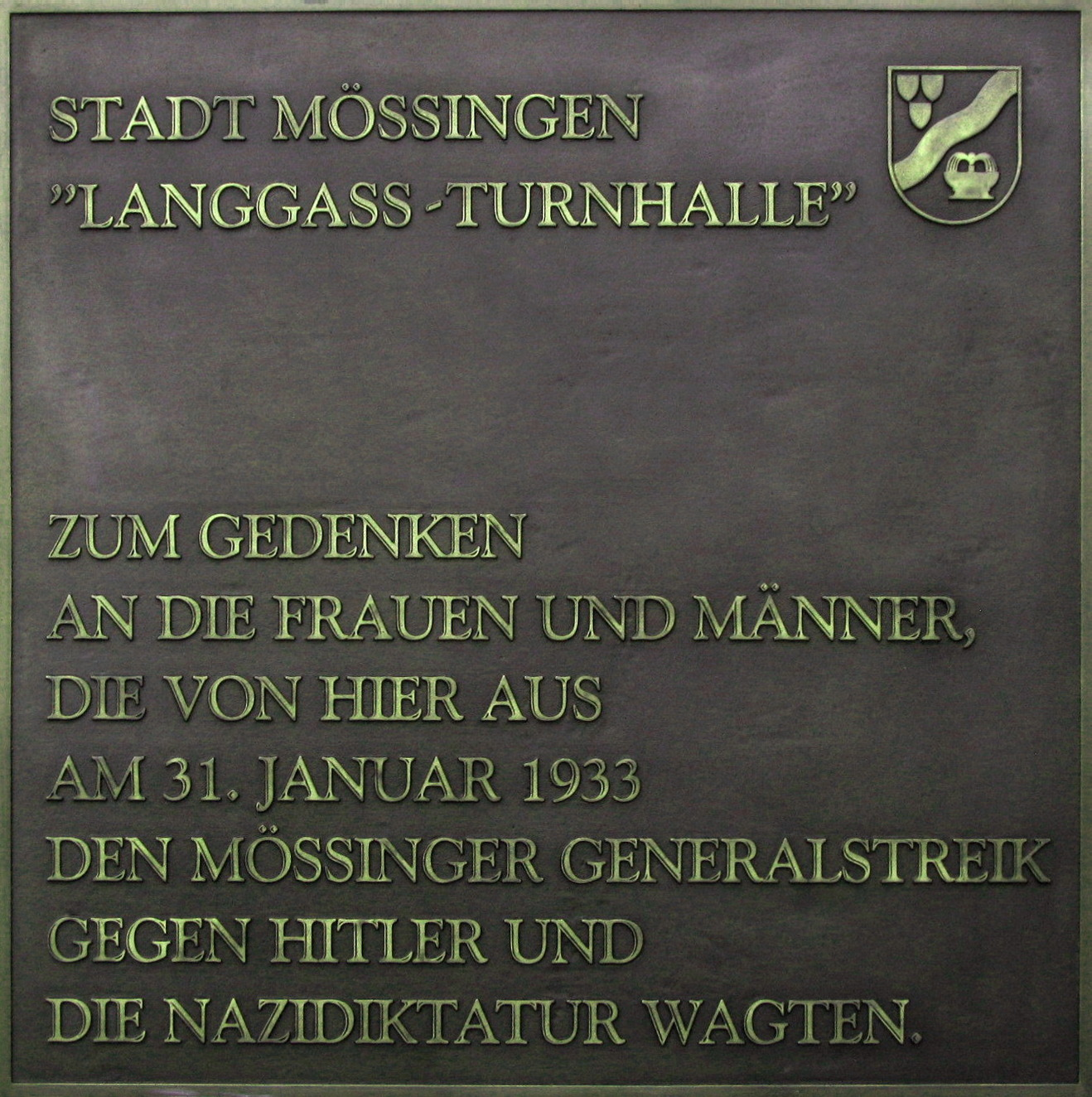
Memorial plate Langass gym

=== Buildings ===
- Peter and Paul's Church (1977)
- Belsener chapel
- Evangelical Peter and Paul Church (built in 1517, Weimer organ from 1820)
- Restored half-timbered houses in the old center, including the old town hall and the gypsum mill.

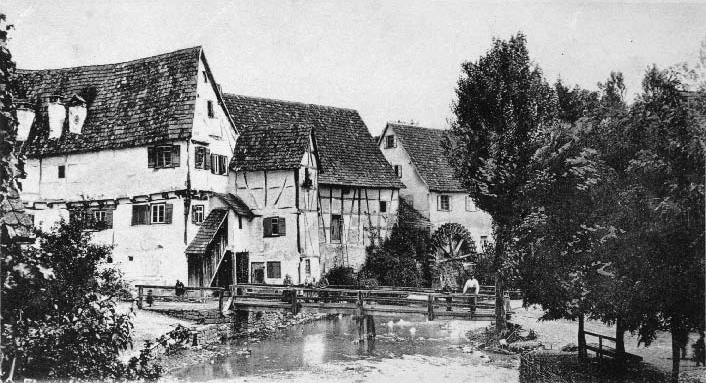
Gypsum mill around 1900

- Quenstedt-Gymnasium in the education center at the south end of the city core
- Listed industrial architecture from 1928 and 1951 parts of the textile factory Pausa were designed by the architect Manfred Lehmbruck and 2004–2011 for historical monuments restored and converted by the Office Baldauf Architekten The project received the 2011 Award for exemplary building of the Chamber of Architects Baden-Württemberg

=== Recreation areas ===
- Olga Height: 602-meter-high (1,975 ft) foothills of Farrenberg with forest playground and barbecue hut. From there views are given to the city, the county Mössingen-Tübingen and the orchards.
- Park and sulfur spring bath Sebastiansweiler
- Dreifürstenstein: an 853.5-meter-high (2,800 ft) mountain peak south of the district Belsen, which can be reached via a path from the car park for hikers. From up there distant views to the peaks of the Black Forest are possible. On Dreifürstenstein the borders of three principalities came together.
- Farrenberg: a 820-meter-high (2,690 ft) mountain Mössingens with motor and sail airfield and various viewpoints to the Albvorland.

== Sports ==
Main carrier of sportsmanship in Mössingen is the Sports Association (SpVgg) Mössingen (approximately 2,000 members) with two sports fields and a clubhouse in the Lange Straße/Lichtensteinstraße. Tennis facilities of the Mössingen tennis club are located near the public swimming pool. In the industrial area "Lange Hirschen" there is a tennis hall. Aviation sports can be operated from the airfield on the Farrenberg. Boules, the French national sport can be played on two courses in the green area at the Steinlach.

== Regular events ==
- Maskenabstaubede of Steinlach Fasnacht Association on the Mössinger town square on 6 January (Epiphany)(put away the dust from masques)
- Carnival immolation in Mössingen place of townhall on carnival Tuesday
- Maypole festivities in Mössingen and its neighborhoods on 30 April (Walpurgis Night)
- Mountain fire on Olga height at the summer solstice on 21 June
- Street Gallery on the Mössingen Town Hall Square on the 2nd Sunday in July
- Air Show motor and sailing sports club on the Farrenberg
- For nothing & Outside Festival Mössingen
- Rose and Art Market
- Mössingen Stadtlauf (city running, annually since 2004)
- Every two years, the carnival club Mössingen makes a tent carnival
- Christmas market in early December in the Falltorstraße and around the Peter and Paul Church
- The Apple Festival on the first weekend of October. In the week before the network orchard organizes "Mössingen Apple Week".

== Specialty food ==
Pelmeni, the true Messenger Strudle are prepared by local butchers and restaurateurs still themselves.

- Mössingen Beer: The Mössinger brewery has remained as the only brewery of the former seven and brews in the production all usual beers from pilsner to wheat beer.
- Characteristic of the municipalities in the orchard area at Albtrauf are brandies, as well as for Mössingen and its subsites. Several distilleries exist and produce schnapps of even small quantities.

== Economy and infrastructure ==
=== Agriculture, forestry ===
Mössingen was until 1995 also the seat of a forestry office. Part-time farms are still widespread. A high priority occupies the Fruit picking.

=== Commercial ===
Engine of the economy has long been in the textile industry. The decisive factor was the situation at the Steinlach for the generation of electricity. One of the main employer was the PAUSA company, a textile printing works, founded in 1871. 1919, it was renamed PAUSA AG and was shut down in 2004. In second place are wood and metal processing industry. In Mössingen there are primarily small and medium-sized businesses. Extensive commercial areas are located in the south-west and north (Schlattwiesen) of core city. The current main emphasis is in trade and services. At the edge of the city core, numerous wholesale markets have settled. There are shops for the specific needs such as jewelers, opticians and toy stores, but also service providers such as financial institutions, insurance companies and medical practices.

=== Media ===
As local newspapers with appropriate local section are available the Schwäbisches Tagblatt and the Reutlingen General-Anzeiger. Once a week, the official journal of the Town Mössingen appears.

=== Mining ===
In a quarry on the western edge of the district the slate of the Black Jurassic was broken down for many years. Other quarries were located below the Hirschkopf. There White Jurassic lime was broken for the recovery of paths gravel.

=== Tourism ===
Despite the location of Mössingen on the Albtrauf, the presence of mineral springs and the diverse natural features, tourism has gained not a high priority.

== Education ==
Mössingen is an important regional center of education. In 1957 the Gottlieb-Rühle-secondary school was completed. This was followed in 1967 by the Friedrich-List-Realschule and 1973, the Quenstedt-Gymnasium and the Flattich-special school. In the southern port the Physically Handicapped School (KBS) just 2 years later emerged as part of the physically disabled Centre Neckar-Alb. Other primary and secondary schools are located in the districts and Bästenhardt Talheim. The Evangelical-Lutheran Church in Württemberg built from 1962 to 1965 northeast of Mössingen a secondary school with boarding, today Evangelische Schulen am Firstwald. The Volkshochschule Tübingen maintains a branch office in Mössingen.

== Traffic ==
The Bundesstraße 27 is connecting the city to the north with Tübingen and Stuttgart and to the south with Hechingen. From district Talheim leads L 385 as a pass road to the plateau of the Swabian Jura by Melchingen. The L 384 connects Mössingen with Reutlingen and the neighboring Nehren. A ring road, the north ring leads traffic around the north of Mössingen. It was built in 16 months for 5.061 million €.

Mössingen was officially connected with the inauguration of the station on 24 July 1869 to the railway network. It is currently breakpoint along the railway line Tübingen-Aulendorf, the so-called Tübingen-Sigmaringen railway. The Public transport is guaranteed by the Verkehrsverbund Neckar-Alb-Donau (NALDO). The city is located in the comb 113.

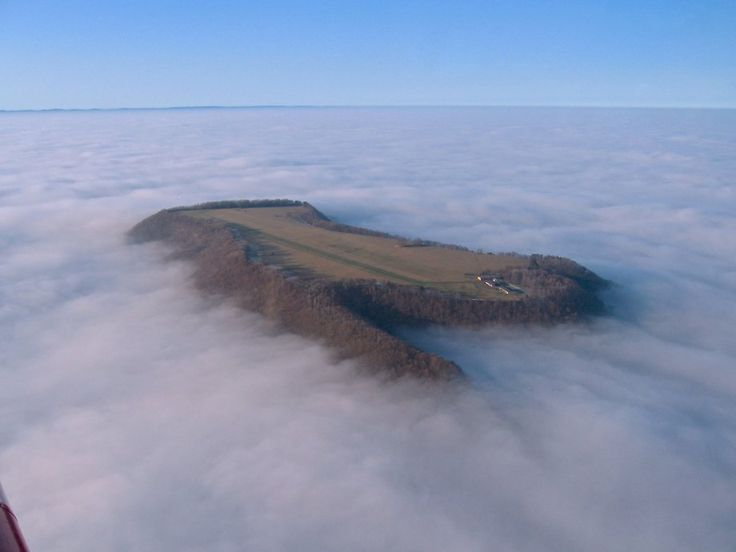
Airfield on the Farrenberg

An airfield (Segelfluggelände Farrenberg) for gliders and light aircraft is located on the Farrenberg south of the city.

== Water supply ==
The drinking water comes via pipelines from the Lake of Constance. In Talheim runs a pumping station to increase the water pressure. The association Lake Constance Water Supply has its headquarter in Stuttgart. The water reservoir for the drinking water supply of Mössingen is lying on the almost 600-meter-high Schlossbuckel. The waste water is treated in the sewage treatment in Steinlach near Tübingen.

== Public facilities ==
In Mössingen is a notary. Furthermore, Mössingen is the seat of the Foundation KBF, the largest employer of Mössingen.

== Personalities ==
- Johannes von Schlayer (1792–1860), Württemberg Minister of State, was trained here for official
- Dieter Schneider (born 1954), grew up in Mössingen and is the president of state criminal police office of Baden-Württemberg
- Rainer Temple (born 1971), jazz pianist, grew up in Mössingen and founded also rock bands
- Tedros "Teddy" Teclebrhan (born 1983), German comedian and actor, spent his childhood here
- Giuseppe Pellegrino (born 1983), German-Italian musician, grew up here
- Adrian Coriolan Gaspar (born 1987), Romanian-Austrian composer, spent his childhood in the city and now lives in Vienna

=== Honorary citizens ===
- Erwin Canz (29 June 1853 – 16 September 1937), building official
- Richard Burkhardt (12 March 1877 – 5 May 1958), manufacturer
- Otto Merz sen. (5 September 1886 – 19 October 1964), manufacturer
- Erwin Kölle (20 November 1920 – 10 February 2005), mayor
- Hans Auer (born 6 July 1939), mayor
- Willy Häussler (died 1986), director of the former company Pausa

=== Sons and daughters of the town ===
- Julius Speer (1905–1984), born in Talheim district, forest scientist
- Andreas Felger (born 1935), painter, sculptor and glass artist
- Willi Rudolf (Öschingen), entrepreneur, representative for disabled people
- Michael Lang (politician) (born 1965), mayor of Wangen im Allgäu
- Angelo Vaccaro (born 1981), Italian-German footballer

== Other ==
- The hurricane Lothar raged over Mössingen on 26 December 1999 and led to severe damage in several forests. The Bästenhardt forest in the west of the city was almost completely destroyed.
