= Wiesaz =

River in Germany

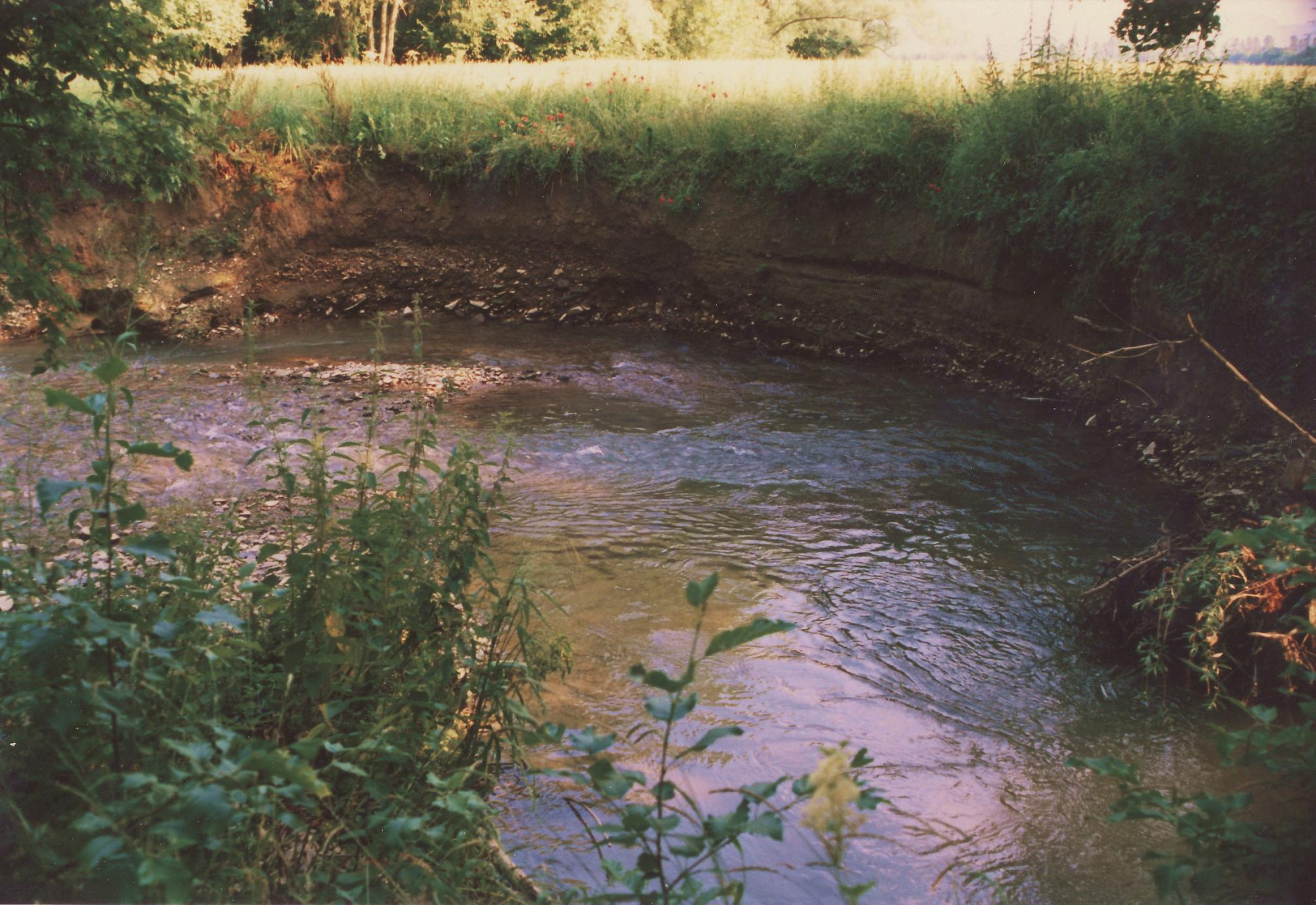

Location
- Country: Germany
- State: Baden-Württemberg

Physical characteristics
- Mouth
  - location: Steinlach
  - coordinates: 48.4715°N 9.0634°E
- Length: 17.5 km (10.9 mi)

Basin features
- Progression: Steinlach→ Neckar→ Rhine→ North Sea

Wiesaz is a river of Baden-Württemberg, Germany. It passes through Gomaringen and flows into the Steinlach near Dußlingen.

== See also ==
- List of rivers of Baden-Württemberg
