= Nehren, Baden-Württemberg =

Nehren
- Municipality
- Coat of arms

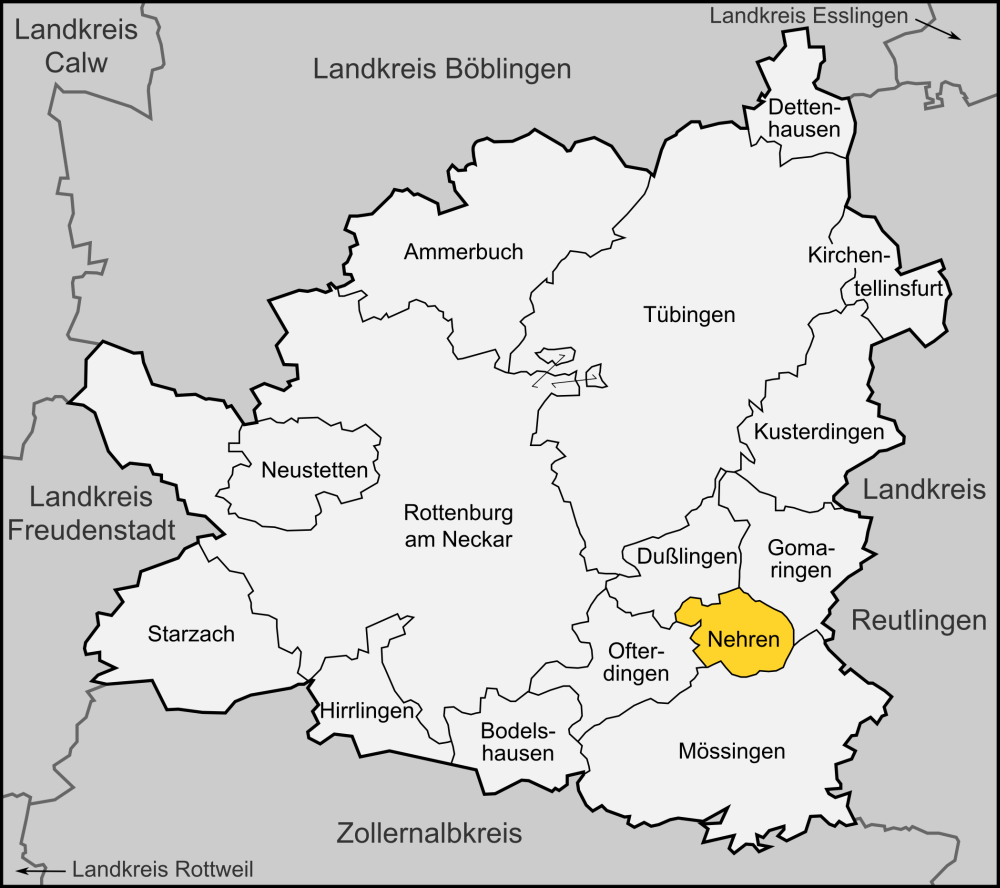
- Location of Nehren within Tübingen district
- Interactive map of Nehren
- Location within Germany Location within Baden-Württemberg
- Coordinates: 48°25′52″N 9°04′10″E
- Country: Germany
- State: Baden-Württemberg
- Admin. region: Tübingen
- District: Tübingen

Government
  - Mayor (2019–27): Egon Betz

Area
  - Total: 8.58 km^{2} (3.31 sq mi)
- Elevation: 427 m (1,401 ft)

Population (2025-12-31)
  - Total: 4,348
  - Density: 507/km^{2} (1,310/sq mi)
- Time zone: UTC+01:00 (CET)
  - Summer (DST): UTC+02:00 (CEST)
- Postal codes: 72147
- Dialling codes: 07473
- Vehicle registration: TÜ
- Website: www.nehren.de

Nehren (German pronunciation: [ˈneːʁən]) is a municipality on the outskirts of the Swabian Jura and belongs to the district of Tübingen and its catchment area. The following communities and towns border on the community of Nehren (clockwise, beginning in the north): Gomaringen, Mössingen, Ofterdingen and Dußlingen.

== History ==
Nehren was mentioned documentary for the first time in 1086. The settlement in today's form developed in the 15th and 16th centuries, when the abutting villages Nehren and Hauchlingen were combined, after they had been "churchly combined" some years before.

In the 18th century, some row graves were uncovered near "the Kappel". In the northeast of the railway Tübingen-Sigmaringen an area of the Hallstatt Time (about 8th-5th century BC), with approximately 30 grave hills, forms one of the biggest grave fields in the district of Tübingen. In former times Nehren possessed even a castle. During an excavation of the castle hill in the corridor "Weihergarten" in 1951 the foundation walls of a rectangular building, perhaps of a stone house or a tower, were laid open.

During the Thirty Years' War (1618 to 1648), Nehren suffered from draughts of alternating ruler's troops because of its location near the "Swiss road" (today: national road 27). The village was plundered and many houses and barns were destroyed.

More specific information about Nehren offer the "village chronicles". They were penned in 1838 by pastor Friedrich August Köhler (1768–1844), who worked and lived here for more than 10 years.

== Demographics ==
Population development:

Year	Inhabitants
1990	3,371
2001	3,693
2011	4,133
2021	4,466

== Public transportation ==
The L 384 state road connects Nehren to the close-by federal road B27. In this way Nehren is connected to Tübingen and Stuttgart in the north and Balingen and Rottweil in the south. The railroad line Tübingen-Hechingen-Sigmaringen has a hold point in the community. The public local traffic is warranted by the transport association Neckar-Alb-Donau (Naldo)

== Famous people from Nehren ==
- Hans Vaihinger (1852–1933), professor of philosophy
- Ernst Wulle, (1832-1902), German brewer, entrepreneur and founder of a non-profit organization
