= Gomaringen =

- Municipality
- Coat of arms

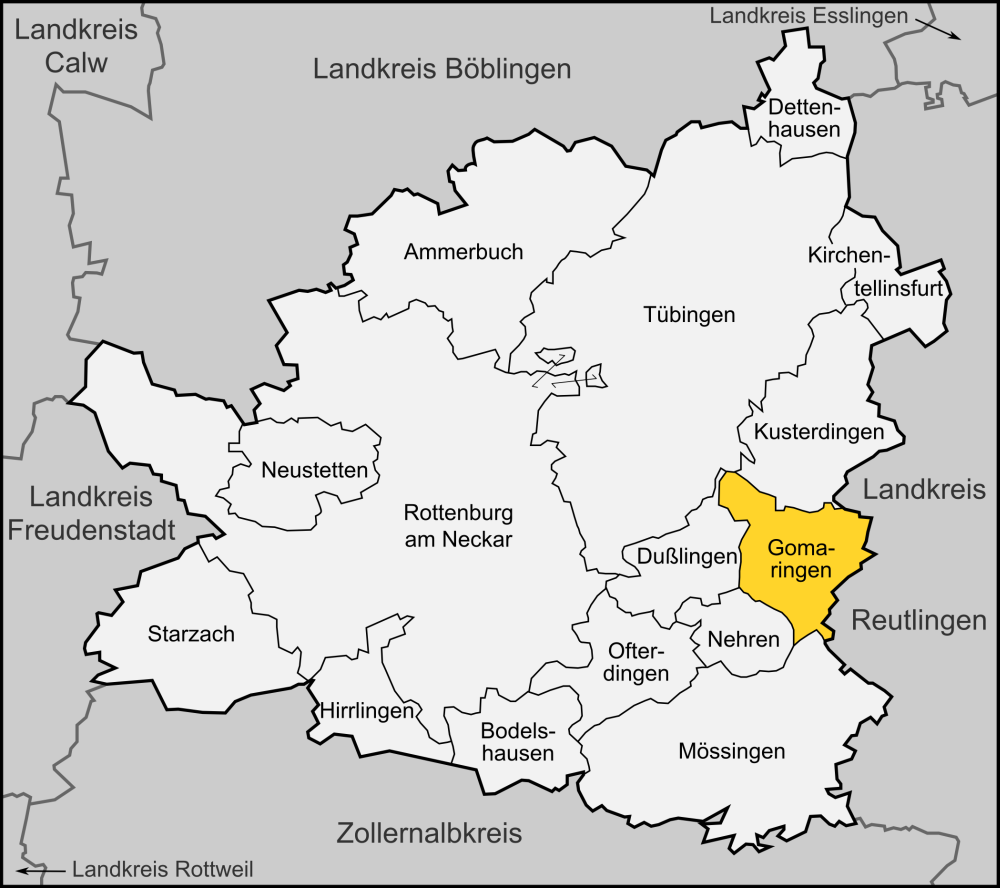
- Location of Gomaringen within Tübingen district
- Interactive map of Gomaringen
- Location within Germany Location within Baden-Württemberg
- Coordinates: 48°27′07″N 9°06′00″E
- Country: Germany
- State: Baden-Württemberg
- Admin. region: Tübingen
- District: Tübingen
- Subdivisions: 3 Ortsteile

Government
  - Mayor (2020–28): Steffen Heß

Area
  - Total: 17.3 km^{2} (6.7 sq mi)
- Elevation: 474 m (1,555 ft)

Population (2025-12-31)
  - Total: 9,114
  - Density: 527/km^{2} (1,360/sq mi)
- Time zone: UTC+01:00 (CET)
  - Summer (DST): UTC+02:00 (CEST)
- Postal codes: 72810
- Dialling codes: 07072
- Vehicle registration: TÜ
- Website: www.gomaringen.de

Gomaringen is a municipality located about 10 km south of Tübingen in the German state of Baden-Württemberg.

== Geography ==
=== Geographical Position ===
Gomaringen is located in the valley of the stream Wiesaz, a tributary of the Steinlach, which in turn flows into the Neckar.

=== Neighboring municipalities ===
The following cities and Municipalities border Gomaringen in clockwise order starting from the north. They belong to District of Tübingen or to District of Reutlingen.

- Kusterdingen
- Reutlingen (Reutlingen District)
- Mössingen
- Nehren
- Dußlingen
- Tübingen

=== Formation of the municipality ===
The settlements Hinterweiler and Stockach belong to the municipality of Gomaringen.

== History ==
- The ending of the name "ingen" is proof for the first settlement done by the Alamanni
- The name "Gomaringen" is first mentioned in a document in 1191, the chronicle of Berthold von Zwiefalten.
- Werner von Gomaringen (approx. 1356-1393) and Peter von Gomaringen (1393-1412) belonging to the house of the Herren von Gomaringen become abbots of Bebenhausen, the domestical monastery of the Pfalzgrafen von Tübingen.
- 1499: Gomaringen and its contemporary settlements Hinterweiler und Stockach are bought by Reutlingen. For a 150-year-long era reeves take care of the interests of the imperial city.
- 1648: Because of the high contributions in the Thirty Years War Reutlingen had to pay as an imperial city, it needed to sell Gomaringen and Hinterweiler to Württemberg.
- 1807: Gomaringen becomes member of the Oberamt, later the district Reutlingen.
- 1973: As a result of the district reformation in 1973, the municipality changed districts, from Reutlingen to Tübingen.

== Politics ==
Gomaringen is the seat of the municipal administration cooperation "Steinlach-Wiesaz". Other members are Dußlingen and Nehren.

=== Town Council ===
The last town election on 7 June 2009 had the following results at the last reapportionment:

- FWV - 7 seats
- SPD - 4 seats
- CDU - 4 seats
- Grüne Liste - 3 seats

=== International town partnership ===
- Arcis-sur-Aube in France, since 1976

== Culture ==
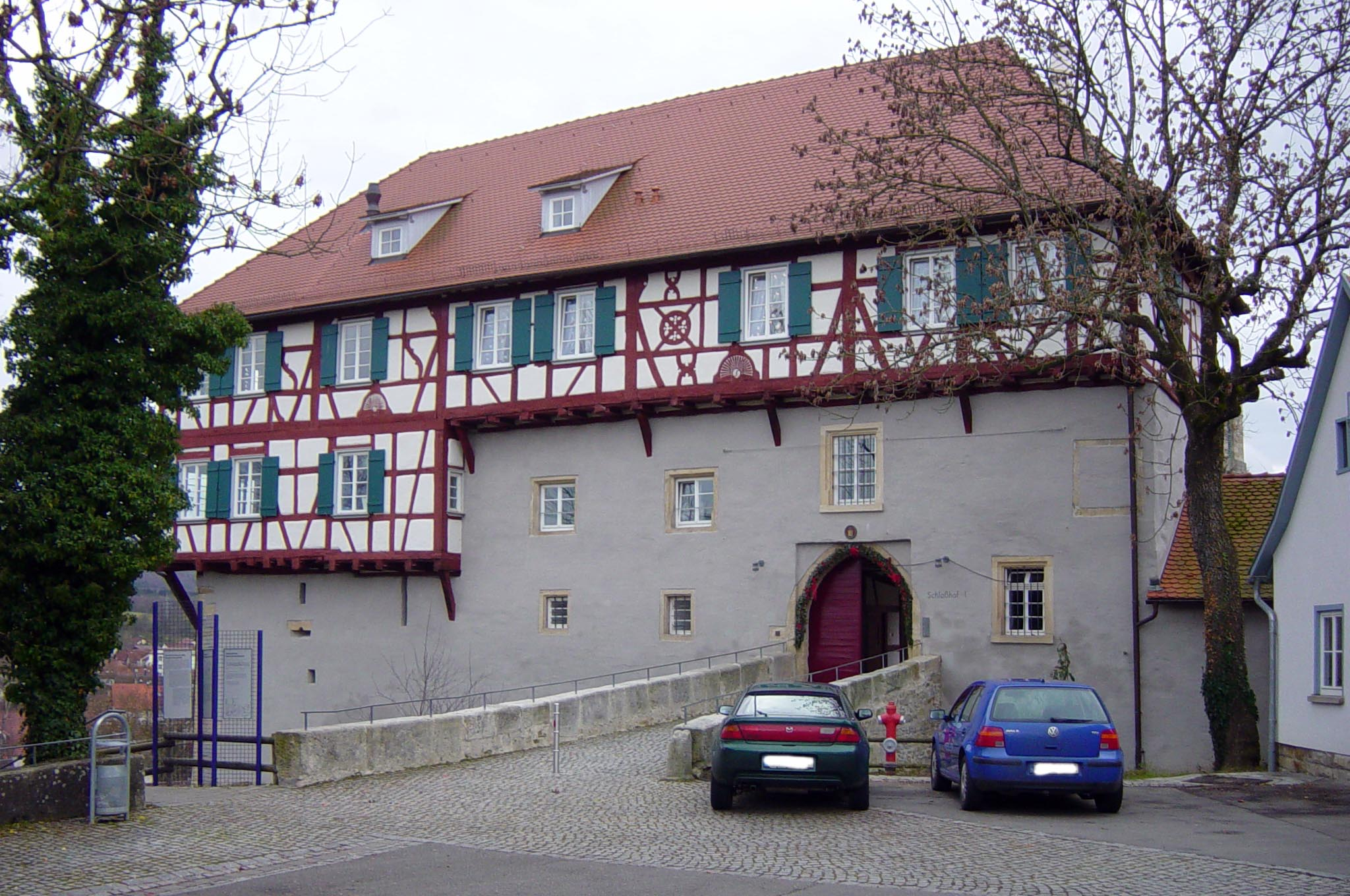
Gomaringen Castle

=== Museums ===
- Gustav-Schwab-Museum inside the castle palace

=== Castles ===
- Castle Gomaringen, started 1837 finished 1841, was the home of Gustav Schwab.

== Economy and infrastructure ==
=== Traffic ===
The state road L 230 links the town to the federal road B 27 and thereby to Tübingen and Stuttgart. The state road L 394 links Gomaringen east-bound to Reutlingen. The state road L 384 provides the link from Gomaringen to the Schwaebische Alb.

Public transport is provided by Verkehrsverbund Neckar-Alb-Donau (NALDO). The town is in comb no. 113.
