= Bodelshausen =

- Municipality
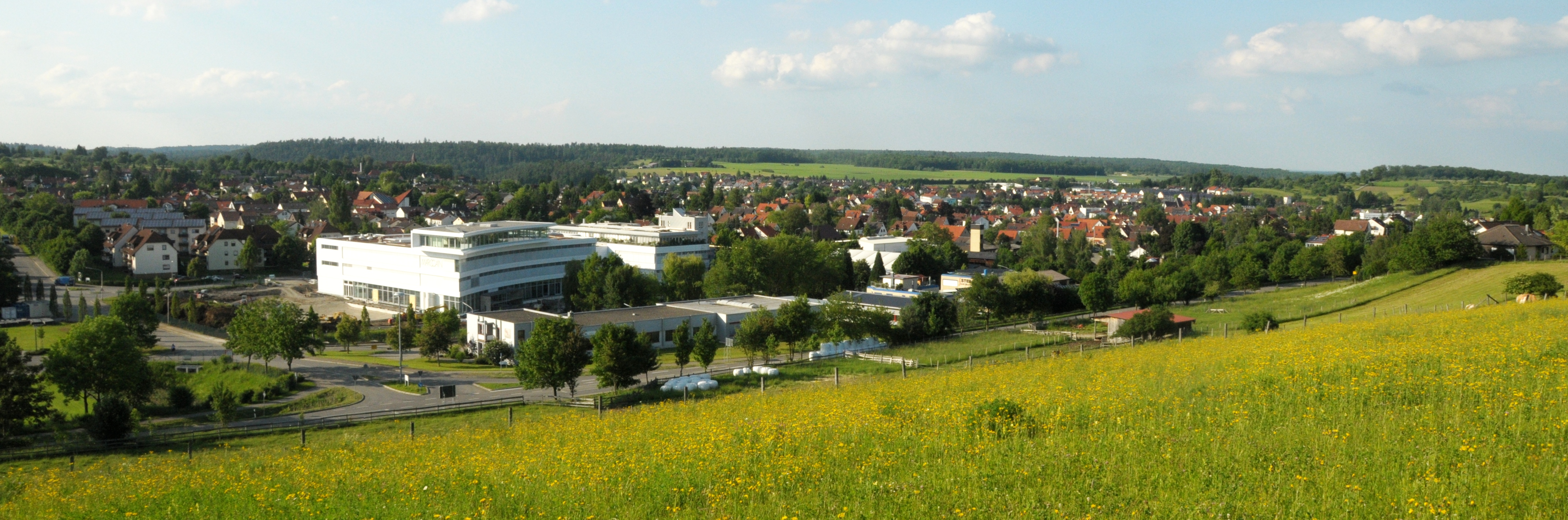

- Coat of arms

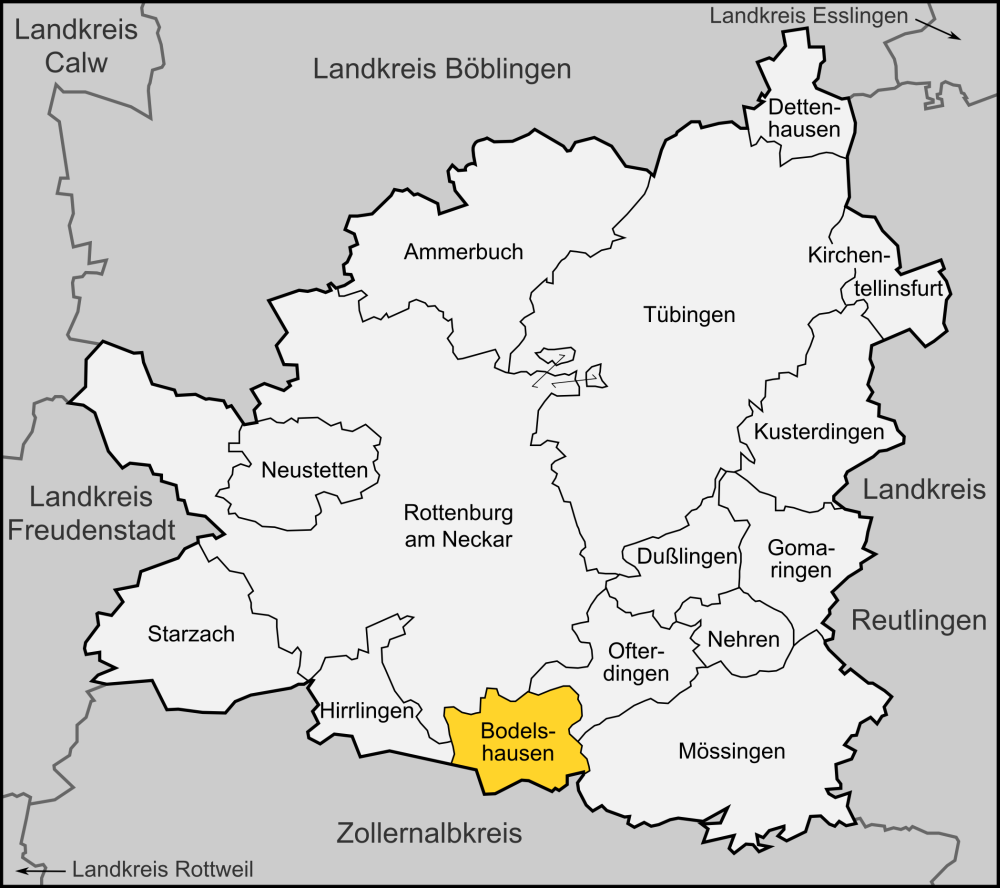
- Location of Bodelshausen within Tübingen district
- Interactive map of Bodelshausen
- Location within Germany Location within Baden-Württemberg
- Coordinates: 48°23′39″N 8°58′21″E
- Country: Germany
- State: Baden-Württemberg
- Admin. region: Tübingen
- District: Tübingen

Government
  - Mayor (2022–30): Florian King

Area
  - Total: 13.83 km^{2} (5.34 sq mi)
- Elevation: 508 m (1,667 ft)

Population (2025-12-31)
  - Total: 5,865
  - Density: 424.1/km^{2} (1,098/sq mi)
- Time zone: UTC+01:00 (CET)
  - Summer (DST): UTC+02:00 (CEST)
- Postal codes: 72411
- Dialling codes: 07471
- Vehicle registration: TÜ
- Website: www.bodelshausen.de

Bodelshausen (German pronunciation: [boːdl̩sˈhaʊzn̩]) is a municipality in the district of Tübingen in the German state of Baden-Württemberg.

== Geography ==
=== Geographical Area ===
Bodelshausen is situated southern of the Rammert forest near the town of Hechingen.

=== Neighboring municipalities and towns ===
Rottenburg am Neckar, Ofterdingen, Mössingen, Hechingen ¹ and Hirrlingen

== History ==
The oldest historical documents date back to 1100.

== Politics ==
=== Mayor ===
The mayor is elected for 8 years. Mayor Bernd-Dieter Esslinger's term ended in 2006. Since 2006, Uwe Ganzenmüller holds the office.

- 1982 – 2006: Bernd-Dieter Esslinger
- since 2006: Uwe Ganzenmüller

=== Sister municipalities ===
- Soltvadkert, Hungary (1996)

Bodelshausen maintains friendly relationships with:

- Hohburg, Saxony
- Market town Rum, Austria

== Economy and Infrastructure ==
The federal highway 27 connects the town with Tübingen and Stuttgart, as well as Balingen and Rottweil.

== Sons and daughters of the town ==
- Barbara Schober (* 1958), Multi-media artist and online journalist
