= Neustetten =

- Municipality
- Coat of arms

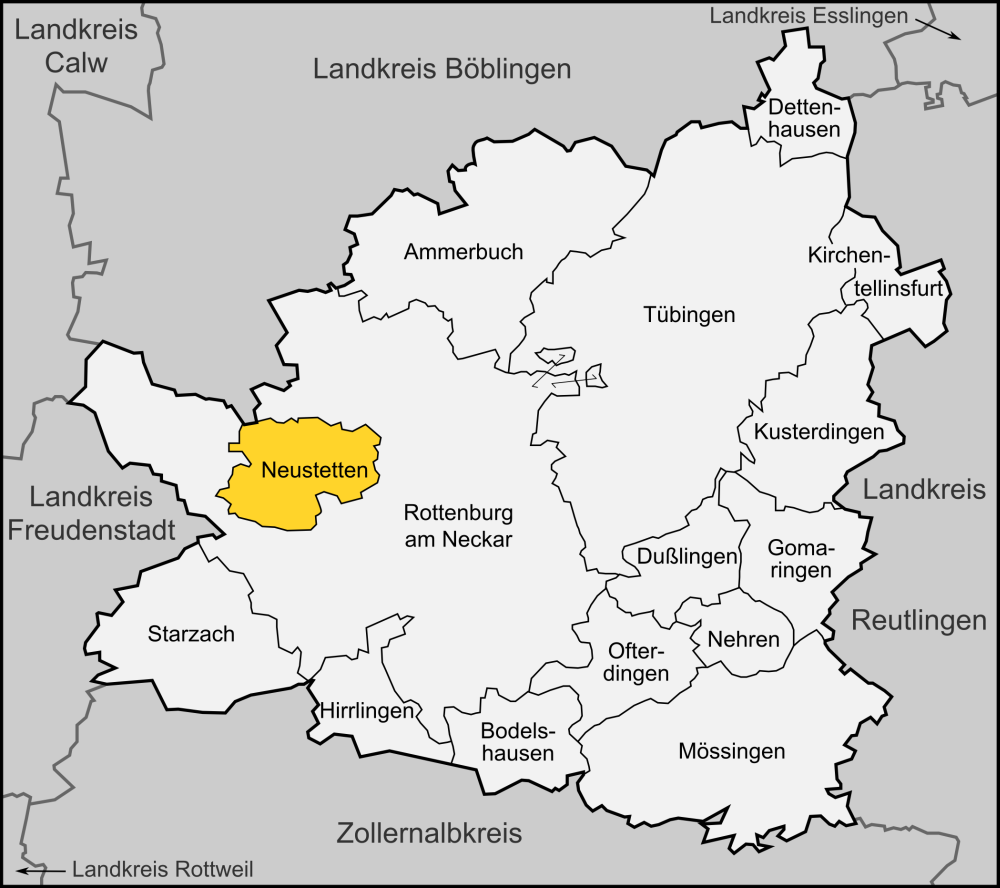
- Location of Neustetten within Tübingen district
- Interactive map of Neustetten
- Location within Germany Location within Baden-Württemberg
- Coordinates: 48°28′58″N 8°52′58″E
- Country: Germany
- State: Baden-Württemberg
- Admin. region: Tübingen
- District: Tübingen
- Subdivisions: 3 Ortsteile

Government
  - Mayor (2020–28): Gunter Schmid

Area
  - Total: 15.88 km^{2} (6.13 sq mi)
- Elevation: 440 m (1,440 ft)

Population (2025-12-31)
  - Total: 3,831
  - Density: 241.2/km^{2} (624.8/sq mi)
- Time zone: UTC+01:00 (CET)
  - Summer (DST): UTC+02:00 (CEST)
- Postal codes: 72149
- Dialling codes: 07457, 07472
- Vehicle registration: TÜ
- Website: www.neustetten.de

Neustetten is a municipality in the district of Tübingen in Baden-Württemberg in Germany. It consists of the three parts Remmingsheim, Nellingsheim and Wolfenhausen.

== Demographics ==
Population development:

Year	Inhabitants
1990	2.599
2001	3.340
2011	3.393
2021	3.758

== Mayors ==
- 1964–2004: Rudolf Maier
- since 2004: Gunter Schmid

== Sons and daughters of the town ==
- Heinrich Christoph Wilhelm Sigwart (1789–1844), born in the district Remmingsheim, General Superintendent of the Evangelical Lutheran Church in Hall, member of Parliament
- Richard Schuh (1920–1949), born in the district Remmingsheim, was the last in West Germany executed criminal
