= Kusterdingen =

- Municipality
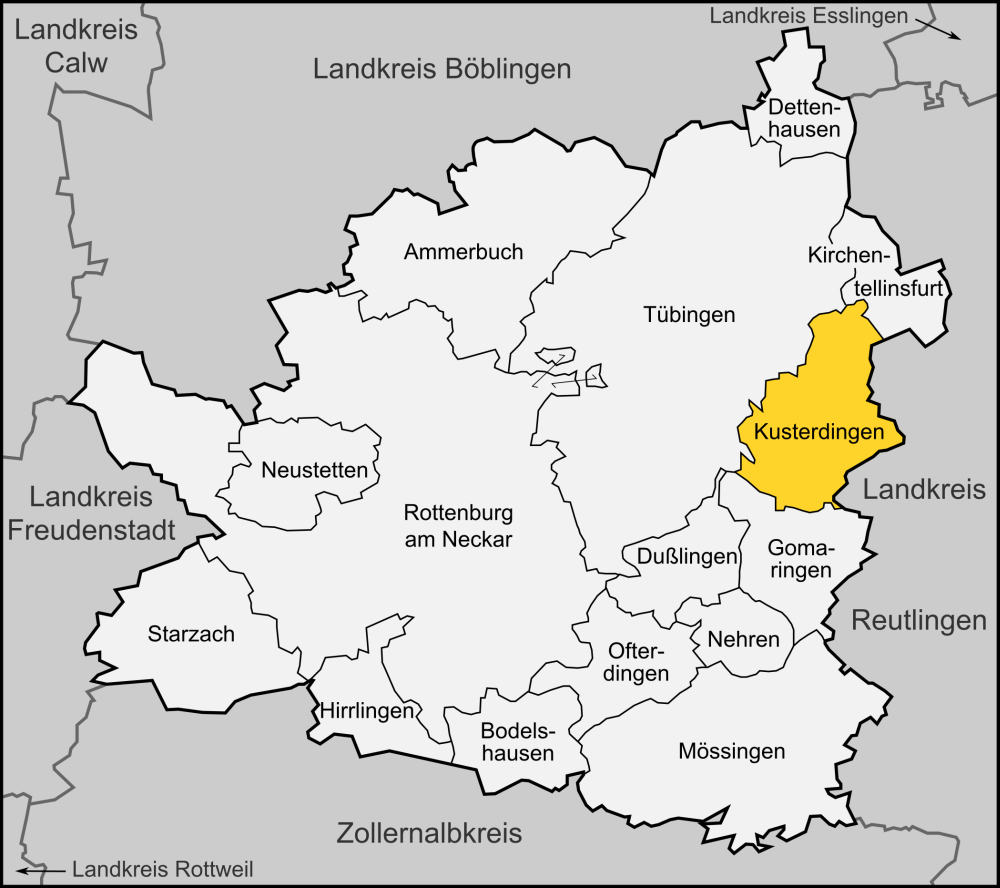
- Location of Kusterdingen within Tübingen district
- Interactive map of Kusterdingen
- Location within Germany Location within Baden-Württemberg
- Coordinates: 48°31′52″N 9°08′54″E
- Country: Germany
- State: Baden-Württemberg
- Admin. region: Tübingen
- District: Tübingen
- Subdivisions: 5 Ortsteile

Government
  - Mayor (2018–26): Jürgen Soltau (Ind.)

Area
  - Total: 24.24 km^{2} (9.36 sq mi)
- Elevation: 405 m (1,329 ft)

Population (2025-12-31)
  - Total: 9,094
  - Density: 375.2/km^{2} (971.7/sq mi)
- Time zone: UTC+01:00 (CET)
  - Summer (DST): UTC+02:00 (CEST)
- Postal codes: 72127
- Dialling codes: 07071
- Vehicle registration: TÜ
- Website: www.kusterdingen.de

Kusterdingen is a municipality in southern Germany in the state of Baden-Württemberg, approximately 30 km south of Stuttgart, in the district of Tübingen.

== Geography ==
It is located on the so-called Härten hills above the Neckar valley, about 3 km east of Tübingen and 4 km northwest of Reutlingen.

=== Neighbouring municipalities ===
The following municipalities, city and town border to the boundary of Kusterdingen (beginning clockwise in the north): Kirchentellinsfurt, Wannweil^{1}, City of Reutlingen^{1}, Gomaringen, Town of Tübingen. The bordering municipalities are part of the district of Tübingen or the district of Reutlingen^{1}.

=== Subdivision ===
The municipality of Kusterdingen is formed by the following five villages:

- Kusterdingen
- Immenhausen
- Jettenburg
- Mähringen
- Wankheim
