= Kirchentellinsfurt =

- Municipality
- Coat of arms

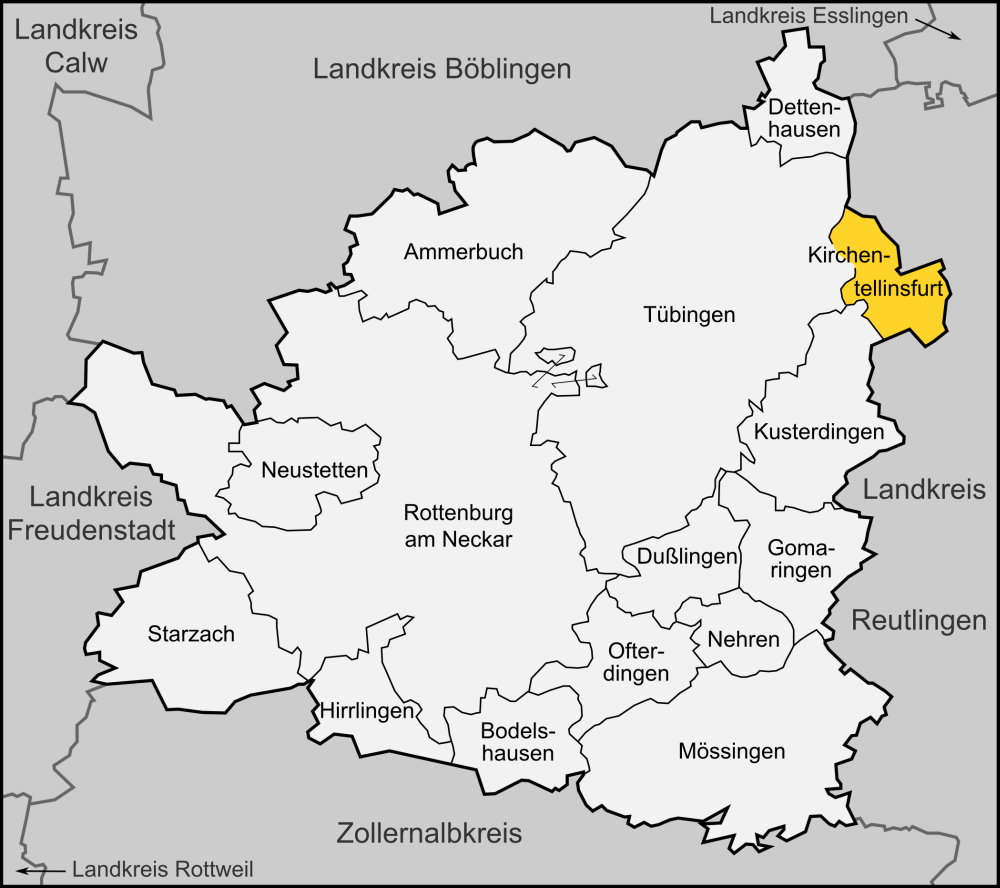
- Location of Kirchentellinsfurt within Tübingen district
- Interactive map of Kirchentellinsfurt
- Location within Germany Location within Baden-Württemberg
- Coordinates: 48°31′52″N 9°08′54″E
- Country: Germany
- State: Baden-Württemberg
- Admin. region: Tübingen
- District: Tübingen

Government
  - Mayor (2022–30): Bernd Haug

Area
  - Total: 11.0 km^{2} (4.2 sq mi)
- Elevation: 383 m (1,257 ft)

Population (2025-12-31)
  - Total: 5,487
  - Density: 499/km^{2} (1,290/sq mi)
- Time zone: UTC+01:00 (CET)
  - Summer (DST): UTC+02:00 (CEST)
- Postal codes: 72138
- Dialling codes: 07121
- Vehicle registration: TÜ
- Website: www.kirchentellinsfurt.de

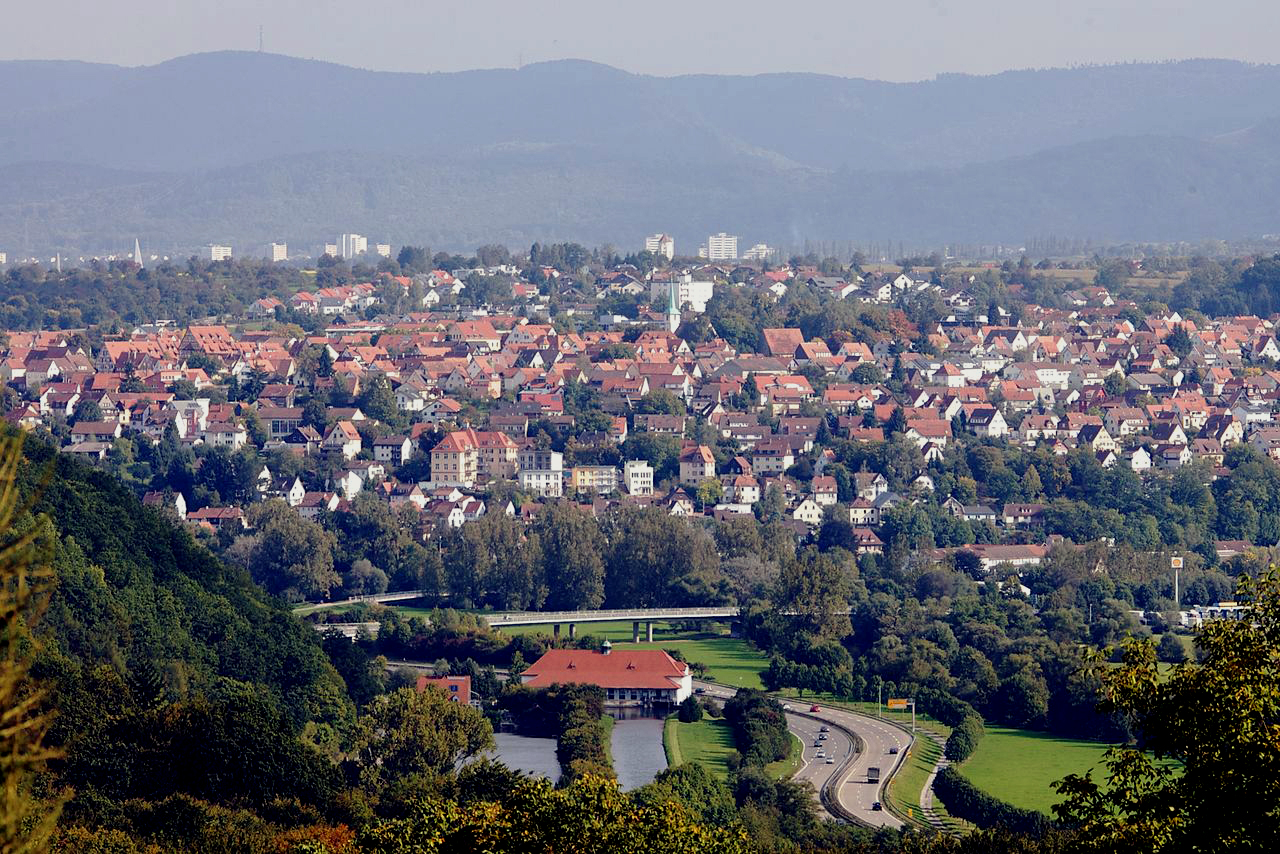
The view of Kirchentellinsfurt from Pfrondorf

Kirchentellinsfurt (Swabian: Kircha) is a municipality in the district of Tübingen in Baden-Württemberg in Germany, about 7 km east of the city of Tübingen and 7 km northwest of Reutlingen. Since 2015, Bernd Haug has been the mayor of Kirchentellinsfurt.

== Geography ==
Kirchentellinsfurt lies next to the river Neckar on the edge of the Schönbuch. Near the village, the Echaz river flows into the Neckar. It borders on the towns Altenburg, Reutlingen, Pliezhausen, Wannweil, Kusterdingen und Tübingen.

== History ==
The two settlements Kirchen and Tälisfurt grew together to form Kirchentellinsfurt. Kirchen was first mentioned 1007 in a treaty when it was given to the Archdiocese of Bamberg as a gift. The fusion of the two villages 1275, was the first time Tellinsfurt was mentioned in documents. The village became Protestant when the first Protestant pastor was appointed in 1594.

In the second half of the 18th century, Charles Eugene, Duke of Württemberg constructed Einsiedel Palace north of Kirchentellinsfurt, but nothing remains anymore today.

Many of the older residents of Ann Arbor, Michigan, emigrated from this section of Germany.

== Demographics ==
Population development:

Year	Inhabitants
1990	5,056
2001	5,335
2011	5,510
2021	5,653

== Politics ==
Town council

The town council consists of 14 elected members and its chairman, the mayor. He can vote in the council.

2019 Election

Freie Wählervereinigung Kirchentellinsfurt	4 seats	28,6 %	2014: 4 seats, 28,8 %
Grün-Alternative Liste (GAL)	4 seats	28,0 %	2014: 3 seats, 20,2 %
SPD	3 seats	18,3 %	2014: 2 seats, 15,3 %
CDU	2 seats	17,4 %	2014: 3 Seats, 22,1 %
Kompetenz für Kirchentellinsfurt (KFK)	1 seat	7,7 %	2014: 0 seats, 0%
RAT, die aktive Bürgerliste	0 seats	0%	2014: 2 seats, 13,6 %

2024 Election

CDU	4 seats	30.2%	2019: 2 Seats, 17,4 %
Grün-Alternative Liste (GAL)	4 seats	27,4 %	2019: 4 seats, 28,0 %
Freie Wählervereinigung Kirchentellinsfurt	4 seats	24,4 %	2019: 4 seats, 28,6 %
SPD	2 seats	17,4 %	2019: 3 seats, 18,3 %

Mayor The mayor is elected for 8 years.

- 1949-1979 Richard Wolf
- 1979-2014 Bernhard Knaus
- since 1. January 2015: Bernd Haug

== Sights ==
- lake: flooded gravel for leisure activities such as swimming, surfing or sailings.
- Schlossmuseum (a museum for local history)
- Roman tombstone
- Celtic ruins (Viereckschanze)
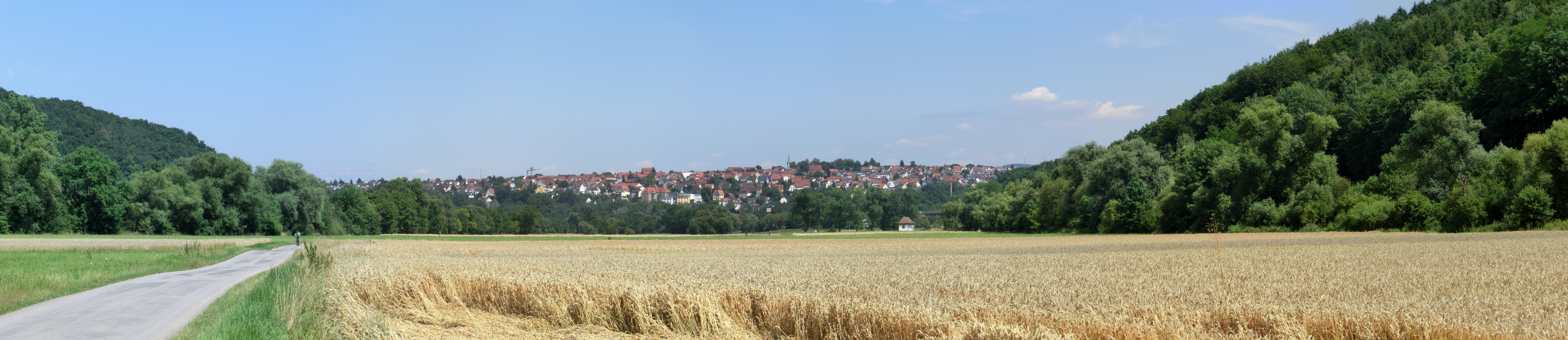
