= 1980 Baden-Württemberg state election =

State election in Germany

- 16 March 1980

All 124 seats in the Landtag of Baden-Württemberg 63 seats needed for a majority
- Turnout: 4,549,463 (71.99%) ▼3.46%
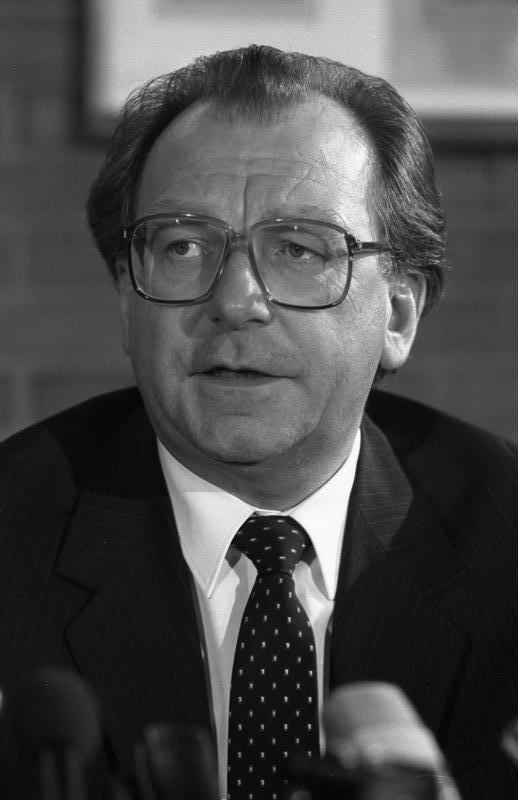

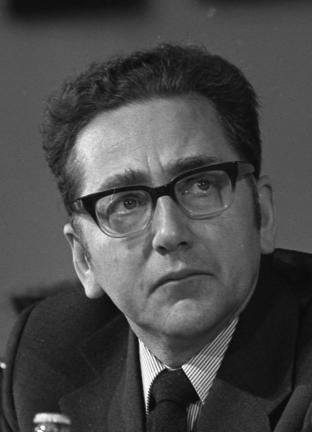

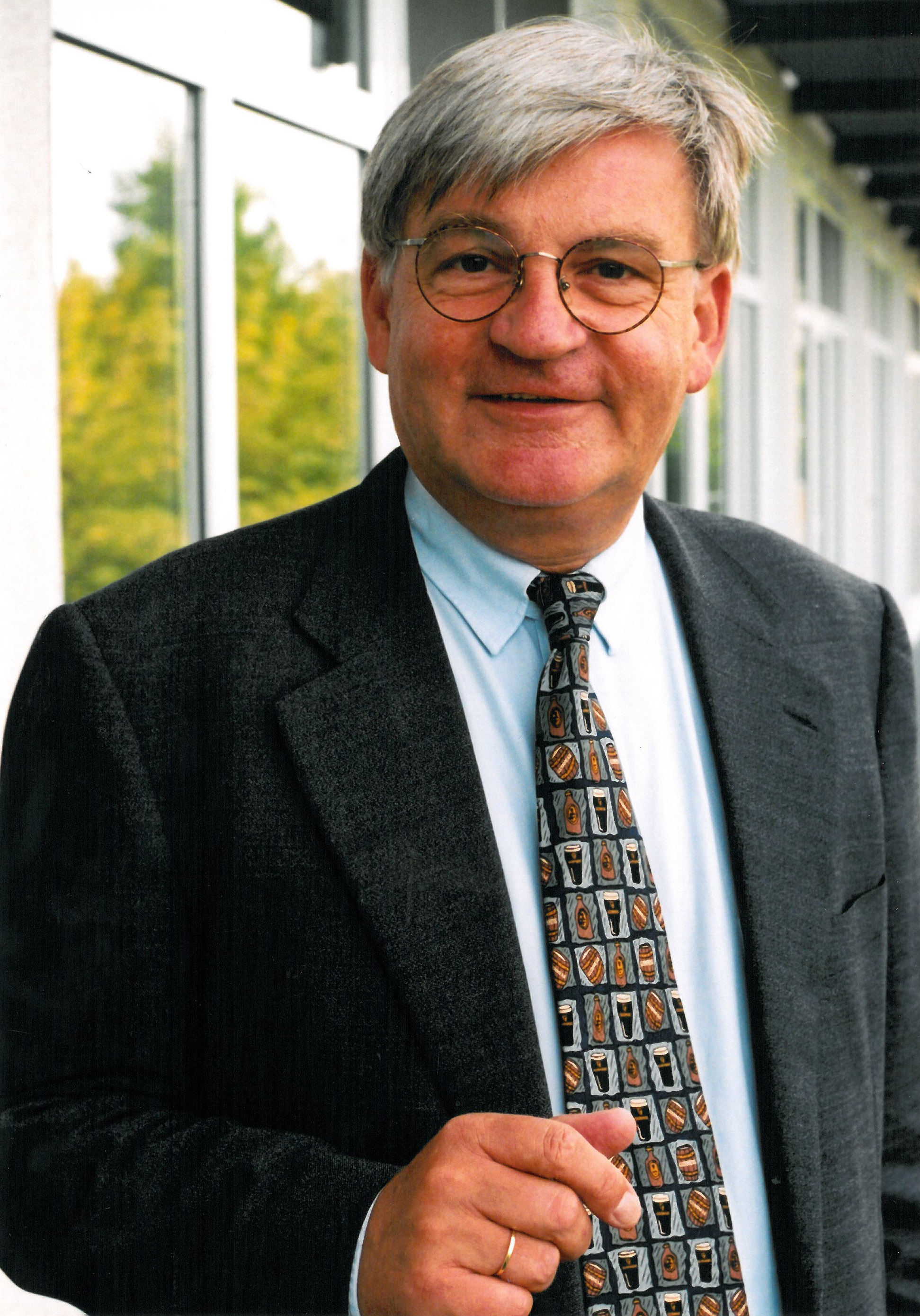
	First party	Second party	Third party
Leader	Lothar Späth	Erhard Eppler	Jürgen Morlok
Party	CDU	SPD	FDP
Last election	71 seats, 56.72%	41 seats, 33.29%	9 seats, 7.80%
Seats won	68	40	10
Seat change	▼3	▼1	▲1
Popular vote	2,407,798	1,468,873	374,633
Percentage	53.35%	32.55%	8.30%
Swing	▼3.37%	▼0.74%	▲0.50%
	Fourth party
Leader	Wolf-Dieter Hasenclever
Party	Greens
Last election	Did not exist
Seats won	6
Seat change	New party
Popular vote	241,303
Percentage	5.35%
Swing	New party
- Results for the single-member constituencies
Minister-President before election
Lothar Späth
CDU
Elected Minister-President
Lothar Späth
CDU

The 1980 Baden-Württemberg state election was held on 16 March 1980 to elect the members of the 7th Landtag of Baden-Württemberg. The incumbent Christian Democratic Union (CDU) government under Minister-President Lothar Späth was re-elected, retaining its majority. The election also marked the first time that the Greens were elected at either the state or federal level in Germany after being established as a nationwide party in January 1980, having previously secured four seats in Bremen's October 1979 election.

== Parties ==
The table below lists parties represented in the previous Landtag of Baden-Württemberg.

Name		Ideology	Leader(s)	1980 result	
Name		Ideology	Leader(s)	Votes (%)	Seats
CDU	Christian Democratic Union of Germany; Christlich Demokratische Union Deutschlands	Christian democracy	Lothar Späth	56.72%	71 / 121
SPD	Social Democratic Party of Germany; Sozialdemokratische Partei Deutschlands	Social democracy	Erhard Eppler	33.29%	41 / 121
FDP	Free Democratic Party; Freie Demokratische Partei	Classical liberalism	Jürgen Morlok	7.80%	9 / 121
Grüne	The Greens; Die Grünen	Green politics	Wolf-Dieter Hasenclever	N/A	Did not exist

== Results ==
Summary of the 16 March 1980 election results for the Landtag of Baden-Württemberg
Party	Votes	%	+/-	Seats	+/-	Seats %
Christian Democratic Union (CDU)	2,407,798	53.35	▼3.37	68	▼3	54.84
Social Democratic Party (SPD)	1,468,873	32.55	▼0.71	40	▼1	33.06
Free Democratic Party (FDP)	374,633	8.30	▲0.50	10	▲1	8.26
The Greens (Grüne)	241,303	5.35	▲5.35	6	▲6	4.96
German Communist Party (DKP)	11,738	0.26	▼0.20	0	±0	0
National Democratic Party (NPD)	2,341	0.05	▼0.85	0	±0	0
Communist League	2,076	0.05	▼0.05	0	±0	0
European Workers' Party	152	0.00	0.00	0	±0	0
Free German Workers' Party	69	0.00	New	0	±0	0
Total	4,513,009	99.20		124	▲3	
Invalid votes	36,454	0.80				
Voter turnout	4,549,463	71.99	▼3.46			
