= Roßberg (Swabian Jura) =

Mountain in Baden-Württemberg, Germany

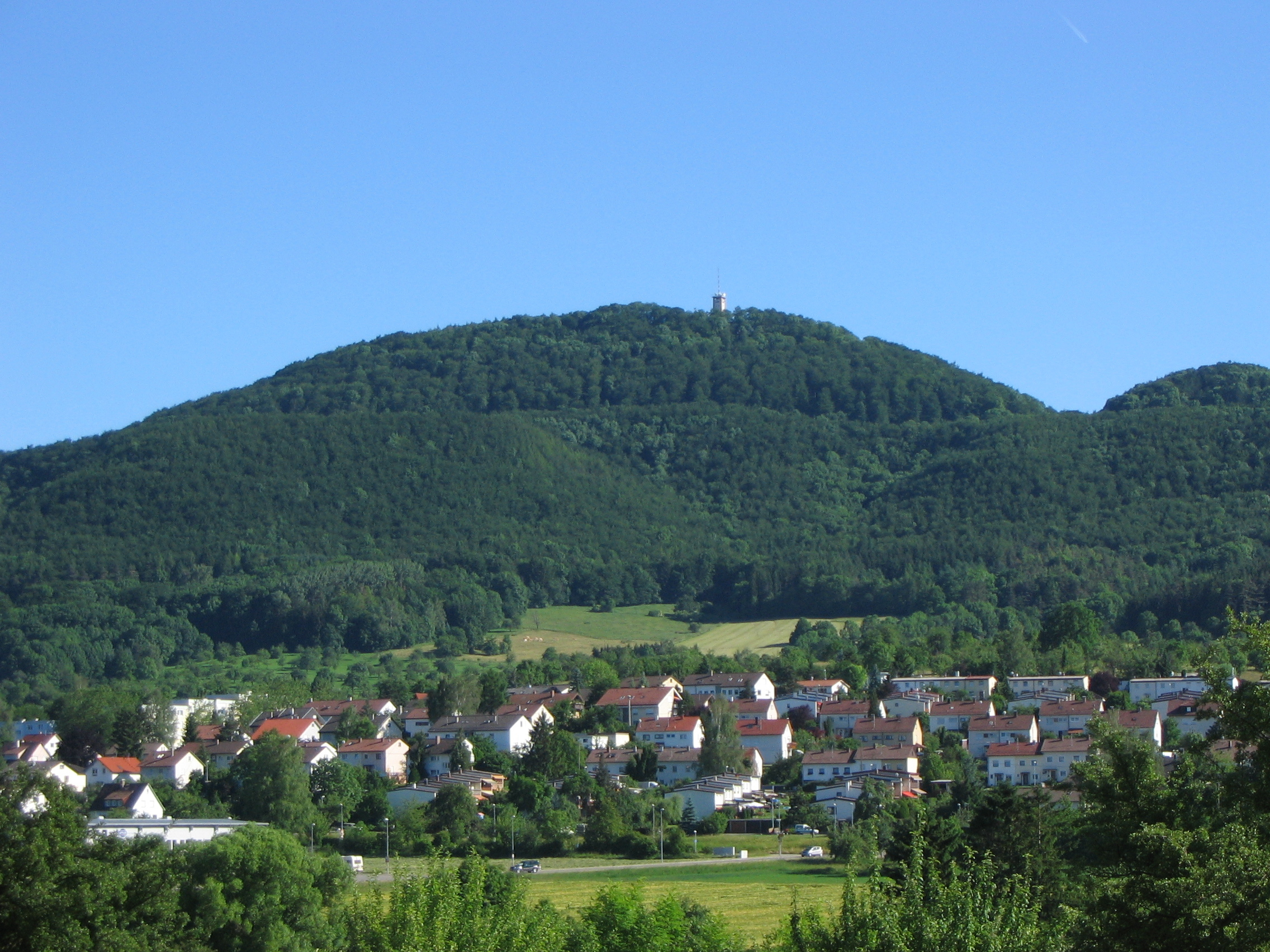
- Roßberg seen from the north, Gönningen in the foreground

Highest point
- Elevation: 869 m (2,851 ft)
- Coordinates: 48°25′04″N 09°08′34″E

Geography
- Location within Baden-Württemberg
- Location: Baden-Württemberg, Germany

The Roßberg is a mountain in Baden-Württemberg, Germany.
