= Tübingen (district) =

Coordinates: 48.52°N 9.05°E

- District
- Flag Coat of arms
- Country: Germany
- State: Baden-Württemberg
- Adm. region: Tübingen
- Capital: Tübingen

Government
  - District admin.: Joachim Walter (CDU)

Area
  - Total: 519.13 km^{2} (200.44 sq mi)

Population (31 December 2022)
  - Total: 232,803
  - Density: 450/km^{2} (1,200/sq mi)
- Time zone: UTC+01:00 (CET)
  - Summer (DST): UTC+02:00 (CEST)
- Vehicle registration: TÜ
- Website: www.kreis-tuebingen.de

Tübingen is a Landkreis (district) in the middle of Baden-Württemberg, Germany. Neighboring districts are (from north clockwise) Böblingen, Reutlingen, Zollernalbkreis and Freudenstadt.

== History ==
The district dates back to the Oberamt Tübingen in the state of Württemberg. In 1811 the Oberamt Rottenburg was created, and both were converted into districts in 1934. In 1938 most of the district Rottenburg as well as a few municipalities from the district Herrenberg and Reutlingen were added to the district Tübingen. In 1974 it was enlarged again when some municipalities from the dissolved district Horb were added.

== Geography ==
The main river in the district is the Neckar. The landscapes covered by the district are called Oberer Gäu and Schönbuch.

== Coat of arms ==
The coat of arms show the banner (gonfalon) of the Counts of Tübingen. In contrast to the coat of arms of the city Tübingen, it is depicted on a spear. The red-and-white colors are chosen to represent the County Hohenberg, which belonged to Austria.

== Towns and municipalities ==
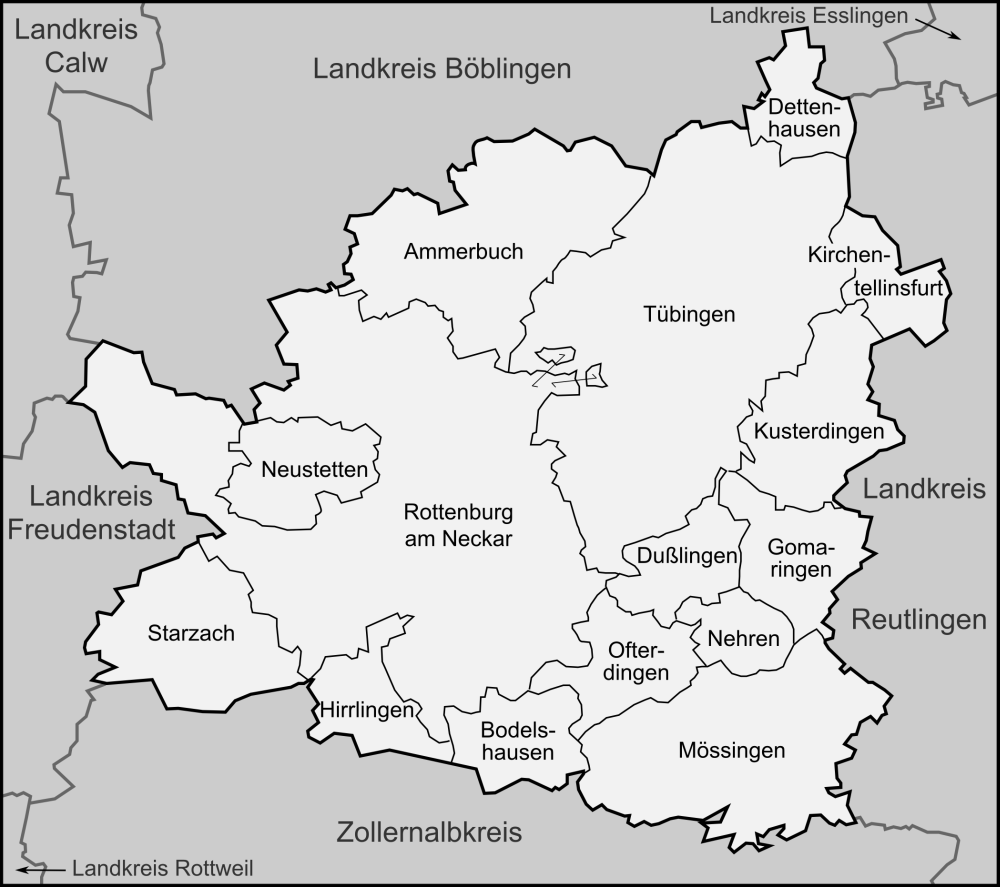
Clickable map of towns and municipalities in the district

Towns	Municipalities
1. Mössingen; 2. Rottenburg am Neckar; 3. Tübingen	1. Ammerbuch; 2. Bodelshausen; 3. Dettenhausen; 4. Dußlingen; 5. Gomaringen; 6. Hirrlingen; 7. Kirchentellinsfurt; 8. Kusterdingen; 9. Nehren; 10. Neustetten; 11. Ofterdingen; 12. Starzach
Verwaltungsgemeinschaften	1. Ammerbuch; 2. Bodelshausen; 3. Dettenhausen; 4. Dußlingen; 5. Gomaringen; 6. Hirrlingen; 7. Kirchentellinsfurt; 8. Kusterdingen; 9. Nehren; 10. Neustetten; 11. Ofterdingen; 12. Starzach
1. Steinlach-Wiesaz; 2. Mössingen; 3. Rottenburg	1. Ammerbuch; 2. Bodelshausen; 3. Dettenhausen; 4. Dußlingen; 5. Gomaringen; 6. Hirrlingen; 7. Kirchentellinsfurt; 8. Kusterdingen; 9. Nehren; 10. Neustetten; 11. Ofterdingen; 12. Starzach
