= Ofterdingen =

- Municipality
- Flag Coat of arms

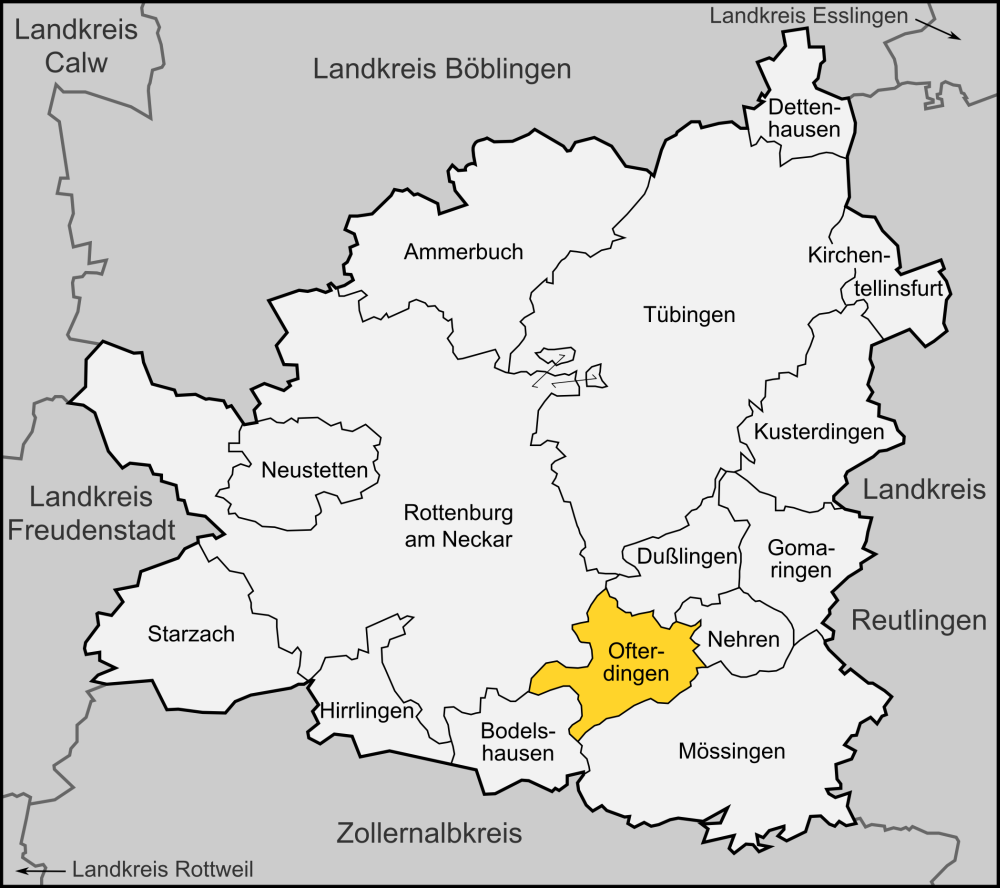
- Location of Ofterdingen within Tübingen district
- Interactive map of Ofterdingen
- Location within Germany Location within Baden-Württemberg
- Coordinates: 48°25′13″N 9°01′55″E
- Country: Germany
- State: Baden-Württemberg
- Admin. region: Tübingen
- District: Tübingen

Government
  - Mayor (2018–26): Joseph Reichert

Area
  - Total: 15.15 km^{2} (5.85 sq mi)
- Elevation: 424 m (1,391 ft)

Population (2025-12-31)
  - Total: 5,470
  - Density: 361/km^{2} (935/sq mi)
- Time zone: UTC+01:00 (CET)
  - Summer (DST): UTC+02:00 (CEST)
- Postal codes: 72131
- Dialling codes: 07473
- Vehicle registration: TÜ
- Website: www.ofterdingen.de

Ofterdingen is a municipality in the district of Tübingen in Baden-Württemberg in Germany.
