= Dußlingen =

- Municipality
- Coat of arms

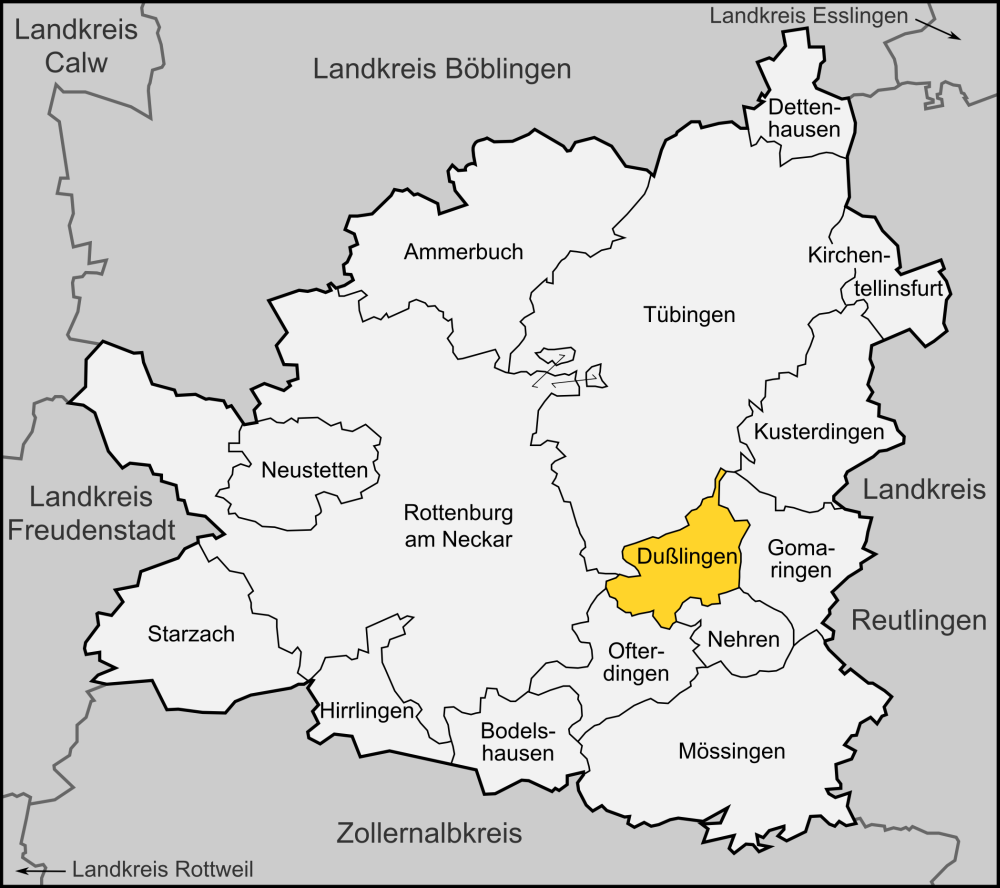
- Location of Dußlingen within Tübingen district
- Interactive map of Dußlingen
- Location within Germany Location within Baden-Württemberg
- Coordinates: 48°27′03″N 9°03′39″E
- Country: Germany
- State: Baden-Württemberg
- Admin. region: Tübingen
- District: Tübingen

Government
  - Mayor (2019–27): Thomas Hölsch

Area
  - Total: 13.06 km^{2} (5.04 sq mi)
- Elevation: 379 m (1,243 ft)

Population (2025-12-31)
  - Total: 6,186
  - Density: 473.7/km^{2} (1,227/sq mi)
- Time zone: UTC+01:00 (CET)
  - Summer (DST): UTC+02:00 (CEST)
- Postal codes: 72144
- Dialling codes: 07072
- Vehicle registration: TÜ
- Website: www.dusslingen.de

Dußlingen is a municipality in the district of Tübingen in Baden-Württemberg in Germany. The village was named for the first time in the records as 'villa Tuzzilinga' in the year 888. By 1135 it was called Tuzzelingen, in 1216 it was called Tusselingen. The name itself comes from the personal name Tuzzilo, and the -ingen is an old Alemannic suffix. Dußlingen has a rich history, proven by artifacts that have been found from the stone age, the Hallstatt age, Latene period, and Roman era.

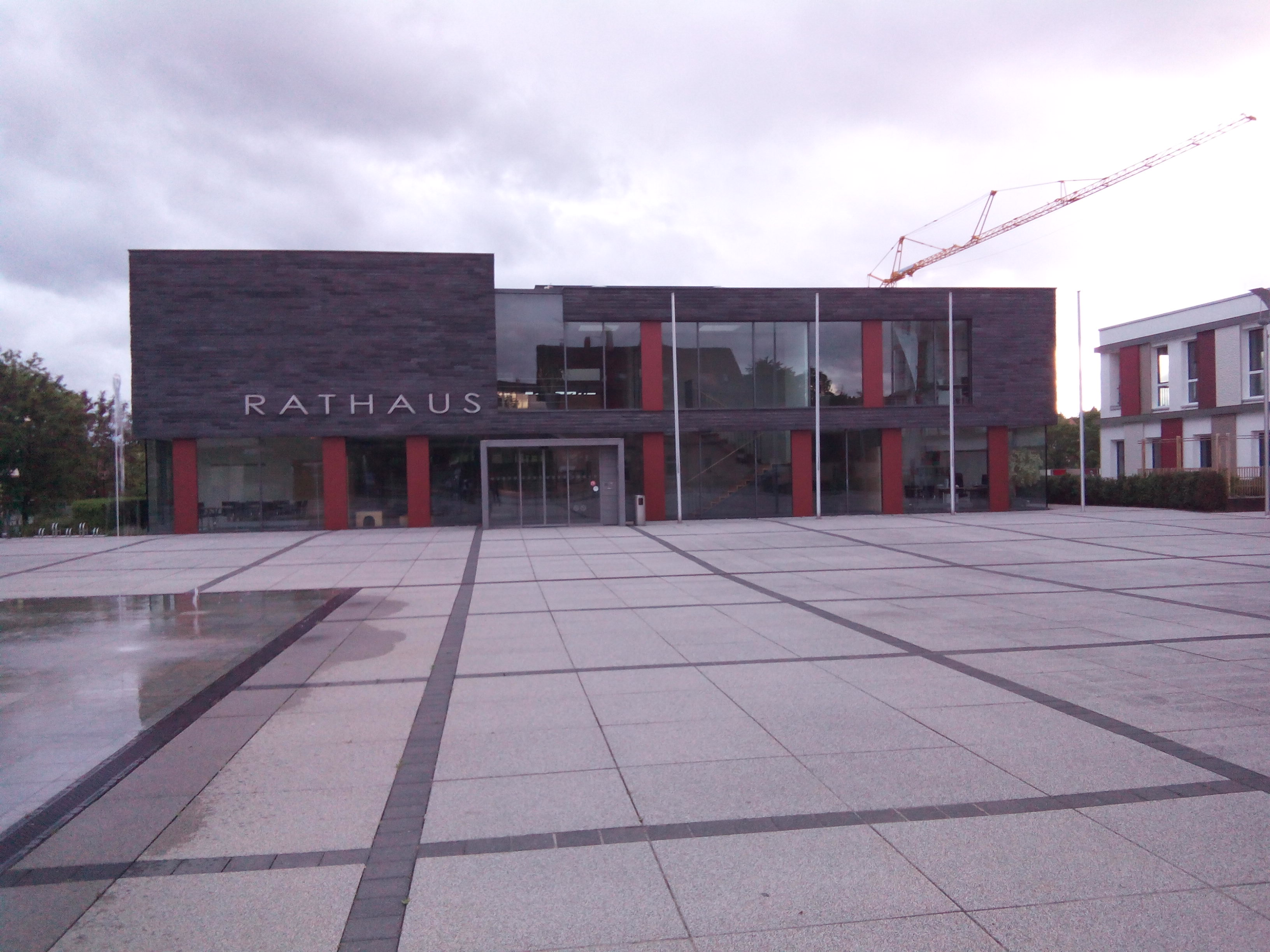
Dußlingen municipality

Like other villages in medieval times, the income from the church and from the farms was distributed to a series of nobles, typically as rewards or in payment for fealty and service. The Knights of Dußlingen were subjects of the Count of Tübingen, and seem to have flourished in the period from 1250 to 1400. They took on the family name of Herter (surnames just coming into vogue during that time), and passed the village property on from generation to generation. The Herters also performed the duties of pastor to the village. Apparently falling on hard times, Jacob Herter and his nephew Hans sold the village to Count Ludwig of Württemberg in 1446.

However, Jacob's son Wilhelm ended up getting the property back as a fief because of his stature in the Württemberg court. When he died in 1477 in Basel, Switzerland, he was lauded as "brave Knight Wilhelm Herter of Tübingen, large of body, large of knowledge and wisdom and eloquence, mourned by all, by lordship and noblemen and common folk." The Herter family retained its fief until the death of their last male heir in 1614, just prior to the time when Dußlingen's church records start.

There used to be a castle in Dußlingen. A part of the wall which surrounded the old castle on the north edge of the village still remains today. It is incorporated into the foundation of the large old timber frame house that was formerly the mayor's house and town hall. Part of the castle moat is still visible today. Still remaining are enormous square foundation stones from the 13th century. A slight bend in the wall seems to point to a polygonal shape, similar to the old Castle of Kilchberg.

== Notable residents ==
- Friedrich Herter von Dußlingen (1314-1359), Württembergian knight

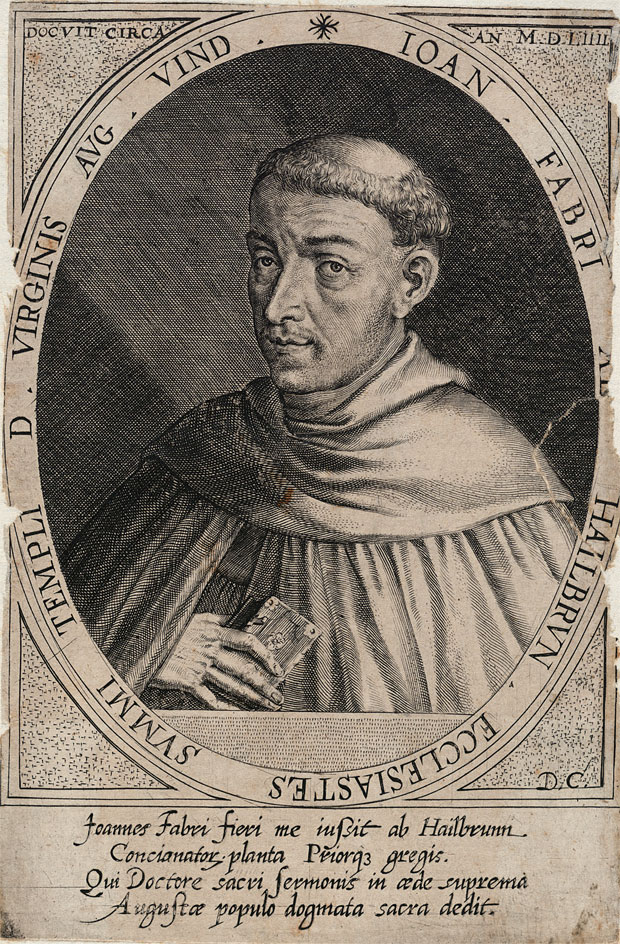
Johann Faber of Heilbronn

- Johannes Fabri (1571-1620), physician and professor at the University of Tübingen
- Wilhelm Herter von Hertneck (1424-1477), knight
- Werner Raupp, (born 1955), historian (now residing in Hohenstein-Ödenwaldstetten)
