= Neckarfront =

Landmark in Tübingen, Germany

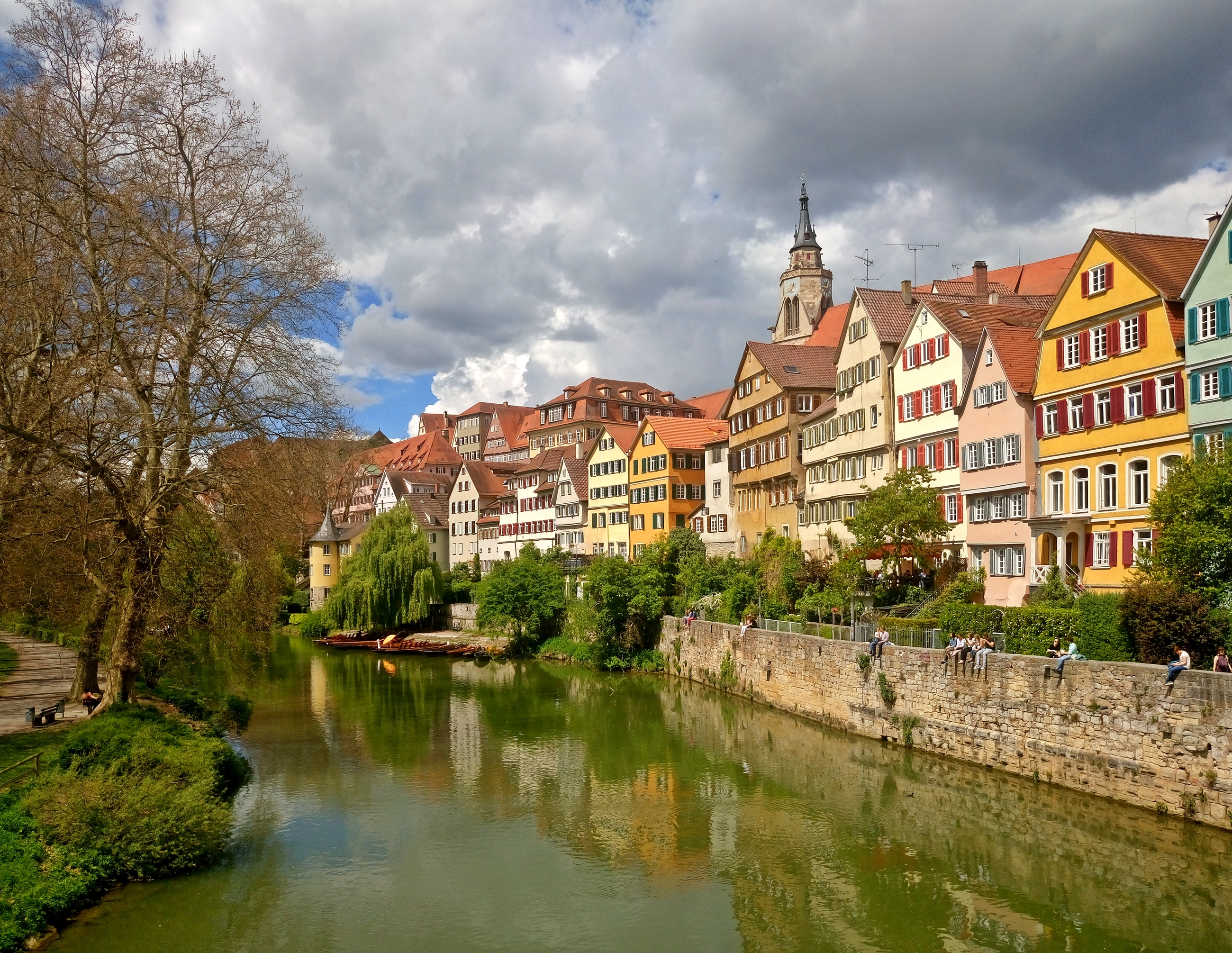
The Neckarfront with Hölderlinturm behind, seen from Eberhard Bridge

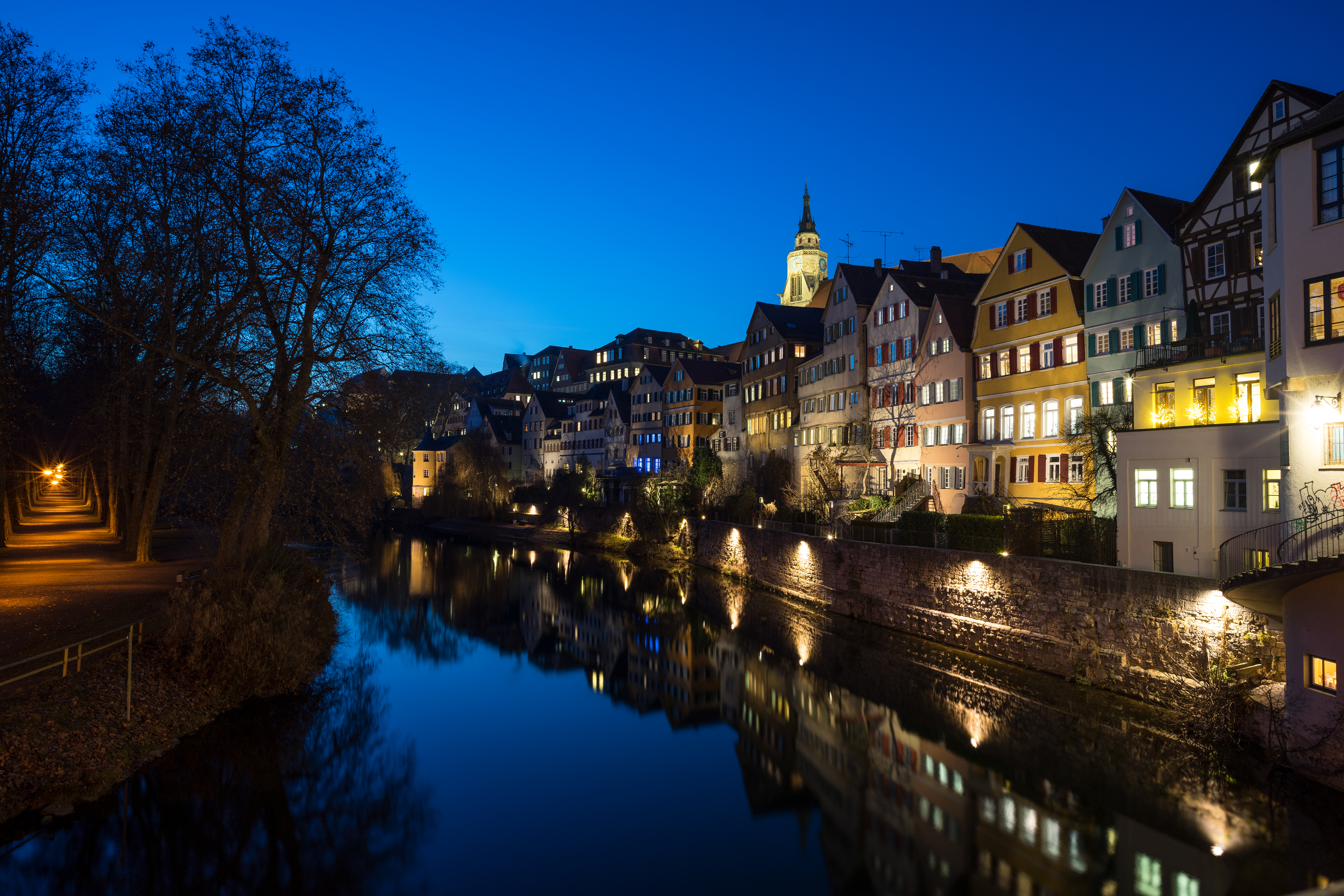
The Neckarfront at night

The Neckarfront is one of the most famous places and a heritage tourist attraction in Tübingen, Germany. It is an ensemble of multi-storey, gabled residential buildings on the Neckar river between the Eberhard Bridge over the river, and upriver the characteristic sight Hölderlinturm with the punt boat pier. This the southern side the houses share with the same still partially existing city wall. Overall the historic scenery above the Neckar river and the tower of the collegiate Church on top, behind the buildings are Neckargasse and Bursagasse. The address Bursagasse 16 is the Tübingen Room Theater "Zimmertheater Tübingen".

Upriver the Neckarfront is in direct sight as well as Alte Burse, Tübinger Stift, and a row of inline houses along the Neckarhalde. It is dominated by Castle Hohentübingen.

Between Eberhardsbrücke and Hölderlinturm a pedestrian walk is along the Neckar front, beside a mighty wall. The walls summit is during summer a popular place for students.

The best view of the Neckarfront provides the Eberhard Bridge and the Platanenallee on the Neckarinsel directly opposing the river.
