= Johannes Brassicanus =

Johannes Brassicanus may refer to:

- Johannes Brassicanus (humanist) (1475–1514), German humanist and scholar
- Johann Alexander Brassicanus (c. 1500–1539), Austrian jurist
- Johann Ludwig Brassicanus (1509–1549), Austrian jurist
- Johannes Brassicanus (composer) (c. 1570–1634), Austrian composer and poet
