= Ottilie Wildermuth =

German Swabian author and children's writer of the 19th century

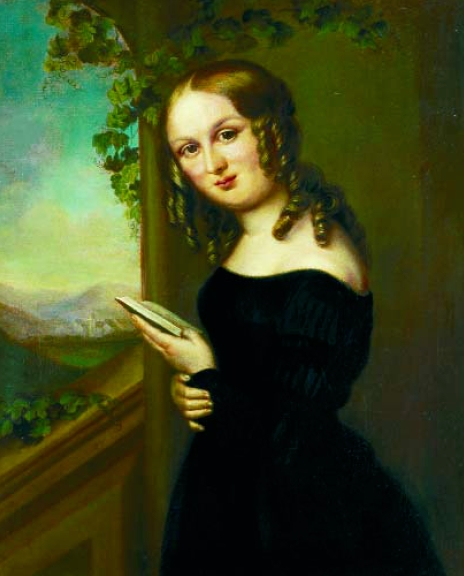
- Portrait by Sophie Pilgrem, 1835
- Born: 22 February 1817; Rottenburg am Neckar, Kingdom of Württemberg
- Died: 12 July 1877 (aged 60); Tübingen, German Empire
- Occupation: Writer

Ottilie Wildermuth (German: [ˈvɪldɐˌmuːt]; née Rooschüz; 22 February 1817 in Rottenburg am Neckar – 12 July 1877 in Tübingen) was a German writer, particularly notable for her children's books.

== Life ==
Ottilie Rooschüz was the daughter of Gottlob Christian Rooschüz (1785–1847), a Kriminalrat (and from 1819 an Oberamtsrichter) from Marbach am Neckar, and his wife Leonore (1796–1874, née Scholl). She showed a strong thirst for knowledge early in life and wrote her own stories and poems. In summer 1833 she was allowed to spend six months studying in Stuttgart. In 1843, aged 26, she married the 36-year-old philologist Wilhelm David Wildermuth (1807–1885). After time as a private tutor in France and England, Wilhelm Wildermuth then moved to be a professor of modern languages in the Lyzeum (now the Gymnasium) in Tübingen. Ottilie formed the women of Tübingen into a salon, which she belonged to herself for 34 years until her death. From the very beginning the young couple were friends with Ludwig Uhland and his wife, the poet Karl Mayer's family, Klüpfl-Schwab and later several university professors. Her varied education also allowed Ottilie to participate in her husband's work - like him, she taught English. They had five children between 1844 and 1856, with three, Agnes, Adelheid, and Hermann, surviving to adulthood.

In 1847 she sent her first story Die alte Jungfer to the Morgenblatt. Once this had been accepted for publication, she wrote more stories, short stories, novels, biographies, family books, children's history books and idyllic accounts of Protestant Swabian life, in whose circles she moved. Her stories met a public taste and she was printed in the widely read family periodicals such as Daheim and Die Gartenlaube, which made her known to other contemporary writers. In 1870, she founded the children's magazine Jugendgarten, later continued by her daughters Agnes Willms and Adelheid Wildermuth. In 1871, Ottilie Wildermuth received the great gold medal for Art and Science in Württemberg. In her fiftieth year her health was strongly attacked by a nervous disorder, and in July 1877, aged 60, she died of a stroke. She is buried in the Stadtfriedhof in Tübingen, with a monument dedicated to her on the Tübinger Neckarinsel

== Works ==
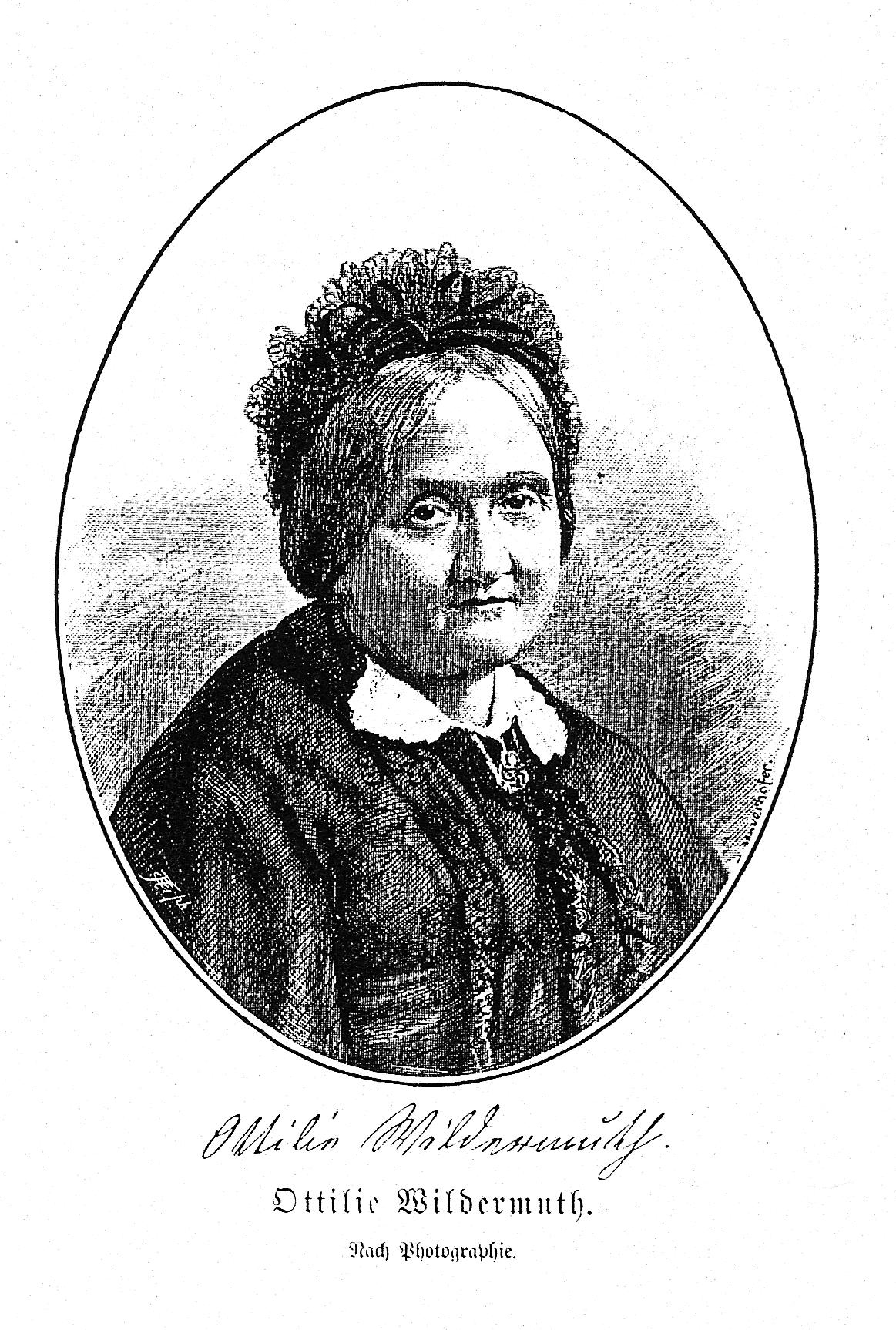
Ottilie Wildermuth

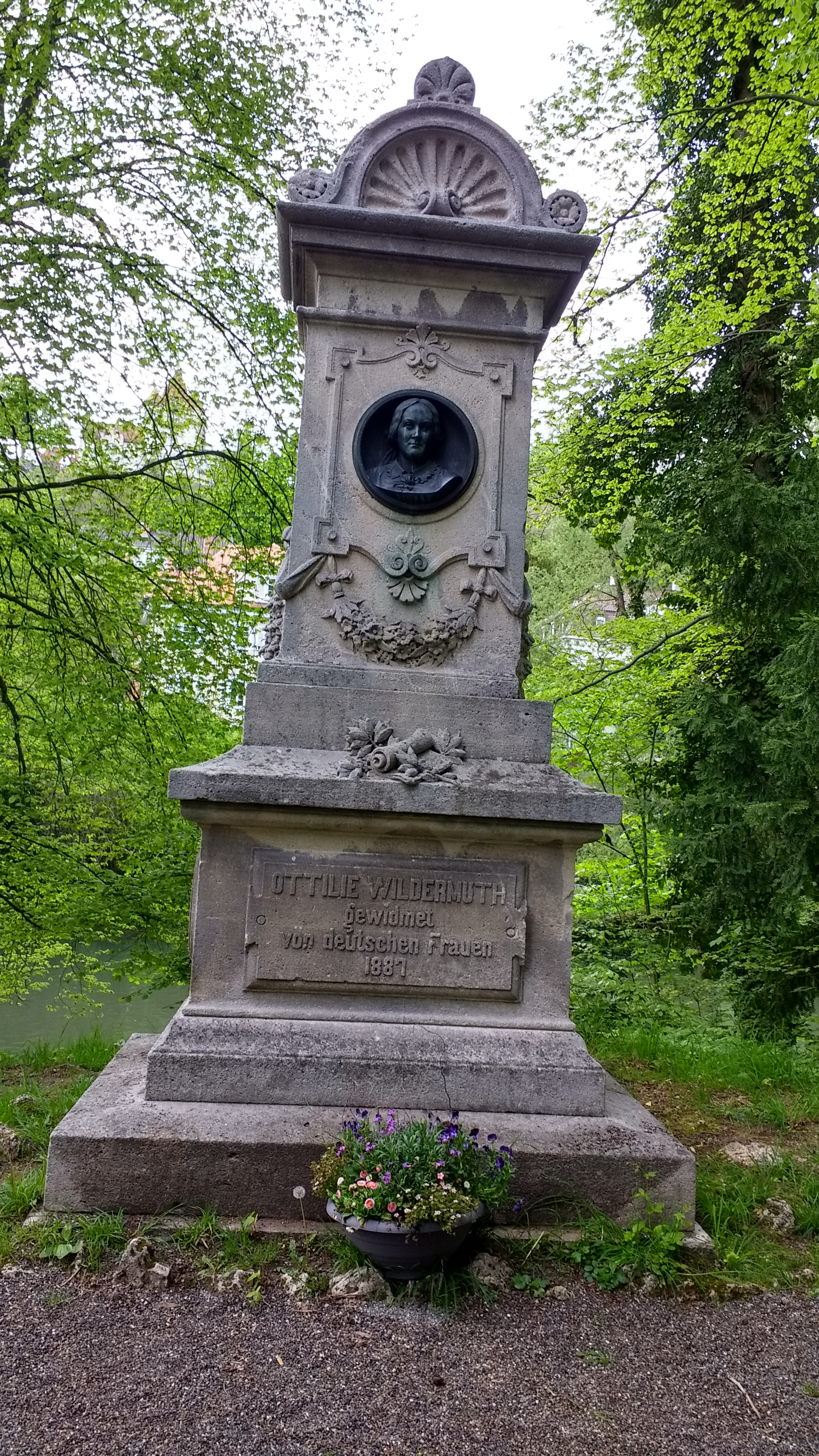
Ottilie Wildermuth memorial in Tübingen

- Bilder und Geschichten aus dem schwäbischen Leben, 1852
- Neue Bilder und Geschichten aus Schwaben, 1854
- Aus der Kinderwelt, 1854
- Aus dem Frauenleben, 1855
- Erzählungen und Märchen, 1856
- Die Heimath der Frau, 1859
- Im Tageslichte. Bilder aus der Wirklichkeit, 1861
- Aus Schloß und Hütte, 1861
- Lebensräthsel, gelöste und ungelöste, 1863
- Perlen aus dem Sande, 1867
- Zur Dämmerstunde, 1871
- Aus Nord und Süd, 1874
- Ottilie Wildermuths Werke. 4 volumes. Stuttgart: Krabbe 1862
- Eine seltsame Schule - Bärbeles Weihnachten, c. 1900

== Bibliography ==
- (in German) Ottilie Wildermuth’s Leben. Nach ihren eigenen Aufzeichnungen zusammengestellt und ergänzt von Agnes Willms und Adelheid Wildermuth. Kröner, Stuttgart 1888
- (in German) Maria Pfadt: Ottilie Wildermuth. Profile ihrer Kinder- und Jugendliteratur. Dissertation, PH Ludwigsburg 1994
- (in German) Rosemarie Wildermuth (Bearb.): Ottilie Wildermuth 1817-1877. Ausstellungskatalog. (= Marbacher Magazin; 37/1986). Schiller-Nationalmuseum Marbach, Marbach am Neckar 1986
- (in German) Rosemarie Wildermuth (Hrsg.): „Verehrte Freundin! Wo sind Sie?“ Justinus Kerners Briefwechsel mit Ottilie Wildermuth 1853-1862. Mit einem Vorwort von Bernhard Zeller. Lithos, Stuttgart 1996, ISBN 3-88480-022-1
- (in German) Vera Vollmer: Baden-Württembergische Portraits, Frauengestalten aus fünf Jahrhunderten (Hrsg. von Elisabeth Noelle-Neumann). Deutsche Verlags-Anstalt, Stuttgart 1999, ISBN 3-421-05271-9, S. 122–127.
