= Johann Alexander Brassicanus =

German humanist

Johann Alexander Brassicanus (c.1500 – 25 November 1539) was a German Catholic humanist, author and prominent professor.

== Family and early life ==
Brassicanus is thought to have been born in Cannstatt around 1500 as a member of an ancient family of Konstanz, named Köl or Köll, Latinized Brassicanus (both meaning 'cabbage'). His father was Johannes Brassicanus, the Württemberg humanist who taught in the Latin school at Urach up to 1508, and later in the pedagogium at Tübingen, but was chiefly known as a leader in the movement for the promotion of the humanities and as the author of a grammar then widely used, "Institutiones grammaticae", thirteen editions of which were issued between 1508 and 1519. From his father, who died at Wildaad in 1514, Johann Alexander received an excellent education, which brought his intellectual powers to at early maturity, enabling him to matriculate at the University of Tübingen 13 January 1514 and take his degree as Master of Arts in 1517.

His younger brother was Johann Ludwig Brassicanus, an advisor to the Habsburgs.

== Literary work ==
About the time of his graduation, he first gave evidence of his fertile poetic powers, and in 1518, he received the title of Poeta et orator laureatus. His coronation as poet must have taken place early in 1518, Emperor Maximilian at the same time granting him a coat of arms. The greatest humanists of the time kept in correspondence with Brassicanus and praised his intellectual powers. He lectured for a short time before the Faculty of Arts on the Latin poets; he also edited the eclogues of Calpurnius and Nemesianus which he had discovered.

== Career ==
When, after Bebel's death in 1516, a reaction once more set in against humanism, he availed himself of the first opportunity to absent himself temporarily from the scene of his former labours. In 1519, he attached himself to the suite of the royal orator Maximilian von Bergen, who was sent on various diplomatic missions by the king. After a sojourn in the Netherlands (1520) Brassicanus returned to Tübingen (1621) to pursue his study of law in connection with his work as a teacher. In this way he was brought into intimate relations with Ingolstadt, he received there the degree of Doctor of Laws, also succeeding Reuchlin in the important chair of philology (1522).

Due to his sympathies with Martin Luther, Brassicanus's position in the heavily Catholic university of Tübingen became untenable. With the help of Johann Faber and Johann Camers, he obtained a position at the University of Vienna as professor of rhetoric in 1524. He later became a professor of jurisprudence there, and in 1528, he additionally received the chair of Greek literature.

Due to influence from Faber and Camers, and study of the Church Fathers, Brassicanus's opinions on Luther became increasingly negative. He was particularly exercised over the disastrous influence of Lutheranism on educational activities.

== Later life ==
On the appearance of the Turks before Vienna (1529) he fled his native city, where he remained for a considerable period of time. The succeeding years are marked by his editions of the Fathers and the classics. Often in poor health, he died at the prime of life at Vienna on 25 November 1539, leaving only a very extensive library, as his material resources had at all times been meagre.

== Works ==
His writings give no clear conception of his intellectual importance which his contemporaries found so noteworthy.

Among his works of independent authorship are:

- Oratio ad principes post obitum Maximiliani (1519)
- Caesar (1519)
- In divum Carolum electum Romanorum regem (1519)
- other occasional poems and addresses

These do not rise above the average level of the occasional literature of humanism. No subtler meaning and no original or striking thoughts are concealed under the mediocre forms of expression. For the history of the University of Vienna, on the contrary, Brassicanus is of great importance, being numbered among the most vigorous representatives of the humanist movement.

Among the editions issued by Brassicanus, these are well known:

- Luciani Samosatensis Traegoediae (1527)
- Salviani, De vero judicio et providentiâ Dei, particularly famous for its praefatio about the Corvina library (Basle, 1530)
- Gennadius, De sinceritate christianae fidei dialogus seu de via salutis humanae (Vienna, 1530)
- Enchiridion de christianarum rerum memoria sive epitome historiae ecclesiasticae per Eusebium descriptae auctore Haymone (Hagenau, 1531)
- Salonii Dialogi duo (ibid., 1532)
- Pothonis, De statu domus Dei
- Pothonis, De magna domo sapientiae (ibid., 1532)
