= Neckarinsel, Tübingen =

Island in the Neckar River, Germany

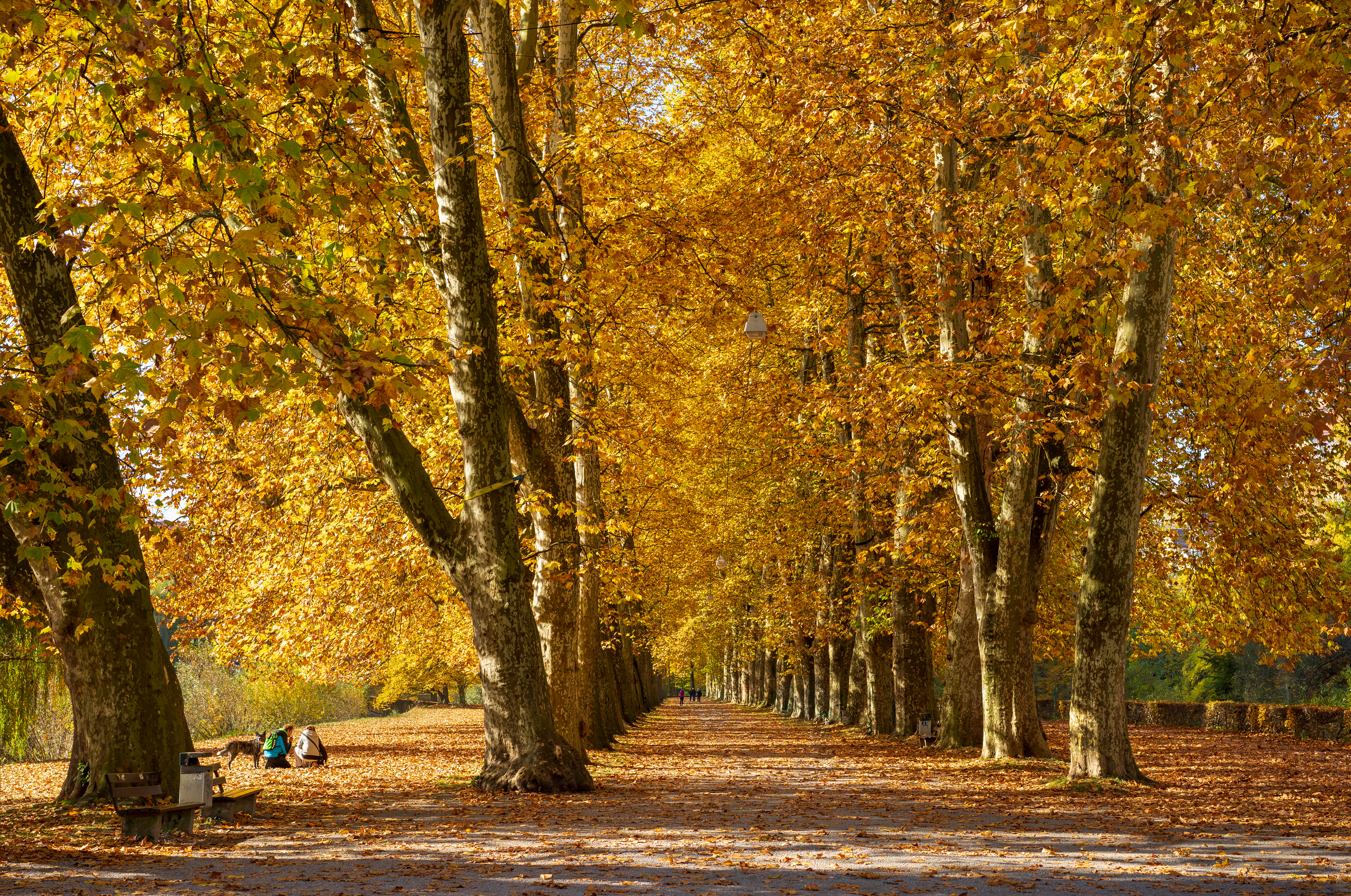
- Platanenallee (Plane Tree Alley) on the south bank of the island

- Location within Germany

Geography
- Location: Neckar
- Coordinates: 48°31′04″N 09°03′07″E
- Adjacent to: Neckar
- Area: 0.05 km^{2} (0.019 sq mi)
- Length: 1 km (0.6 mi)
- Width: 0.05 km (0.031 mi)
- Highest elevation: 2 m (7 ft)

Administration
- Baden-Württemberg

The Neckarinsel (Neckar Island) in Tübingen, Germany is an artificial, 2/3-mile (1.1 km) long Neckar river island, which was created in the years 1910 and 1911 by branching off a parallel channel to regulate the water level of the river. It extends from the headland west of the Ammertal train bridge, the Bügeleisen (Flatiron), to the Eberhard Bridge.

== Geography ==
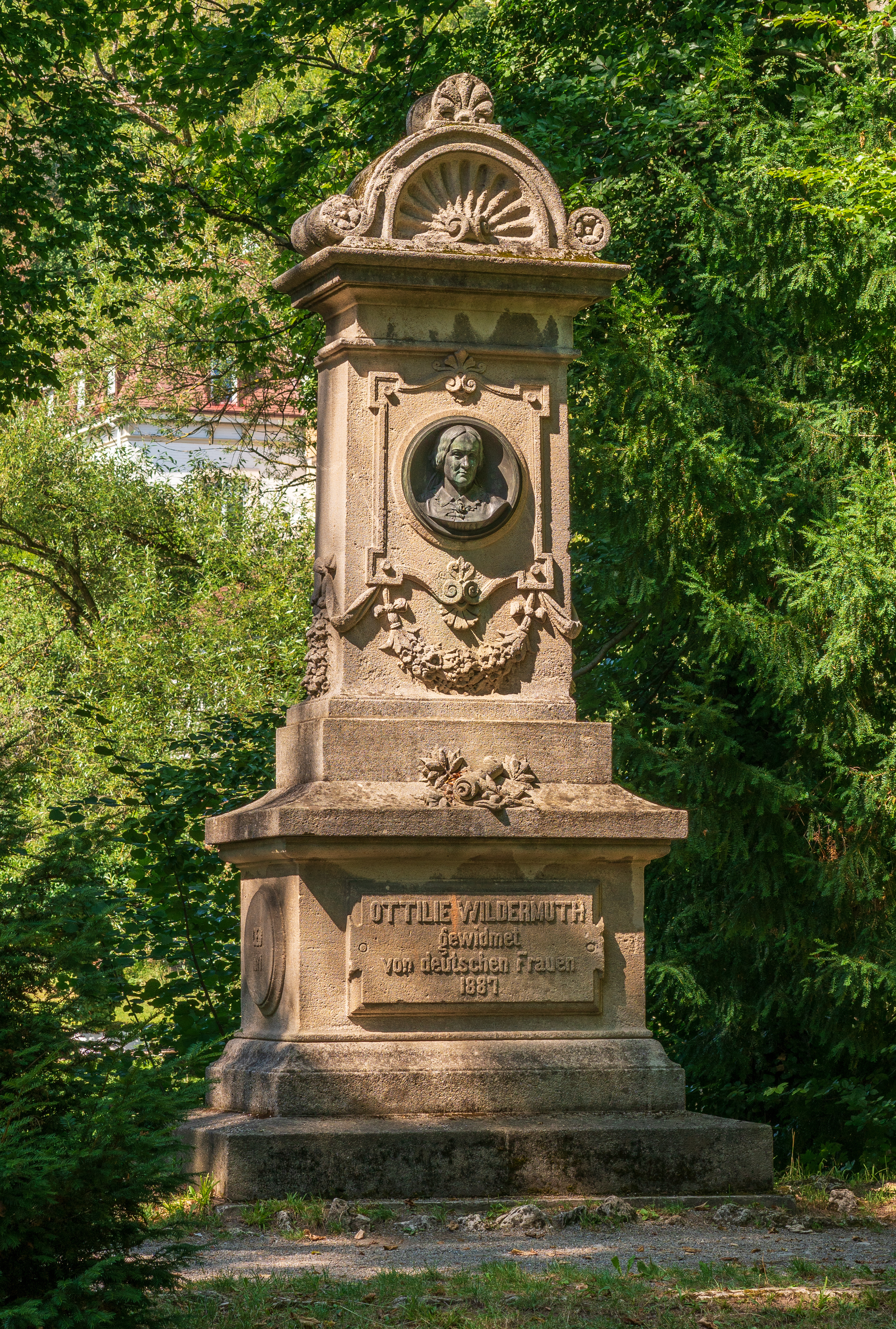
The Wildermuth Memorial

The eastern half of the island is covered by the almost 200 years old Platanenallee (Plane tree alley). In the western area lies the "Seufzerwäldchen" (sigh forest), which is traversed by some winding forest trails. West of the Alleenbrücke (Avenue Bridge) is still the Hain (grove), at the end of which, under the bridge of the Ammer Valley Railway, a small tunnel leads to the western end of the island, a railing-lined plateau at the Spitz or Bügeleisen.

Sometimes illegal campfires and barbecue parties were organized, which the public order denied due risk of fire for the plane trees of the alley.

The waterdepth of the Neckar is shallow in many places.

Two monuments are located on the island: Silcher Memorial in the middle of the island and Wildermuth Memorial in the west.

== Events ==
Every year, of early June the Tübingen Puntboat Challenge (Stocherkahnrennen) around the Neckar island is celebrated. At the annual Duck Race in late October, bright yellow squeaking ducks conquer the Neckar.

Since 2003 there has been the TüGast event Sommerinsel (Summer island), which took place for a few years on the plane tree alley and then moved for safety and conservation reasons to the Anlagensee (park lake), but kept the name.

The Neckar Island was also the scene of memorable theatrical events: The Theater Lindenhof presented outdoor performances with great response of "Hölderlin. Tübingen. Tower." 1. Tübingen Summer theatre 1986 (in cooperation with the Zimmertheater Tübingen), and "…when downward with the Neckar (Hölderlin). A walk in the evening", Summer theatre in 1993 and 1995. Since 2007, there have been several open air productions of the LTT and Zimmertheater.

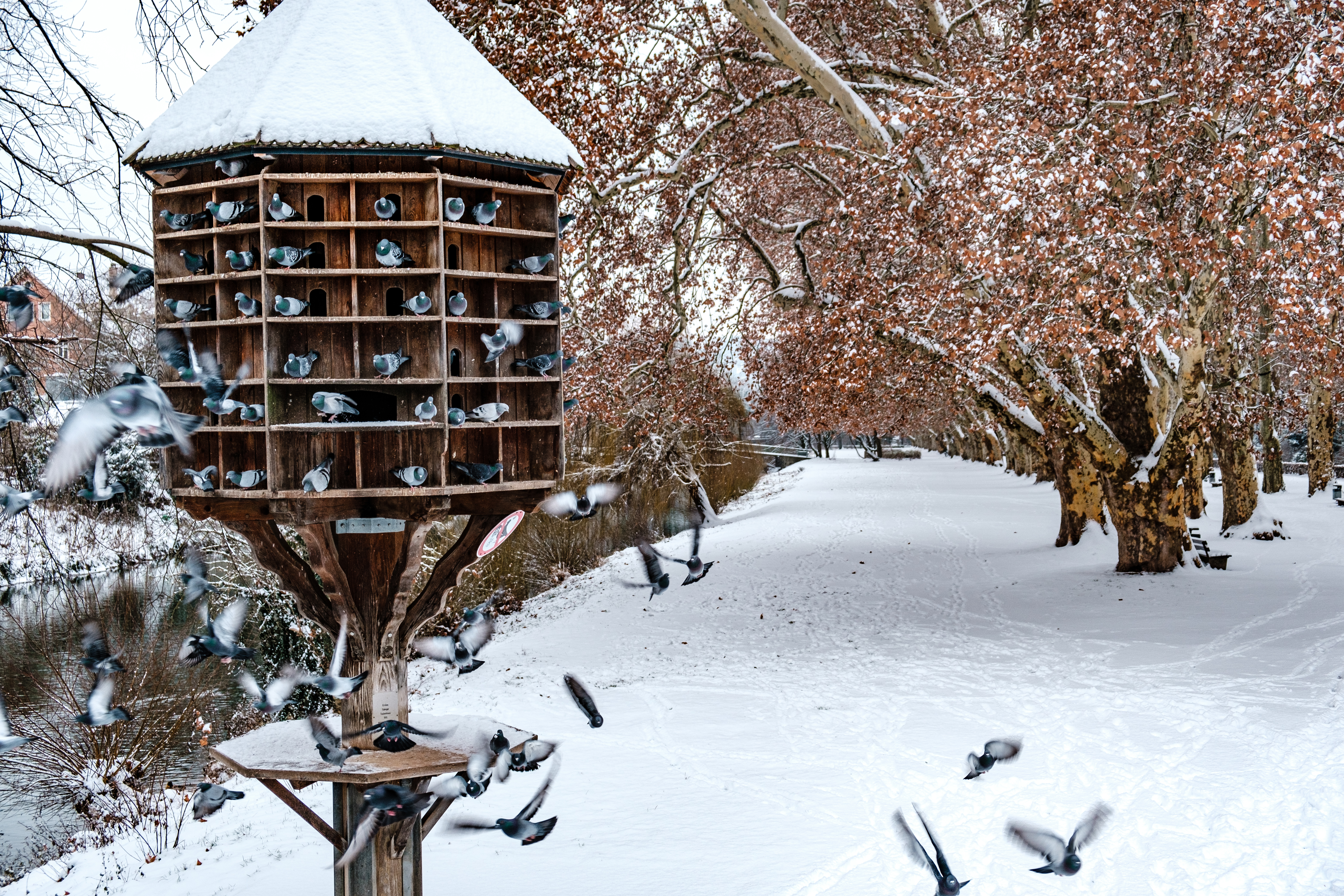
Dovecote on the Neckar island

== Access ==
From the east: from Eberhardsbrücke there is a direct stairway down to the island, at the dovecote. From the south: from Central Station and Anlagensee, it goes over a small bridge, the so-called "Indianersteg" (Indian footbridge), on the Neckar island. From the west, there is an access to the island at the Derendinger Allee and the Alleenbrücke, which can also be reached by bicycle.
