= Zimmertheater Tübingen =

Coordinates: 48°31′10″N 9°03′20″E

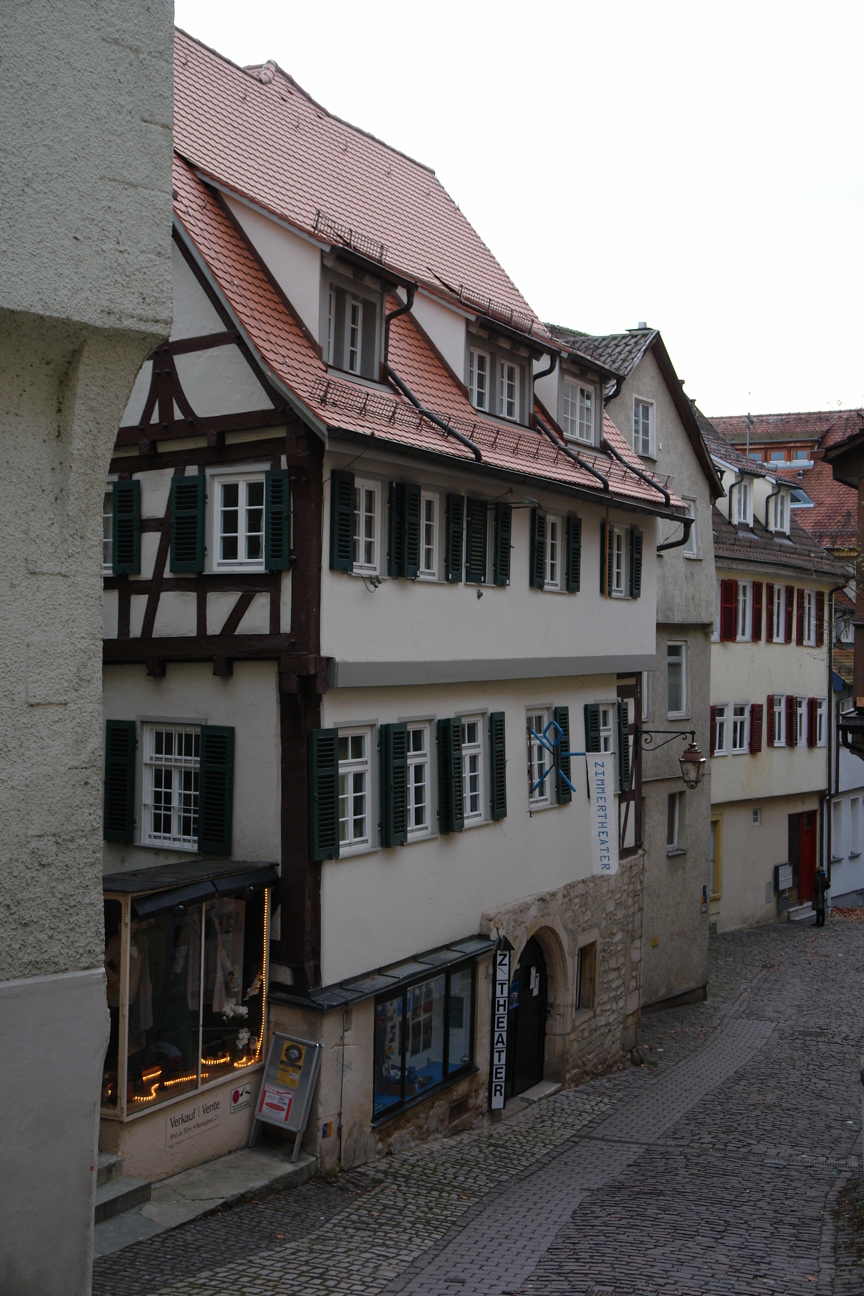
Zimmertheater Tübingen

Zimmertheater Tübingen is a very small theatre in Tübingen, Baden-Württemberg, Germany in close neighbourhood to the Hölderlinturm, where Friedrich Hölderlin spent his last years in life and near the Neckar river. It opened in 1958 and has two rooms for an audience of 60 and 80 visitors.
