= Boris Palmer =

German politician (born 1972)

- Palmer in 2025

Senior Mayor of Tübingen
- Incumbent
- Assumed office 10 January 2007
- Deputy: Cord Soehlke
- Preceded by: Brigitte Russ-Scherer

Member of the Landtag of Baden-Württemberg
- In office 12 June 2001 – 25 May 2007
- Preceded by: multi-member district
- Succeeded by: Ilka Neuenhaus
- Constituency: Alliance '90/The Greens list

Personal details
- Born: Boris Erasmus Palmer; 28 May 1972 (age 54) Waiblingen, Baden-Württemberg, West Germany
- Party: Alliance '90/The Greens (1996–2022; membership suspended since April 2022)
- Spouse: Magdalena Ruoffner (m. 2021)
- Domestic partner: Franziska Brantner (2010–2013)
- Children: 3
- Education: University of Tübingen
- Occupation: Teacher; Politician; Political Staffer

Boris Erasmus Palmer (born 28 May 1972) is a German independent politician and former member of the Green Party. He has been mayor of Tübingen since January 2007. From March 2001 to May 2007, he was a member of the Baden-Württemberg Landtag, the State parliament in Stuttgart.

Palmer's controversial and polarizing positions put forward with great self-conviction led to the withdrawal of support from his party in the 2020 municipal elections, and a process to oust him from party ranks was started the following year.

Although as mayor he has no influence on state or federal politics, he nonetheless uses his public profile to disseminate his positions through the German mass media and his own social media channels.

== Background ==
Palmer was born in Waiblingen, Baden-Württemberg. His father, Helmut, dubbed Remstalrebell ("Rems-valley rebel") was a very well known and controversial figure and perennial candidate. In a Deutsche Welle interview for the program Talking Germany with Peter Craven, Palmer described his father as a rebel who became a political activist in the 1950s, when "all the old fascists, all the old Nazis were back" in power, and said that his grandfather Siegfried Kilsheimer was a Jew who had to flee to the United States in 1938. The former state minister and CDU member Christoph Palmer is a second nephew of Helmut and a second cousin of Boris Palmer.

Palmer graduated from high school (Abitur) at the Steiner School in Winterbach-Engelberg in 1992. From 1993, Palmer studied history and mathematics at the University of Tübingen and in Sydney. In 1996, he joined the Green Party.

== Career ==
After graduating from Tübingen in 1999 Palmer worked as a scientific assistant for the Green Party in the Bundestag, the German Federal parliament, in Berlin.

=== MP of state parliament 2001–2007 ===
In March 2001 he won a seat in the Landtag of Baden-Württemberg and was appointed party spokesman for environmental and transportation issues.

In 2004 he ran for the office of mayor of Stuttgart, finishing in third place in the first round ballot at 21.5% of votes, a better result than all previous Green candidates for mayor of Stuttgart. He withdrew his candidacy before the second round ballot with an indirect recommendation that his followers should vote for the incumbent mayor Wolfgang Schuster on condition that Schuster would hold a referendum on the controversial project Stuttgart 21, which Palmer is opposed to, if costs would increase significantly. Even though that has been the case, Schuster has not kept that promise.

=== Mayor of Tübingen 2006 ===
After being re-elected to the Landtag in March 2006, Palmer decided in July to run as mayor of Tübingen and won the election on 22 October with 50.4% of the vote. He subsequently resigned from his Landtag mandate after taking office in January 2007.

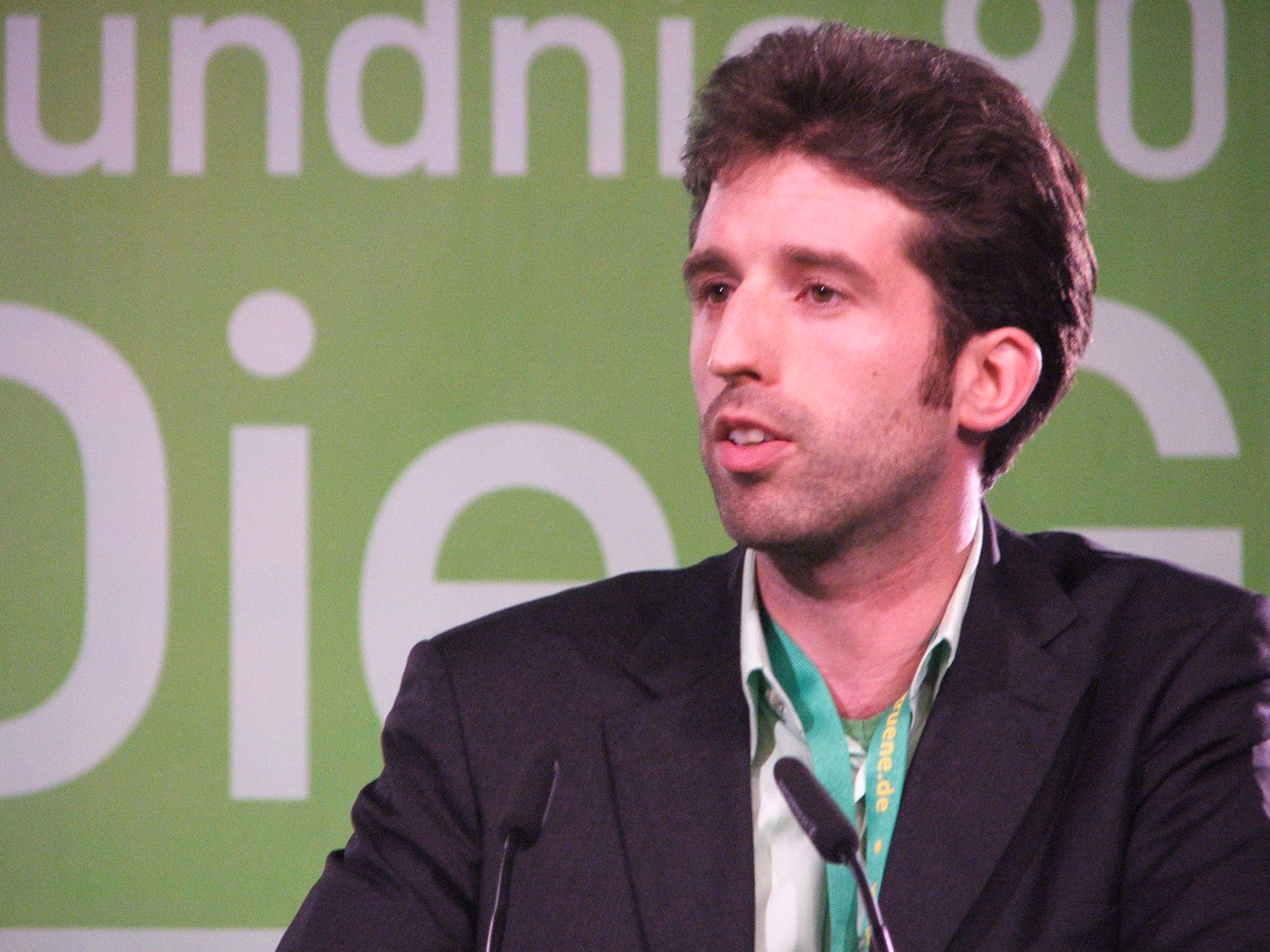
Palmer in 2006

In July 2009, Palmer was criticized for recommending antizionist activist and Tübingen resident Felicia Langer for the Federal Cross of Merit.

Palmer was a Green Party delegate to the Federal Convention for the purpose of electing the president of Germany in 2010. In March 2011, the Greens won the Baden-Württemberg state election: after decades, the CDU lost its power. Since then, Minister-President of Baden-Württemberg is a Greens politician, Winfried Kretschmann.

In November 2012, after Palmer had been critical of child adoption by homosexual couples and criticism about him being not much of a team player, the central Green party council did not reelect him.

=== Re-election 2014 ===
On 19 October 2014, Palmer was reelected for another eight-year term with a ballot of 61,7 %. Palmer's relatively conservative stance within the Greens was well known and he has been deemed as controversial in the party. His use of Facebook, e.g. with regard to a landlord that was not willing to serve drinks on inn's terrace, has caused some conflicts and doubts about his diplomatic skills.

As a result of repeated accusations of racism against Boris Palmer, the Green Party of Baden-Württemberg initiated party order proceedings against him at a digital party conference on 8 May 2021 with the aim of expelling him. On 15 November 2021, the state executive of the Green Party of Baden-Württemberg officially applied for Palmer's expulsion from the party.

=== Re-election 2022, resignation from A90/Greens and running for Free Voters party ===
After being dismissed from the Green Party, Boris Palmer ran the 2022 Tübingen Mayor Election as an independent candidate. He won the election with a clear majority by securing 52% of votes.

On 1 May 2023, Palmer announced his resignation from the Alliance 90/The Greens party via an email to the state executive committee.

Palmer run for the Free Voters party in the local elections in 2024. In December 2023, the party confirmed talks with Palmer, who wanted to become active at the local level for the Free Voters faction in the district council Kreistag.

=== Official for debureaucratization ===
Cem Özdemir (A90/Greens), a long-time friend of Palmer facilitated an initial approchement in the spring 2026 by bringing Palmer back into the fold. Taz wrote in 2026, that Özdemir strategically deployed Palmer in course of the 2026 Baden-Württemberg election campaign to appeal to conservative male voters. Following the election, Özdemir appointed Palmer as an "state advisor on debureaucratization".

In November 2026, a former municipal councilor stated that Palmer had abused his power and sexually harassed her. Palmer denied the allogations. Özdemir temporarily stripped him of his position as "state advisor on debureaucratization". The public prosecutor's office launched an investigation.

The majority of the MP of Tübingen municipal council called on him to refrain from attending any public or other official engagements until the allegations have been clarified. They also requested that Palmer address the accusations directly with them, regardless of the ongoing legal proceedings. However, the regional administrative authority (Regierungspräsidium) raised concerns, noting that Palmer, in his capacity as mayor, is obligated to chair the meeting. Consequently, Palmer continues to preside over the meetings.

== Relation to the Alliance90/The Greens ==
As mayor, Palmer repeatedly polarized opinion through provocative statements, controversial social media posts, and debates surrounding his use of racially charged language or his comparison to the Yellow badge. Within the party, he initially advocates "ultra-realo" positions, then right-wing positions.

Following controversial remarks made by Palmer including comments about former national football player Dennis Aogo, the Baden-Württemberg state branch of the Green Party initiated proceedings to expel him from the party.

Facing the threat of expulsion proceedings, both sides reached an agreement in 2022 that Palmer’s membership would, for the time being, be placed on hold.

In February 2023 Palmer attends a migration conference at the University of Frankfurt. Protesters await him outside the entrance. Palmer uses the N-word to a non-white speaker’s face; he subsequently compares the resulting outrage to the act of pinning a Yellow star of David on someone.

Leading politicians from all democratic parties, including his own distanced themselves sharply. The executive board of Goethe University Frankfurt condemned his choice of words in the strongest possible terms. Rezzo Schlauch, a long-time legal counsel and fellow party member, withdrew his political support for Palmer.

Palmer issued a public apology, announced a temporary hiatus from politics, and stated that he intended to seek "professional help".

On May 1, 2023, Palmer announced his resignation from the Alliance 90/The Greens party via an email to the state executive committee, in an effort to preempt formal proceedings for his expulsion from the party. He also declared that he would be suspending his duties as mayor.

Baden-Württemberg’s then-Minister-President Kretschmann, a member of the Green Party, stated that he respected Palmer’s decision. The federal party viewed Palmer’s move as a logical consequence.

== Politics ==
Palmer initiated a project for a light rail through the old town of Tübingen. He declared it the main part of his policy for a different traffic policy ("Verkehrswende"). The municipal council and the university also backed the project. However, in a referendum, 57.39 percent of Tübingen citizens voted against the inner-city route in summer 2021.

== Positions and critics ==
=== Immigration ===
In late 2015, Palmer was heavily criticized by other members of the Green Party, as well as by the party's youth organization, for his relatively right-wing positions on refugee immigration. In August 2017, some weeks before the German federal election, Palmer published the book "We cannot help everyone" (German: Wir können nicht allen helfen, lit. 'We cannot help everyone').

=== COVID-19 ===
On 5 May 2020, The New York Times reported that "Boris Palmer, the mayor of Tübingen, in the country's southwest, suggested that reviving the economy mattered more than the lives of potential coronavirus victims, whom he characterized as old and unwell. 'Let me be blunt: In Germany, we might be saving people who would be dead in half a year anyway,' he said in a TV interview last Tuesday."

=== Opinion poll ===
Palmer's candidacy in 2022 is based, among other things, on a survey in Tübingen, according to which the citizens want him back as mayor. The survey was carried out among 500 people from Tübingen in October 2021, shortly after the federal elections. Various topics were queried in it, the question about Palmer was only one.

In February 2022, Palmer admitted to DLF that he had commissioned and paid for the survey at the time.

== Private life ==
Until 2013, Palmer was in a relationship with Franziska Brantner, a than MP of Bundestag and the European Parliament and later head of A90/Greens. Following the birth of their daughter (born 2010), he became one of the first mayors in Germany to take two months of parental leave during which time he suspended his official duties.

Later Palmer got in a relation to the teacher Magdalena Ruoffner. The coupel has two children born in 2015 and 2020. The couple married in December 2021. Cem Özdemir was Palmers officiate at his wedding.

On a Friday evening in 2019, a student out with a female friend encountered Palmer on the street and remarked in his direction, "oh no, not him too..". Palmer responded by initiating an argument, following and photographing the pair, demanding the student’s personal details, and filing a complaint against him for "disturbing the peace." Palmer also defamed the student on Facebook. In the subsequent court proceedings, Palmer did not prevail.

In the autumn of 2026, a former city council member representing the party "Die Partei" accused Palmer of sexual misconduct. She stated that she had been involved in a "secret, sexually charged relationship" with him. Palmer responded by asserting that the allegations were groundless. As accusations of misconduct had been raised, the public prosecutor's office launched an investigation (as of November 2026).

== Other activities ==
- Max Planck Institute for Biological Cybernetics, Member of the Board of Trustees
- Max Planck Institute for Intelligent Systems, Member of the Board of Trustees
- Max Planck Institute for Biology, Member of the Board of Trustees
