= St. George's Collegiate Church, Tübingen =

Roman Catholic Church in Germany

St George's Collegiate Church
- Stiftskirche
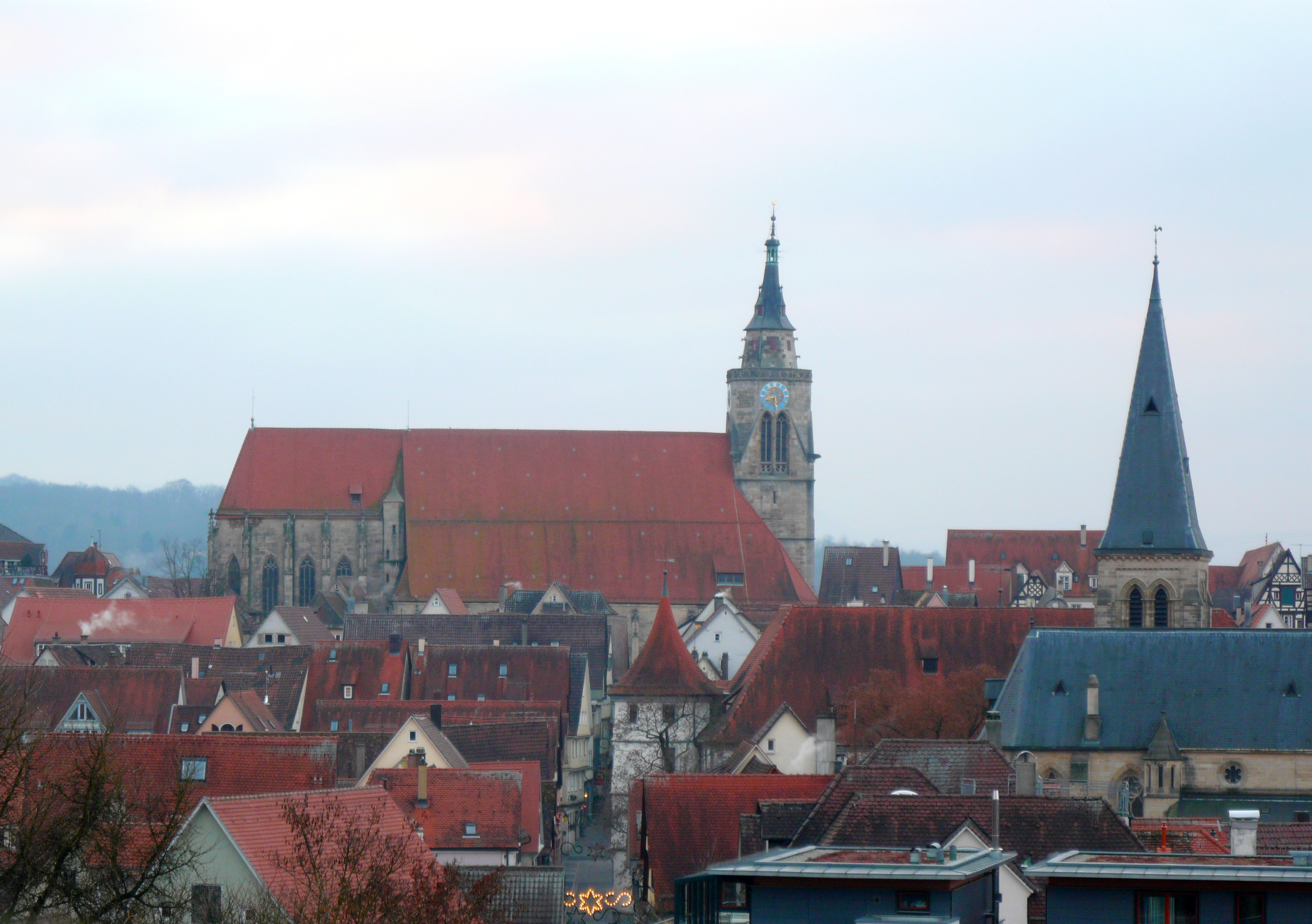
- Stiftskirche from the north
- St George's Collegiate Church
- 48°31′12″N 9°3′22″E
- Denomination: Lutheran
- Previous denomination: Roman Catholic

Architecture
- Style: Gothic

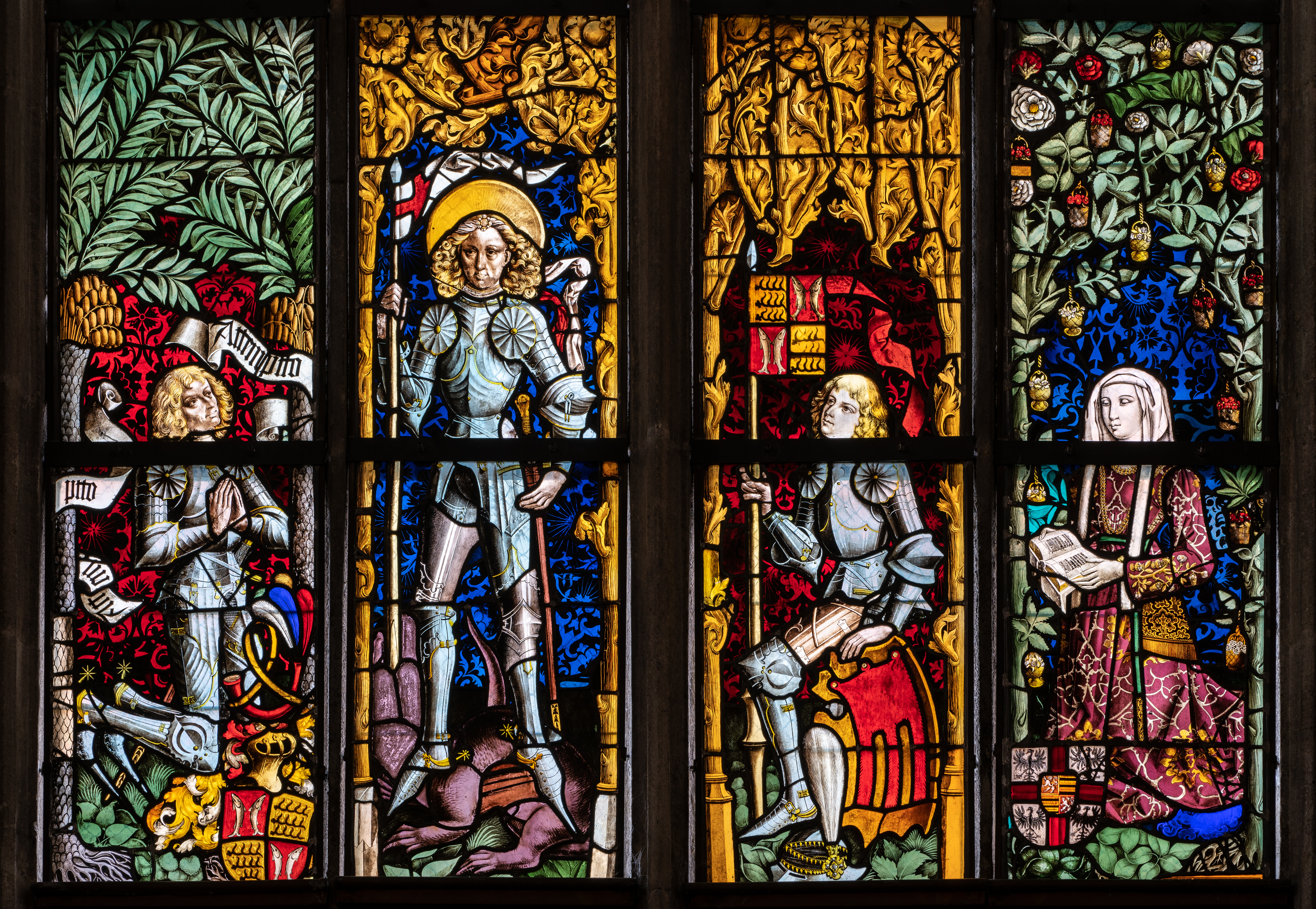
The lower part of the central window in the apse, showing the church patron and the founder, created about 1478 by Peter Hemmel of Andlau

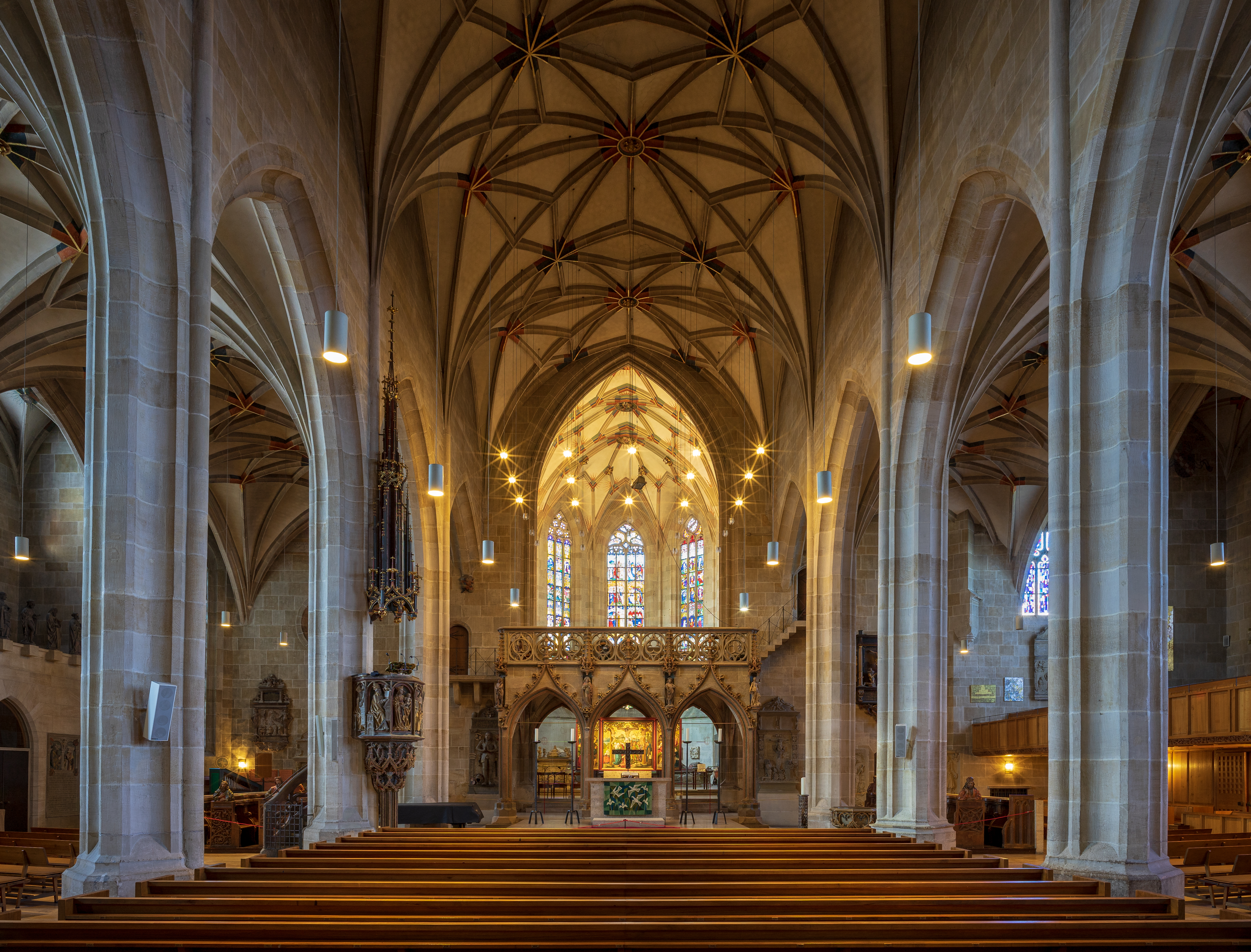
Interior of the Stiftskirche

The Stiftskirche is a church located in Tübingen, Baden-Württemberg, Germany. It is a late Gothic structure built by Peter von Koblenz in 1470. The stained glass windows were designed by Peter Hemmel of Andlau who also designed windows in Ulm, Augsburg, Nuremberg, Munich and Strasbourg. It is the central landmark of Tübingen and, along with the rest of the city, the Stiftskirche was one of the first to convert to Martin Luther's Protestant church. It maintains (and carefully defends) several "Roman Catholic" features, such as patron saints.

Tower music is played from the church tower every Sunday.

== Burials in the Stiftskirche ==
- Eberhard I, Duke of Württemberg
- Ulrich, Duke of Württemberg
- Duchess Sabina of Bavaria
- Christoph, Duke of Württemberg
- Duchess Anna Maria of Brandenburg-Ansbach
- Ludwig III, Duke of Württemberg
- Duchess Dorothea Ursula of Baden-Durlach
- Duchess Ursula zu Veldenz-Lauterecken
