= Hölderlinturm =

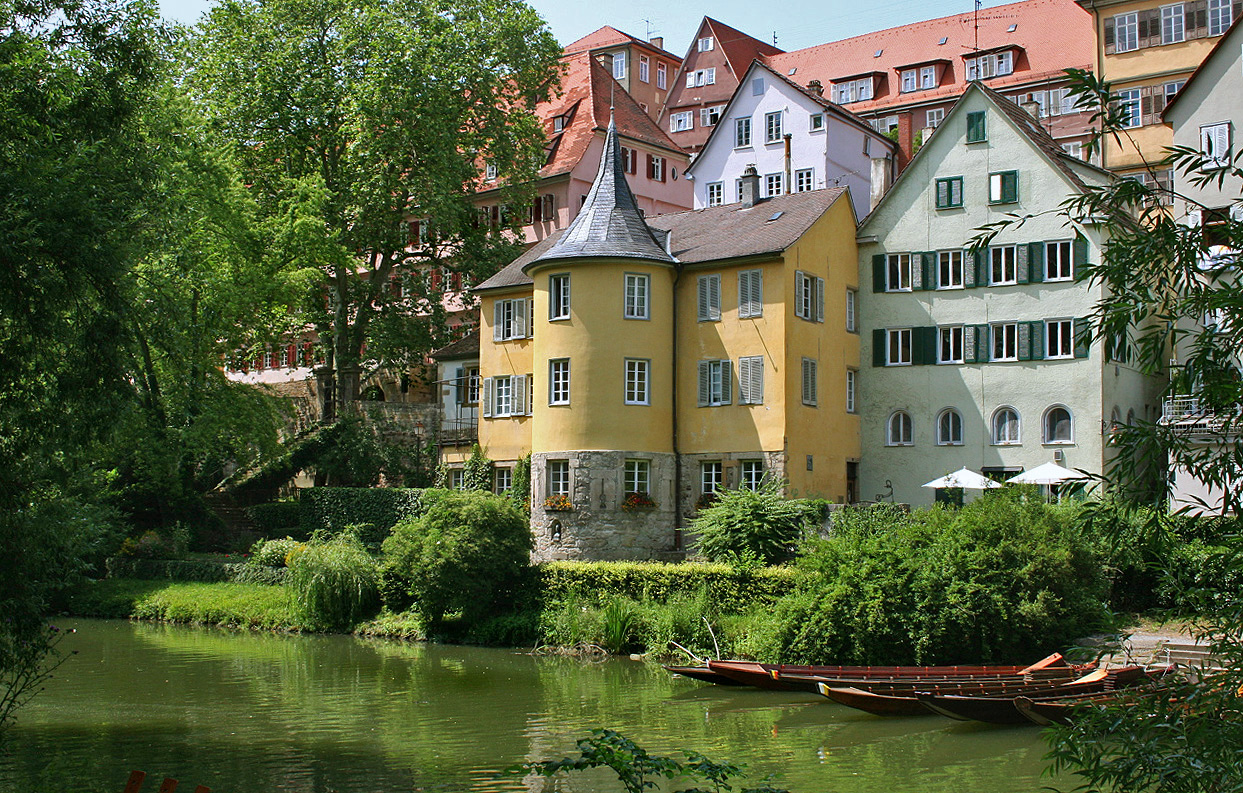
- Hölderlinturm with punts

- Location within Baden-Württemberg
- Etymology: Friedrich Hölderlin

General information
- Type: Tower
- Location: Tübingen, Germany
- Coordinates: 48.51935°N 9.05568°E
- Current tenants: Hölderlin-Gesellschaft
- Completed: 13th century

Design and construction
- Known for: Place of residence and death in the final years of poet Friedrich Hölderlin

The Hölderlinturm (English: Hölderlin's Tower) is a building located in Tübingen, Germany that served as the place of residence and death in the final years of poet Friedrich Hölderlin. He lived there from May 3, 1807 until his death in 1843. The building is located on the Neckar riverfront and is one of the most popularly known sites in Tübingen.

== History ==
The construction of the building traces back to the 13th century. The stone foundation originates from the medieval city wall that originally ran along the northern bank of the Neckar. Hölderlin was forcibly admitted by his family to the clinic of physician Johann Autenrieth on September 15, 1806. The 34-year-old master carpenter Ernst Friedrich Zimmer acquired the property in 1807. Hölderlin was released on May 3, 1807, around the same time as Zimmer's purchase, with a prognosis of incurable illness and three years to live ("höchstens noch drei Jahre").

Autenrieth, meanwhile, had encouraged Zimmer to take Hölderlin into his home, and, looking back on the situation, Zimmer wrote:

Ich besuchte Hölderlin im Klinikum und bedauerte ihn sehr, daß ein so schöner herrlicher Geist zu Grunde gehen soll. Da im Klinikum nichts weiter mit Hölderlin zu machen war, so machte der Kanzler Autenrit mir den Vorschlag Hölderlin in mein Haus aufzunehmen, er wüßte kein passenderes Lokal.

"I visited Hölderlin in the clinic and felt very sorry for him, that such a beautiful, splendid spirit should perish. Because there was nothing more to be done with Hölderlin in the clinic, Autenrit suggested to me to admit Hölderlin into my home, since he could not think of a more appropriate place."

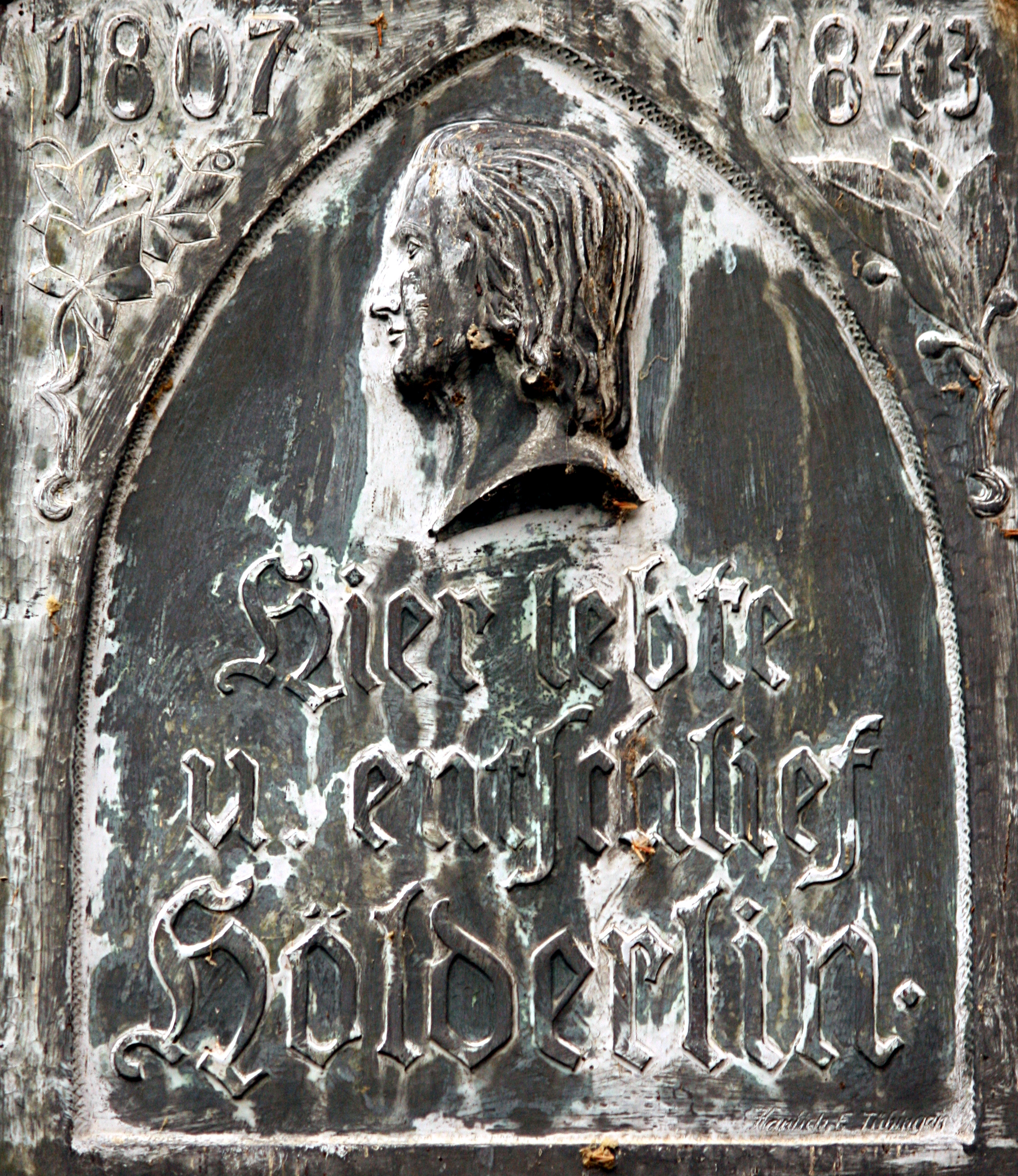
An inscription in the tower that reads: "1807–1843 / Here lived and rested Hölderlin"

Hölderlin moved into the first floor of Zimmer's residence the day after his release and lived there until his death in 1843. During Hölderlin's tower period, he often wrote under the pseudonym Scardanelli. He also received visitors from the neighboring Tübinger Stift, the school Hölderlin himself had once attended. A visit to the ailing Hölderlin by Eduard Mörike and Wilhelm Waiblinger, both known for their relationship to Hölderlin, is documented by Hermann Hesse in his 1914 short story "Im Presselschen Gartenhaus" ("In Pressel's Garden-House").

The building has since been extensively renovated and is now the seat of the Hölderlin Society (Hölderlin-Gesellschaft).

== Exhibition ==
The museum’s permanent exhibition focuses on the periods of Friedrich Hölderlin’s life spent in Tübingen, including his years of study at the Protestant Seminary (Evangelisches Stift) from 1788 to 1793 and the final 36 years of his life in the tower residence of the carpenter Ernst Zimmer. The exhibition also addresses Hölderlin’s friendship with the philosophers Georg Wilhelm Friedrich Hegel and Friedrich Wilhelm Joseph Schelling, who were his fellow theology students, as well as his early publications from this period. It presents materials related to his so-called “Tower poems”, written during his later years in the tower, and examines his experimentation with language and rhythm.

== See also ==
- Neckarfront
