= Johann Ludwig Brassicanus =

Johann Ludwig Brassicanus (1509 – 3 June 1549) was an advisor to the Habsburg monarchy.

== Biography ==
Brassicanus was born in Tübingen and was the younger brother of Johann Alexander Brassicanus. He joined his brother in Vienna in 1524. He won distinction both as a philologist and jurist. He spent some time working for Sigmund von Herberstein and Nicholas Oláh, and obtained the title of court historiographer of the Roman King, after which he studied law at Heidelberg University.

He was professor of Greek at both Vienna University and Padua University. In 1536 he was made Doctor Juris at Padua, he was appointed professor in Vienna in 1537, later becoming professor of canon law. He joined the council of the Holy Roman Emperor, Ferdinand I, getting a coat of arms. He served the university at Vienna, being rector twice and dean four times. In 1544 he was made provincial superintendent.

He published very little, leaving only a few addresses and treatises on legal subjects.
