= Tübingen =

City in Baden-Württemberg, Germany

Tübingen Dibenga (Swabian)
- Town
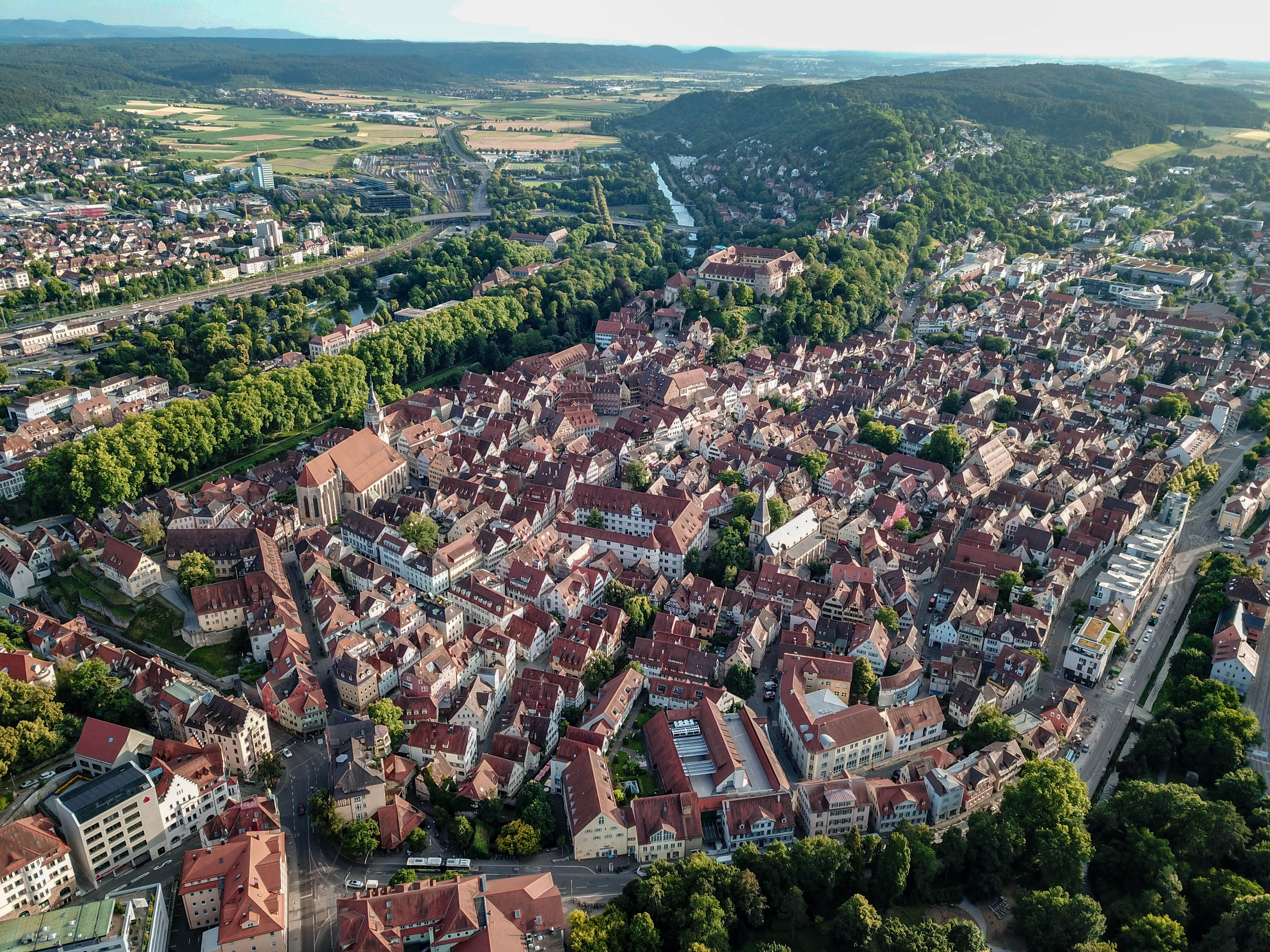
- Tübingen seen from above in June 2018

- Coat of arms

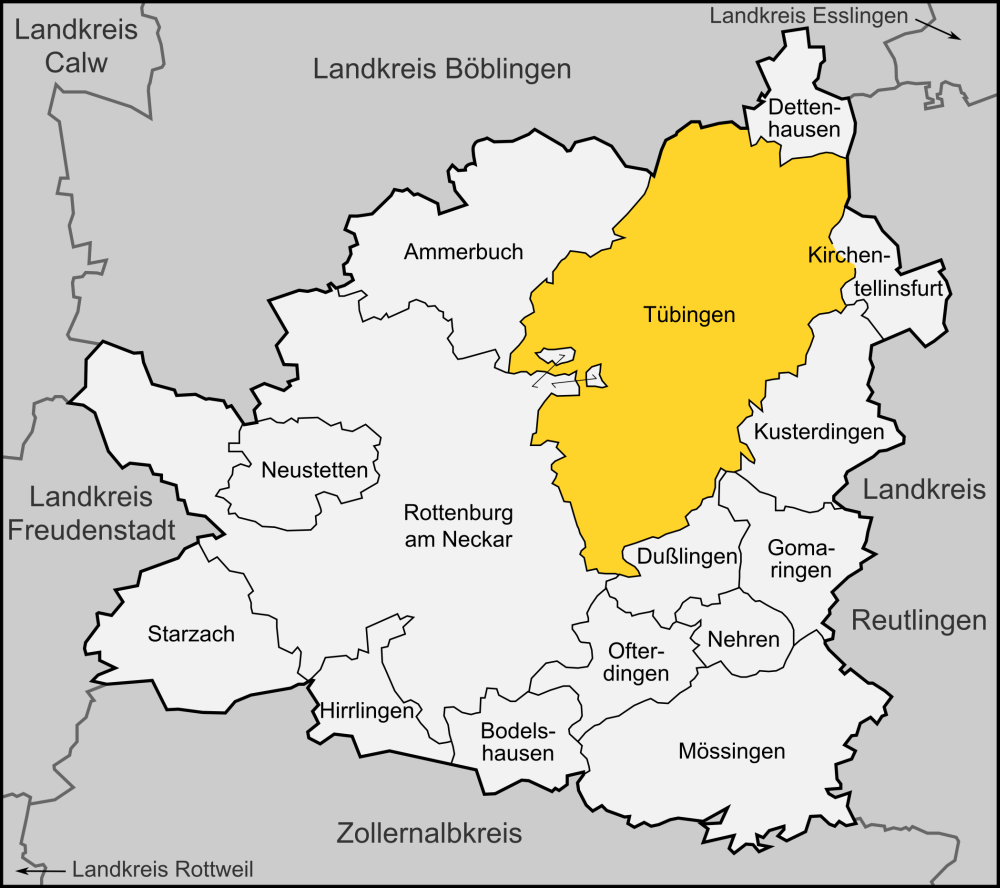
- Location of Tübingen within Tübingen district
- Interactive map of Tübingen
- Location within Germany Location within Baden-Württemberg
- Coordinates: 48°31′12″N 09°03′20″E
- Country: Germany
- State: Baden-Württemberg
- Admin. region: Tübingen
- District: Tübingen

Government
  - Mayor (2022–30): Boris Palmer (Ind.)

Area
  - Total: 108.12 km^{2} (41.75 sq mi)
- Elevation: 341 m (1,119 ft)

Population (2025-12-31)
  - Total: 92,607
  - Density: 856.52/km^{2} (2,218.4/sq mi)
- Time zone: UTC+01:00 (CET)
  - Summer (DST): UTC+02:00 (CEST)
- Postal codes: 72001–72099
- Dialling codes: 07071; 07073 (Unterjesingen); 07472 (Bühl)
- Vehicle registration: TÜ
- Website: www.tuebingen.de

Tübingen (/ˈtubɪŋən/; German: [ˈtyːbɪŋən]; Swabian: Deebenga) is a traditional university city in central Baden-Württemberg, Germany, 30 km (19 mi) south of the state capital, Stuttgart. With students accounting for almost one in three of Tübingen's 90,000 residents, the city has one of the youngest profiles in Germany, with an average age of just under 40.

Founded in 1477, Eberhard Karl University is one of the oldest universities north of the Alps. The university associated Tübingen in the 19th century with the German-patriotic student Burschenschaften, whose large fraternity houses are still a notable feature of the town; in the years between the World Wars, with the rise of National Socialism; and in the German Federal Republic with the emergence of the liberal-left Greens, currently the largest tendency in local government.

Exceptionally, Tübingen survived the Second World War with its historic fabric almost wholly intact. It has since experienced two major expansions: in the 1960s, the construction of university institutes and new housing on the high ground to the north, and, following the end of the Cold War and the evacuation of extensive military bases by the French, the new mixed-use Loretto and French Quarter to the south.

== Location ==
Tübingen developed around the base of the fortress Schloss Hohentübingen and of the St. George's Collegiate Church, and on both sides of the Neckar and Ammer rivers.

Immediately north of the city lies the Schönbuch, a densely wooded nature park. The Swabian Alb mountains rise about 13 km (8 mi) (beeline Tübingen City to Roßberg - 869 m) to the southeast of Tübingen. The Ammer and Steinlach rivers are tributaries of the Neckar river, which flows in an easterly direction through the city, just south of the mediaeval old town. Large parts of the city are hilly, with the Schlossberg and the Österberg in the city centre and the Schnarrenberg and Herrliberg, among others, rising immediately adjacent to the inner city.

The highest point is at about 500 m (1,600 ft) above sea level near Bebenhausen in the Schönbuch forest, while the lowest point is 305 m (1,001 ft) in the city's eastern Neckar valley. The geographical centre of the state of Baden-Württemberg is in a small forest called Elysium, near the Botanical Gardens of the city's university.

== History ==
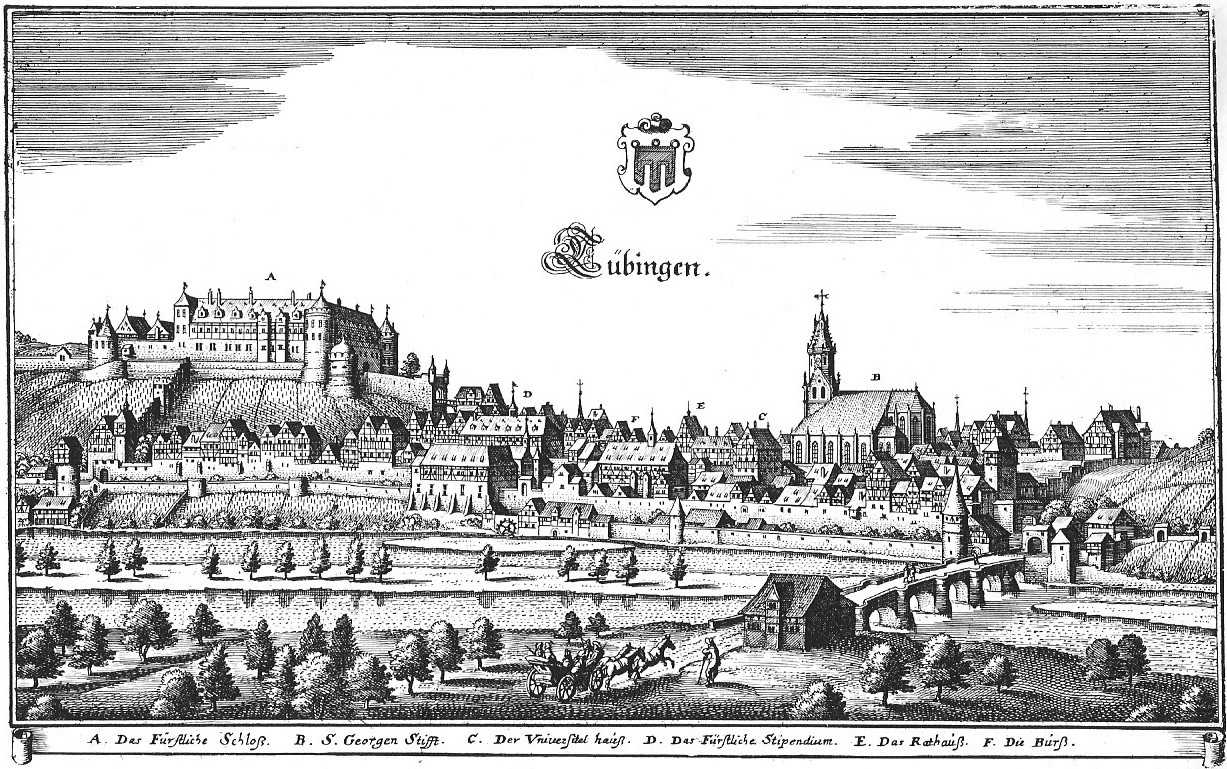
View of Tübingen (c. 1643) from the south bank of the Neckar

The area was probably first settled in the 12th millennium BC. The Romans left some traces here in AD 85, when, in confrontation with the local Alamanni, they built a limes frontier wall at the Neckar River. The local castle, Hohentübingen, has records going back to 1078, when it was besieged by Henry IV, King of Germany.

In the middle of the 12th century, the local the Counts of Zollern were raised to Imperial Counts Palatine, with their seat in Tübingen. By 1231, Tübingen was a civitas, indicating recognition by the Crown of civil liberties, a market and a court system. In the later decades of the 13th century, the town saw the establishment an Augustinian, and a Franciscan, monastery, and a Latin school (today's Uhland-Gymnasium). In 1342, the town and castle passed to the Counts of Württemberg.

Coinciding with his expulsion of the town's Jewish community, in 1477 Count (later Duke) Eberhard V (Eberhard im Bart) founded the university. The university, for which St George's, built between 1430 and 1470, became the collegiate church (Stiftskirche), developed as one of the most influential places of learning in the Holy Roman Empire, particularly in theology. Today, the Eberhard Karl University is the largest source of income for the residents of the city and one of the biggest universities in Germany with more than 26,000 students.

Faced with a popular rebellion, in the Treaty of Tübingen 1514, Eberhard's successor, Duke Ulrich, was obliged to submit to co-governance with the assembled Estates (knights, clergy and burghers) and to concede freedom of movement, profession, and enterprise, achievements that were still being fought for in other German states in 1848. In recognition of the treaty, the town assumed the right to bear the Ducal stag antlers above its blazon on its coat of arms.

In 1535, after recovering his bankrupted duchy from a prolonged imperial-Hapsburg occupation, Duke Ulrich declared for the reformed Lutheran faith and seized church property (the Augustinian monastery was converted to a Protestant seminary, the Tübinger Stift). The religious division in Germany contributed to the Thirty Years' War (1618-1648) during which the town was successively occupied by the Catholic League, by the Swedes in 1638, and by the French, and was devastated by plague.

In 1789, parts of the old town are burned down, but were later rebuilt in the original style. In 1798 the Allgemeine Zeitung, a leading newspaper in early 19th-century Germany, was founded in Tübingen by Johann Friedrich Cotta. At his residence, the Cottahaus, a sign commemorates Goethe's stay of a few weeks while visiting his publisher: "Hier kotzte Goethe" (lit.: "Goethe puked here").

From the beginning of the 19th century, the town grew significantly beyond its medieval borders for the first time with the rectangular Wilhelmsvorstadt at the Neue Aula and the old Botanical Garden.

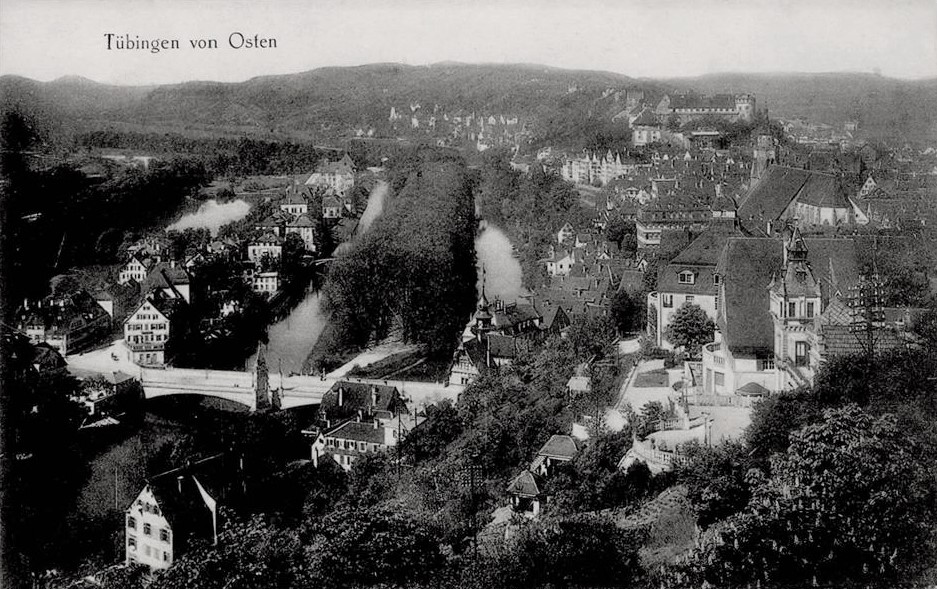
Tübingen from Österberg, Neckarinsel in the centre and the houses of the student fraternities (Studentenverbindungen and Burschenschaften) in the right foreground

In the so-called Gôgenaufstand (Gôgen Uprising) of 1831, journeymen and winegrowers marched through the town in protest against police brutality, singing a hymn to freedom from Friedrich Schiller's drama Die Räuber (The Robbers). The local authorities appealed for help to the officially banned Burschenschaften, and armed student security guards were deployed against the insurgents. They relied on students once more during the Tübinger Brotkrawall (Tübingen Bread Riot) of 1847.

In 1861, with the opening on the right bank of the Neckar of today's main train station, Tübingen was connected to the Royal Württemberg State Railways network.

In 1873, the 10th Württemberg Infantry Regiment was quartered in barracks erected behind the station, the later Thiepval Kaserne so named for the village where the regiment suffered heavy losses during the First World War Battle of the Somme in 1916. A second barracks, later named the Loretto Kaserne, was built in 1913, and a third, the Hindenburg Kaserne was constructed in the course of National Socialist rearmament in the 1930s.

Tübingen had been a regional stronghold of National Socialism before Hitler's ascent to power in January 1933. The university became a leading centre for research on the "Jewish question", with faculty in both the sciences and humanities contributing to the notions of "racial hygiene" that informed the genocidal policies of the new regime. On Kristallnacht, 9 November 1938, the Nazi Stormtroopers burned down the Tübingen Synagogue. Of the 23 members of synagogue who remained in Tübingen at the outbreak of war, only two survived the Shoah.

In 1934, in a rare instance of resistance to the new order, Corps Suevia, one of the university's typically nationalist and conservative student Burschenschaften, refused an order to exclude Jewish students and was dissolved.

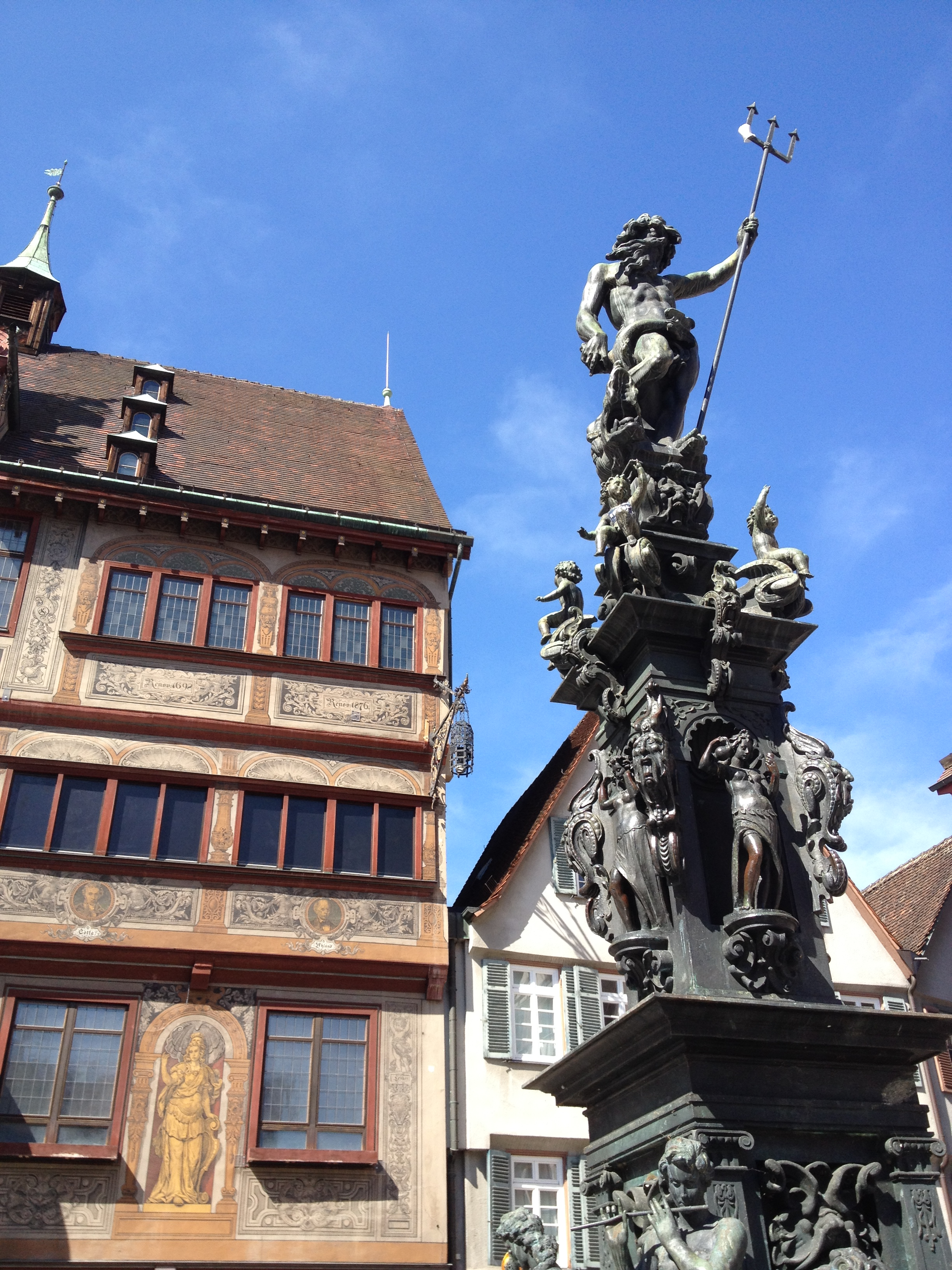
Neptune Fountain in the Market Place, restored and recast after World War II from melted-down armaments

There were three bombing raids on the town during Second World War, but damage was comparatively slight: the Neckar Bridge and some 85 houses. In April 1945, the town was surrendered to the French who were to remain as occupiers until the creation of the German Federal Republic in 1949, and as an allied garrison until the end of the Cold War in 1991.

Consistent with the role of the Marshall Plan in post-war reconstruction, the United States also had a presence in the town. Originally the Amerika Haus, the German-American Institute ("d.a.i."), at the Neckar Bridge continues to promote English-language classes and "cultural exchange".

In 1946, under the French, Tübingen served as the capital of the consolidated state of Württemberg-Hohenzollern, but in 1952, in a further amalgamation, it was absorbed in the federal state of Baden-Württemberg with its capital in Stuttgart.

In the second half of the 20th century, Tübingen's administrative area was extended beyond what is now called the "core city" to include several outlying small towns and villages. Most notable among these is Bebenhausen, a village clustered around a castle and Bebenhausen Abbey, a Cistercian cloister about 2 miles (3.2 km) north of Tübingen. The enlargement accommodated a 1958 general development plan for hills overlooking the town from the north, which included, a new botanical gardens, natural sciences institute and contemporary art museum (Kunsthalle Tubingen).

Following the departure of the French in 1992, the vacated Thiepval Barracks served as a hostel for asylum seekers and German immigrants from Eastern Europe, and the Loretto and Hindenburg barracks were redeveloped as the new mixed-use French Quarter (Französische Viertel). Success in developing the new district has been followed up, more recently, by a car-free, courtyard-cluster project in the Derendingen district, and an extensive renovation of the Waldhäuser Ost district featuring timber-hybrid construction methods.

In the 1960s, Tübingen was one of the centres of the German student movement and of the protests of 1968, which made an issue of perceived continuities between the Federal Republic and the Hitler regime. In a town in which neither of the major federal parties, the SPD and the CDU, could command majorities, in 1980 the generation of '68 helped promote a new electoral force. Since 2004, the Greens have been the largest party in the local council (Gemeinderat). In the 2024 local elections (in which there was no mandate for the AfD or other far-right groupings), they commanded over a third of the vote.

== Overview ==
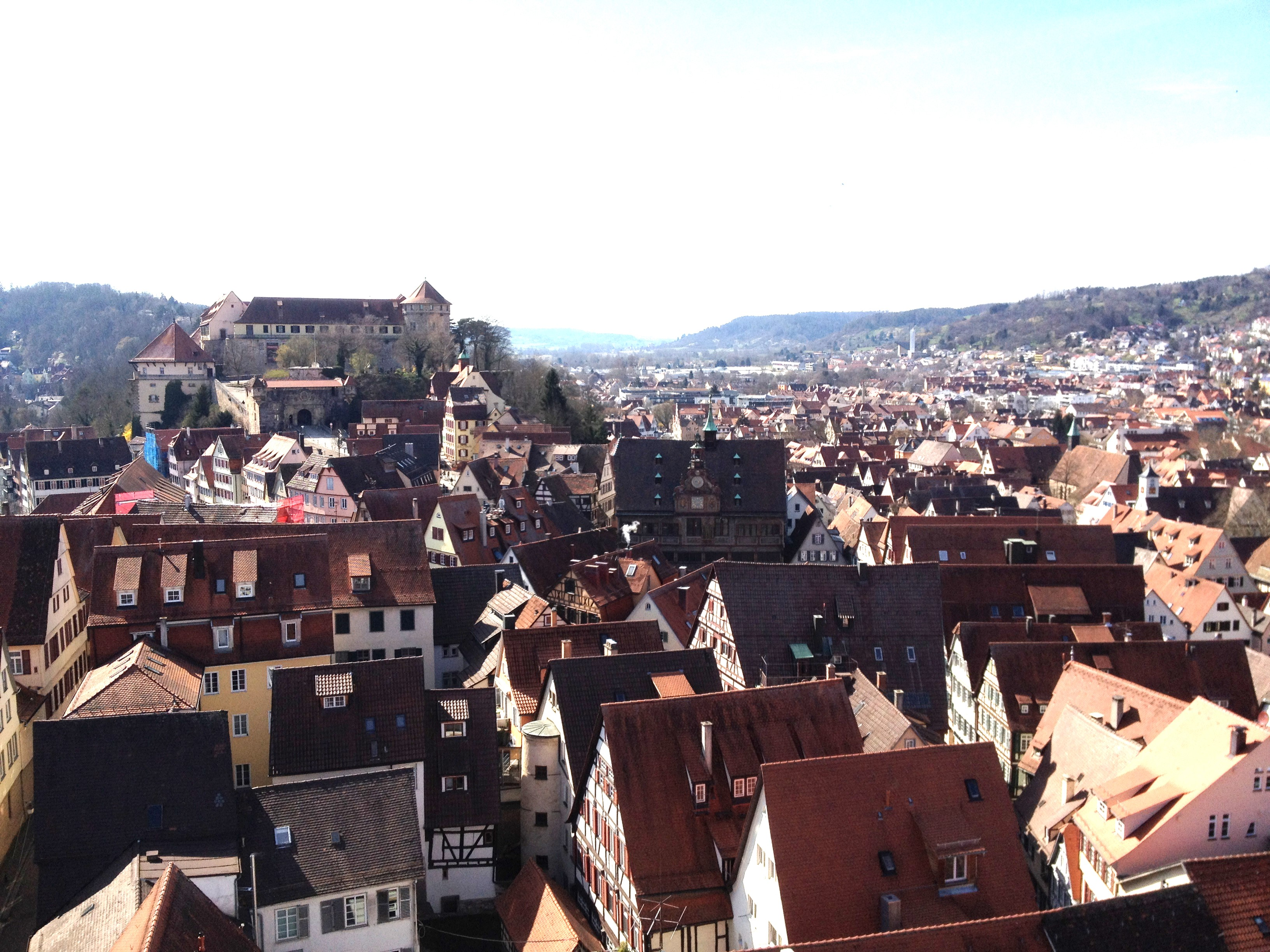
Castle Hohentübingen from the tower of the St. George's Collegiate Church

In 2020, the city had 90,000 inhabitants. Life in the city is dominated by its roughly 28,000 students rendering it the city with the youngest average population in Germany. In 1995, the German weekly magazine Focus published a national survey, according to which Tübingen had the highest quality of life of all cities in Germany. Factors taken into consideration included the infrastructure, the integration of bicycle lanes into the road system, a bus system connecting surrounding hills and valleys, late-night services, areas of the city that can be reached on foot, the pedestrianised old town, and other amenities and cultural events offered by the university.

== Main sights ==
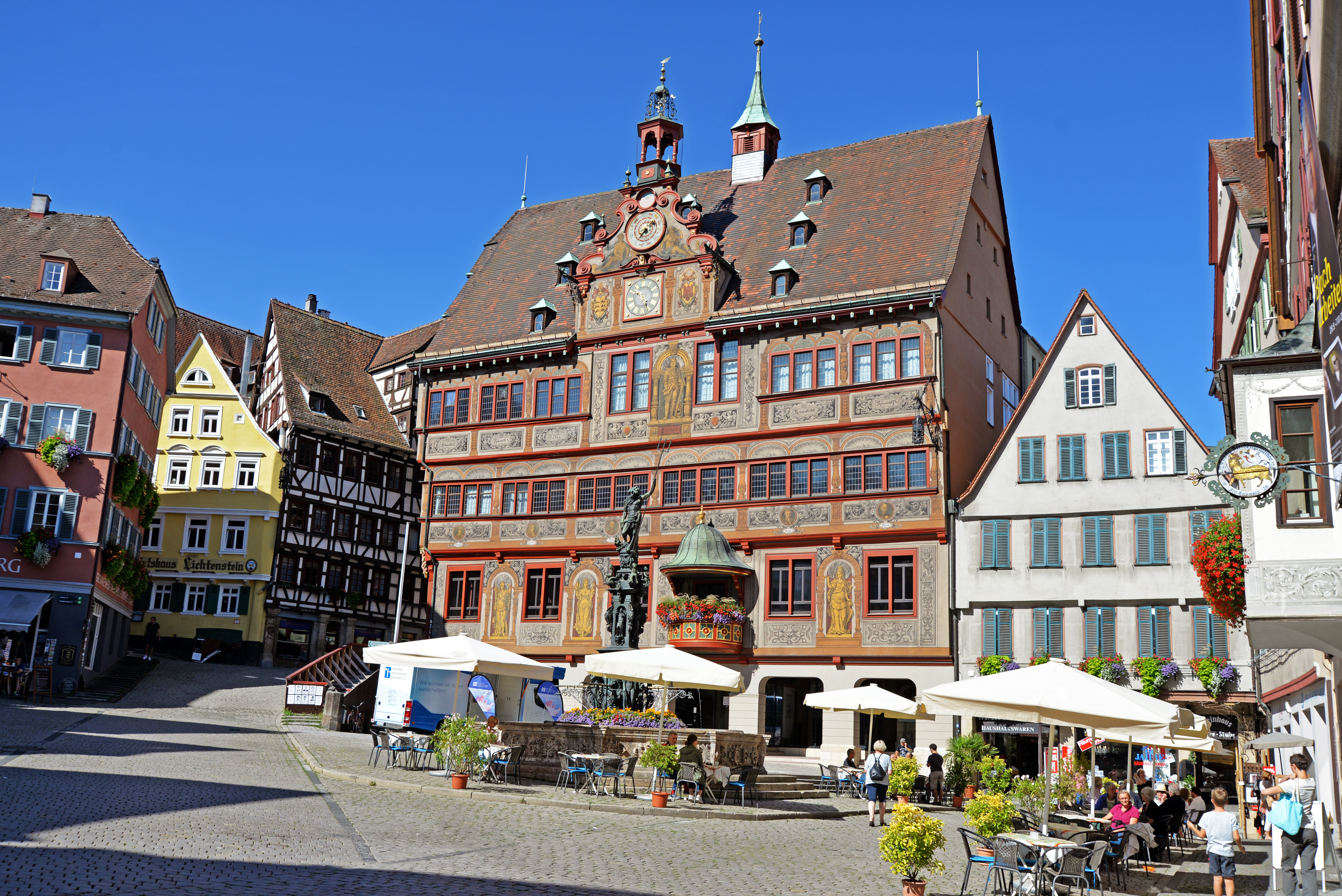
Tübingen Rathaus (Council Chambers)

Unlike its industrial neighbour, Reutlingen, in World War II Tübingen was not a persistent target for Allied bombers. Visitors come to wander through one of the few completely intact historic Altstädte in Germany. The highlights of Tübingen include its crooked cobblestone lanes, narrow-stair alleyways picking their way through the hilly terrain, streets lined with canals, and well-maintained traditional half-timbered houses.

Old town landmarks include the Rathaus (Council Chambers or Town Hall) on the central market, Castle Hohentübingen, now part of the University, and the St. George's Collegiate Church from whose oldest feature, the clock tower begun in 1411, visitors have a panoramic views. Below the Rathaus is a quiet, residential street called the Judengasse, which was at the heart of the Jewish community in Tübingen until its expulsion in 1477.

The centre of Tübingen is the site of weekly and seasonal events, including regular market days on the Holzmarkt by the St. George's Collegiate Church and the Marktplatz by the Rathaus, an outdoor cinema in winter and summer, festive autumn and Christmas markets and what was for a time Europe's largest Afro-Brazilian festival. Additionally, Tübingen hosts a yearly Chocolate festival in December.

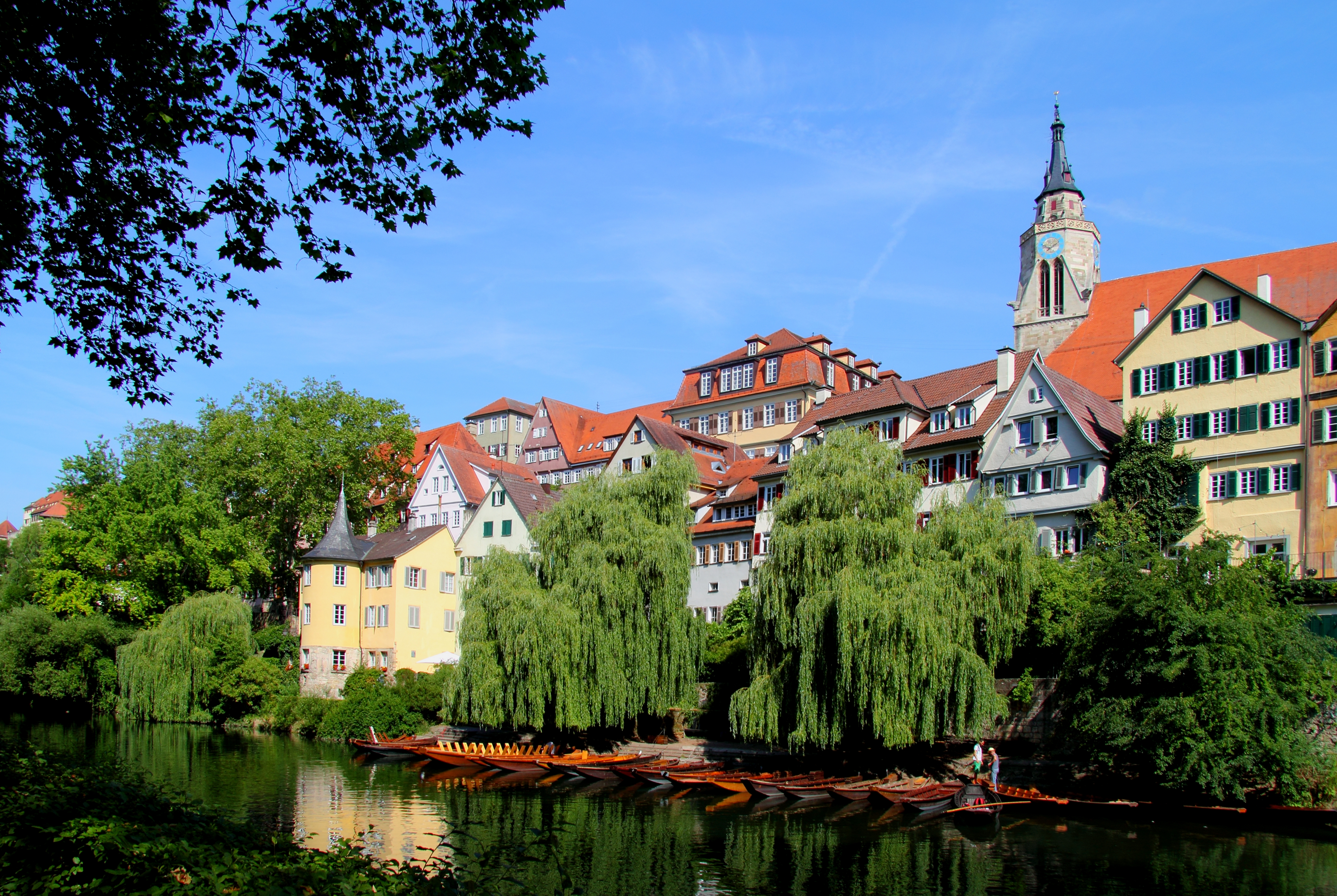
Tübingen, Neckarfront with the St. George's Collegiate Church (top right) and Hölderlinturm (bottom left)

As it reaches the town's historic centre, the Neckar divides briefly into two streams, forming the elongated Neckarinsel (Neckar Island), famous for its Platanenallee, an avenue of plane trees accessed at its eastern end by a staircase down from the Neckarbrücke, the bridge leading into the old town.

During the summer, the Neckarinsel is occasionally the venue for concerts, plays, and literary readings. The island provides a view of the town's Neckarfront, a collection of historical buildings that includes the Hölderlinturm, the tower house in which poet and philosopher Friedrich Hölderlin spent the last 36 years of his life, as he struggled with mental instability.

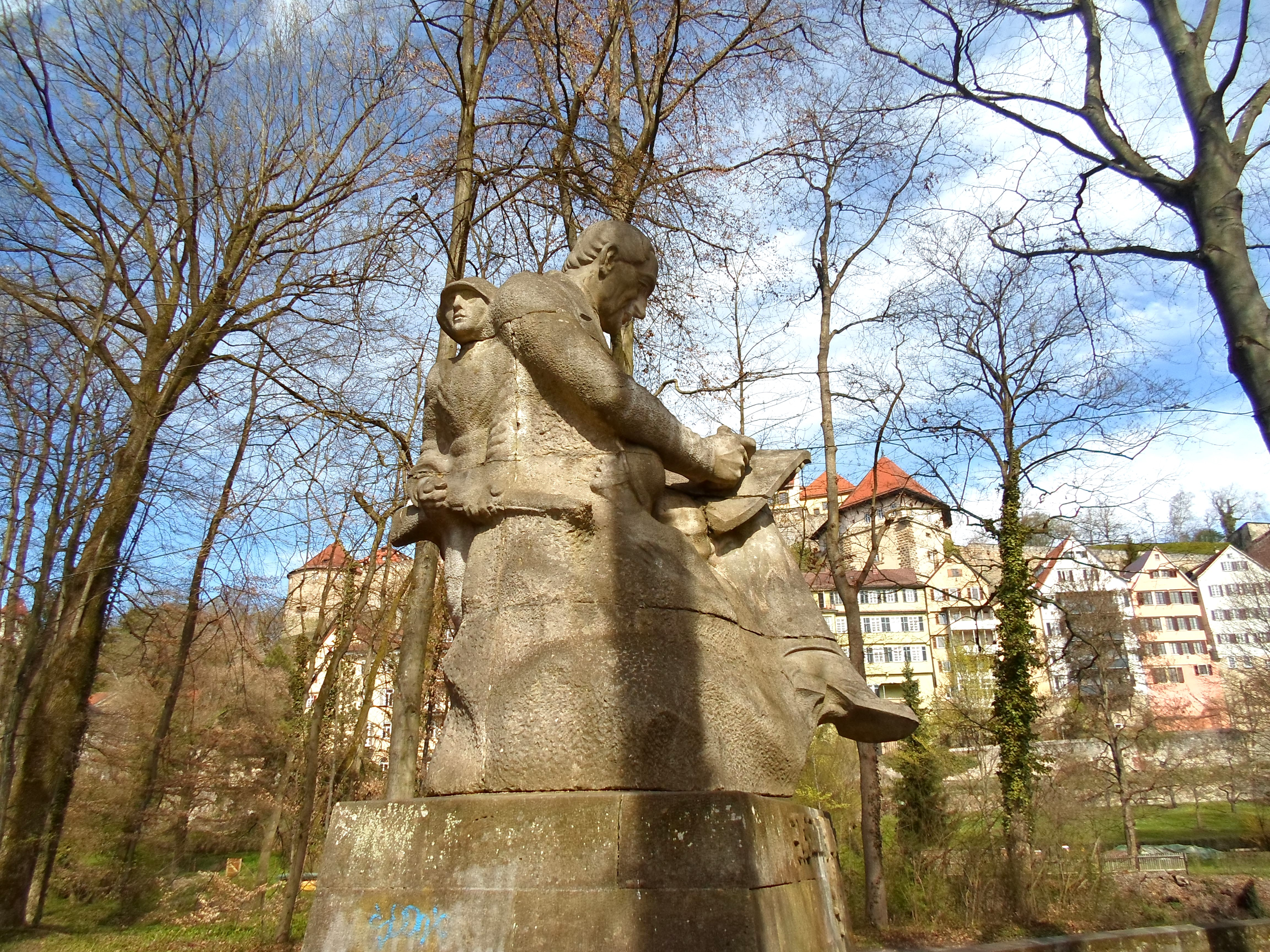
Nazi-era memorial. Soldiers emerge from behind composer Friedrich Silcher.

Controversially, the island retains a relic of the National-Socialist era, a memorial to the nineteenth-century composer and Volkslied collector, Friedrich Silcher. The authorities especially appreciated Silcher's Soldatenlieder, or soldier's songs, which were included in the songbook German soldiers carried in their backpacks during the war. War itself is a theme of the memorial: from behind the seated composer three soldiers advance toward the east, one already falling in battle, and a third locked in a farewell embrace with a woman beside whom marches a child with a rifle over his shoulder. In 2020 the monument was rededicated as a “memorial against the capture of the arts by racist and nationalist forces". A plaque provides historical context.

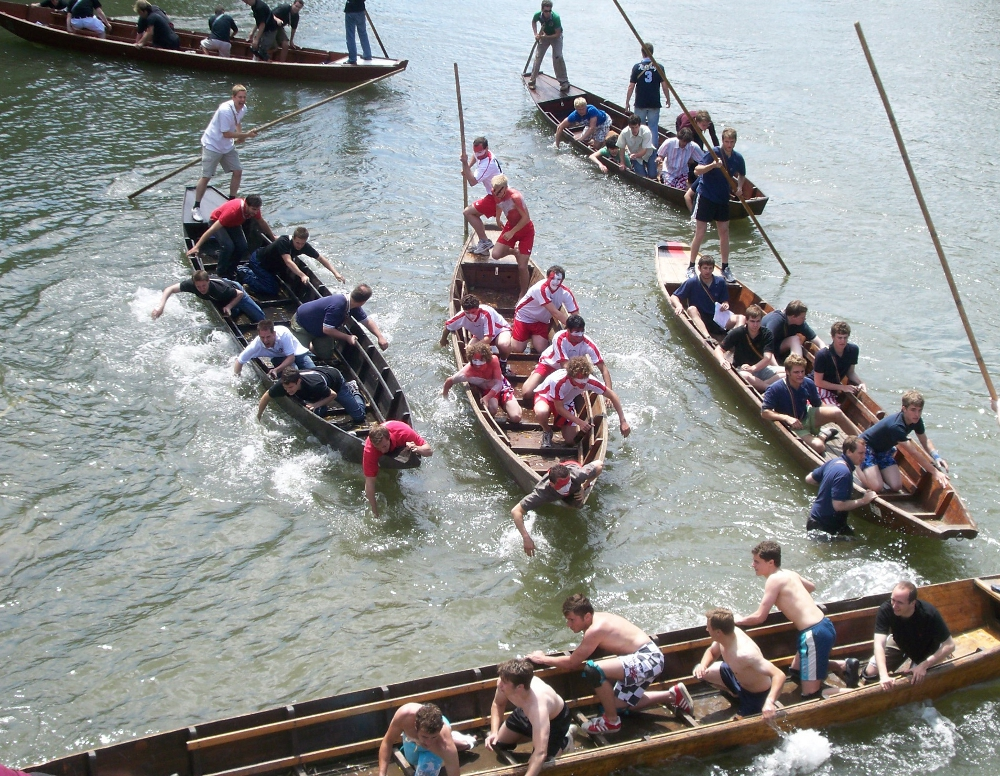
Stocherkahn boats during a race

Students and tourists also come to the Neckar River in the summer to visit beer gardens or go boating in Stocherkähne, the Tübingen equivalent of Oxford and Cambridge punts, only slimmer. A Stocherkahn carries up to 20 people. On the second Thursday of June, all Stocherkahn punts take part in a major race, the Stocherkahnrennen.

Bebenhausen Abbey, the former Cistercian monastery complex that the Kings of Württemberg later maintained as a hunting retreat, lies in the village of Bebenhausen, now a district of the northern fringe of Tübingen. It is a starting point for a Jakobweg, one of a network pilgrimage routes leading toward the popular Camino de Santiago in Spain.

== Government ==
Tübingen is governed by the mayor, elected by citizens every eight years, and by the municipal council, elected by citizens every five years. The current mayor is Boris Palmer, first elected in 2007 and, after the relatively conservative positions he had taken on a number of issues, including immigration, caused him to be dismissed by the Green Party, to a third eight-year term in 2022 with 52% of the vote as an independent

Tübingen's council decided that the city should be climate-neutral by 2030. In 2022, the city was the first in Germany to tax disposable food packaging. Restaurants in Tübingen are charged 50 cents per disposable cup and cardboard bowl, and 20 cents per piece of cutlery.

=== Regional structure ===
Tübingen is the capital of an eponymous district and an eponymous administrative region (Regierungsbezirk), before 1973 called Südwürttemberg-Hohenzollern.

Tübingen and Reutlingen with a population of over 100,000 (about 15 km (9.3 mi) east) form a large centre of the Neckar-Alb region. Both cities are based on a different heritage and always belonged to different administrative entities. While they both had a long lasting rivalry they also complement each other. Reutlingen is more business oriented and industrialised and is successful in engineering and trade, while Tübingen excels in education and science, specialised health care and arts.

The double centre of Tübingen and Reutlingen is surrounded by smaller cities and connected to Albstadt, Balingen, Hechingen, Metzingen, Münsingen, Rottenburg, that each form middle centres and contribute to the high population density of the region.

Administratively, it is not part of the Stuttgart Region, bordering it to the north and west (Böblingen district). However, the city and northern parts of its district can be regarded as belonging to that region in a wider regional and cultural context.

=== Districts ===
Tübingen is divided into 22 districts, the city core of twelve districts (population of about 51,000) and ten outer districts (suburbs) (population of about 31,000):

Core city districts:

- Französisches Viertel
- Österberg
- Schönblick/Winkelwiese
- Lustnau
- Südstadt
- Universität
- Waldhäuser Ost
- Wanne
- Weststadt
- Zentrum

Outer districts:

- Bebenhausen
- Bühl
- Derendingen
- Hagelloch
- Hirschau
- Kilchberg
- Pfrondorf
- Unterjesingen
- Weilheim, Baden-Württemberg

== Culture ==
Tübingen has a notable arts culture as well as nightlife. In addition to the full roster of official and unofficial university events that range from presentations by the university's official poet in residence to parties hosted by the student associations of each faculty, the city can boast of several choirs, theatre companies and nightclubs. Also, Tübingen's Kunsthalle (art exhibition hall), on the "Wanne", houses two or three exhibits of international note each year.

=== Events ===
There are several festivals, open air markets and other events on a regular basis:

- January
  - Arab Movie Festival Arabisches Filmfestival
- April
  - Latin American Movie Festival CineLatino (usually in April or May)
- May
  - Internationales Pianisten-Festival (international festival of pianists)
  - Rock Festival Rock im Tunnel (usually in May or June)
- June
  - Poled boat race (German: Stocherkahnrennen), second Thursday of June, 2pm, around the Neckar Island
  - Ract!festival, an alternative open air festival for free with music performances and workshops
  - Tübinger Wassermusik: concerts on Stocherkahn boats
- July
  - Stadtfest: gastronomy and performances in the streets of the old town
  - Tübinger Sommerinsel festival: various restaurants serving special meals and associations offering activities on the Neckar Island
- August
  - Tübinger Orgelsommer: organ concerts in the St. George's Collegiate Church
  - Sommerkonzerte in the former monastery of Bebenhausen (July–September)
  - Kennen Sie Tübingen? (Do you know Tübingen?): special guided tours on Mondays July–September
- September
  - Vielklang: classic music concerts at several locations
  - Umbrisch-Provenzalischer Markt, open air market for Italian and French products from Umbria and Provence
  - Tübinger Stadtlauf the city 10 km race
  - Retromotor oldtimer festival (usually second or third September weekend)
- October
  - Jazz- und Klassiktage: jazz and classic music festival
  - Kite festival Drachenfest on the Österberg hill (usually third Sunday in October)
  - French movie festival Französische Filmtage
- November
  - Terre de femmes movie festival FrauenWelten
- December
  - Nikolauslauf half marathon outside Tübingen in the forest
  - Die Feuerzangenbowle film and large amount of Feuerzangenbowle drink made in a public square
  - Chocolate festival chocolART
  - Christmas market

== Population ==
=== Population development ===
Since World War II, Tübingen's population has almost doubled from about 45,000 to the current 88,000, also due to the incorporation of formerly independent villages into the city in the 1970s.

Currently, Lord Mayor Boris Palmer (Green Party) has set the ambitious goal of increasing the population of Tübingen to 100,000 within the next several years. To achieve this, the city is closing gaps between buildings within the city proper by allowing new houses to be built there; this is also to counter the tendency of urban sprawl and land consumption that has been endangering the preservation of rural landscapes of Southern Germany.

=== Historical population ===
Historical population

Year	Pop.	±%
1871	16,176	—
1880	19,378	+19.8%
1890	20,913	+7.9%
1900	23,425	+12.0%
1910	28,499	+21.7%
1925	29,971	+5.2%
1933	34,112	+13.8%
1939	35,963	+5.4%

Year	Pop.	±%
1950	44,221	+23.0%
1956	51,454	+16.4%
1961	58,768	+14.2%
1965	63,450	+8.0%
1970	66,788	+5.3%
1975	71,348	+6.8%
1980	73,132	+2.5%
1985	75,825	+3.7%

Year	Pop.	±%
1989	78,643	+3.7%
1996	81,911	+4.2%
2001	82,444	+0.7%
2006	83,557	+1.4%
2011	89,011	+6.5%
2015	87,464	−1.7%
2019	91,506	+4.6%

== Climate ==
Tübingen has an oceanic climate, Cfb in the Köppen climate classification.

Climate data for Tübingen (1991–2020)
Month	Jan	Feb	Mar	Apr	May	Jun	Jul	Aug	Sep	Oct	Nov	Dec	Year
Daily mean °C (°F)	1.3 (34.3)	2.1 (35.8)	5.8 (42.4)	9.9 (49.8)	14.0 (57.2)	17.6 (63.7)	19.3 (66.7)	18.9 (66.0)	14.5 (58.1)	10.0 (50.0)	5.1 (41.2)	2.1 (35.8)	10.0 (50.1)
Average precipitation mm (inches)	45.1 (1.78)	39.8 (1.57)	45.0 (1.77)	44.2 (1.74)	87.2 (3.43)	83.1 (3.27)	89.3 (3.52)	78.4 (3.09)	55.3 (2.18)	58.2 (2.29)	52.7 (2.07)	52.1 (2.05)	730.4 (28.76)
Mean monthly sunshine hours	60.8	86	137.4	181.6	204.8	222.3	240	225.2	166.5	113.1	65	51.7	1,754.4
Source: Deutscher Wetterdienst

== Twin towns – sister cities ==
Tübingen is twinned with:

- Monthey, Switzerland (1950)
- Aix-en-Provence, France (1960)
- Kingersheim, France (1963)
- Ann Arbor, United States (1965) US(A)
- (United Kingdom) Durham, UK (1969)
- Aigle, Switzerland (1973)
- Kilchberg, Switzerland (1981)
- Perugia, Italy (1984)
- Petrozavodsk, Russia (1989)
- Villa El Salvador, Peru (2006)
- Moshi, Tanzania (2014)

For their commitment to their international partnership, the Council of Europe awarded the Europe Prize to Tübingen and Aix-en-Provence in 1965. The city's dedication to European understanding is also reflected in the naming of several streets and squares, including the large Europaplatz (Europe Square) outside the railway station.

== Infrastructure ==
By plane: Tübingen is about 35 km (21.75 mi) from the Baden-Württemberg state airport (Landesflughafen Stuttgart, also called Stuttgart Airport).

By automobile: Tübingen is on the Bundesstraße 27 (a "federal road") that crosses through Baden-Württemberg, connecting the city with Würzburg, Heilbronn, Stuttgart and the Landesflughafen (Stuttgart Airport) to the north and Rottweil and Donaueschingen to the south.

By rail: Tübingen Hauptbahnhof is the terminus of several train lines and a major railway hub. There is the regional train line Neckar-Alb Railway-Bahn (Neckar-Alb-Bahn) from Stuttgart Hauptbahnhof via Esslingen and Reutlingen to Tübingen. The average time of travel to Stuttgart is 1:01 hrs., with some trains taking only 45 mins. Other regional lines are the Hohenzollerische Landesbahn, connecting the city with Hechingen and Sigmaringen (so-called Zollernalb Railway), Zollernalbbahn and connections to Herrenberg (Ammer Valley Railway, Ammertalbahn) and Horb (Upper Neckar Railway, Obere Neckarbahn). Since 2009, there is also a daily direct Intercity link to Mannheim, Cologne and Düsseldorf as well as to Berlin.

Local public transport: The city, due to its high student population, features an extensive public bus network with more than 20 lines connecting the city districts and places outside of Tübingen such as Ammerbuch, Gomaringen and Nagold. There are also several night bus lines in the early hours every day. A direct bus is available to Stuttgart Airport (via Leinfelden-Echterdingen) as well as to Böblingen and Reutlingen.

== Sport ==
Tigers Tübingen are the city's only professional sports team, playing basketball. They play in the Paul Horn-Arena. Women's Handball-Bundesliga team TuS Metzingen hosts its home games at the Paul Horn-Arena.

== Education ==
=== Higher education and research ===
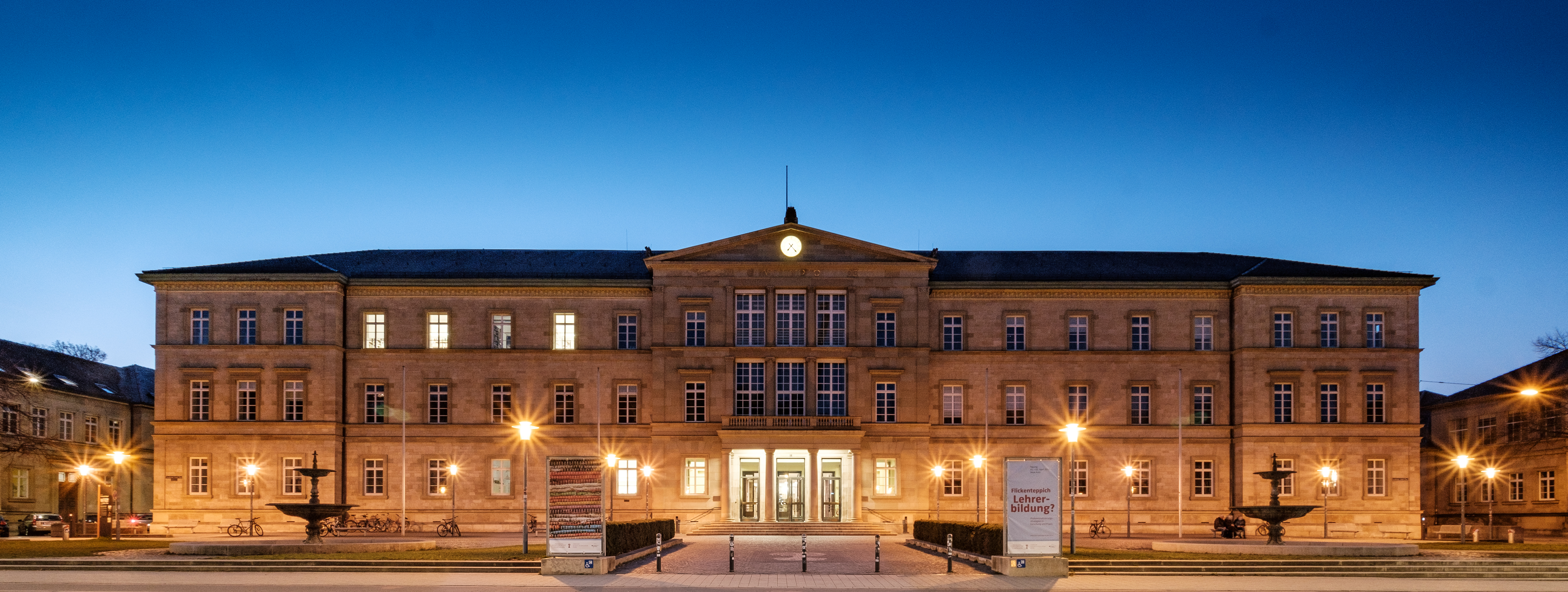
Tübingen University Main Building (Neue Aula)

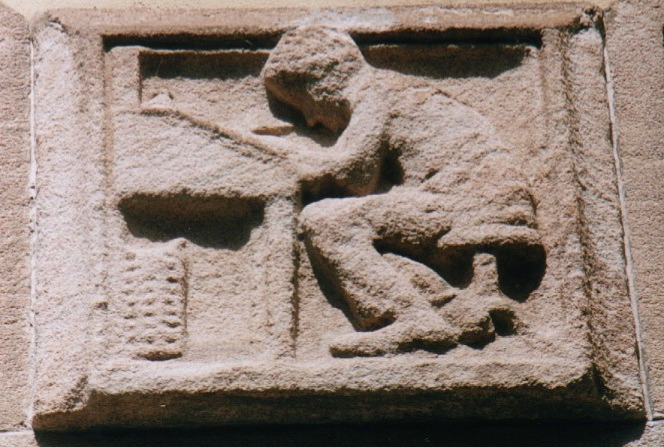
Tübingen student

The Eberhard Karls University of Tübingen dates from 1477, making it one of the oldest in Germany. Including the university hospitals, it is also the city's largest employer. The town is also host to several research institutes including the Max Planck Institutes for Biological Cybernetics, Developmental Biology, Intelligent Systems, The Friedrich Miescher Laboratory of the MPG, and the Max Planck Institute for Biology, the Hertie Institute for Clinical Brain Research, the Werner Reichardt Centre for Integrative Neuroscience and many others. A modern technology park is growing in the northern part of the city, where science, industrial companies and start-ups are conducting joint research, primarily on biotechnology and artificial intelligence. The university also maintains a botanical garden, the Botanischer Garten der Universität Tübingen. Furthermore, there is a Protestant College of Church Music.

=== Schools ===
More than 10,000 children and young adults in Tübingen regularly attend school. There are 30 schools in the city, some of which consist of more than one type of school. Of these, 17 are primary schools while the others are for secondary education: four schools are of the lowest rank, Hauptschule, three of the middle rank, Realschule, and six are Gymnasien (grammar schools). There also are four vocational schools (Berufsschule) and three special needs schools.

Primary schools

- Freie Aktive Schule Tübingen
- Grundschule Innenstadt / Silcherschule
- Grundschule Weilheim
- Ludwig-Krapf-Schule
- Grundschule Hügelstraße
- Französische Schule
- Dorfackerschule Lustnau
- Grundschule Hirschau
- Grundschule Hechinger Eck
- Grundschule auf der Wanne
- Grundschule Aischbach
- Grundschule Winkelwiese / Waldhäuser Ost
- Grundschule Bühl
- Grundschule Bühl
- Grundschule Kilchberg
- Grundschule Hagelloch
- Grundschule Pfrondorf
- Grundschule Unterjesingen

Hauptschulen

- Dorfackerschule Lustnau
- Mörikeschule
- Geschwister-Scholl-Schule
- Hauptschule Innenstadt

Realschulen

- Walter-Erbe-Realschule
- Albert-Schweitzer-Realschule
- Geschwister-Scholl-Schule

Gymnasien

- Carlo-Schmid-Gymnasium
- Geschwister-Scholl-Schule
- Kepler-Gymnasium
- Uhland-Gymnasium
- Wildermuth-Gymnasium
- Freie Waldorfschule

Vocational schools (Berufsschulen)

- Gewerbliche Schule
- Wilhelm-Schickard-Schule
- Mathilde-Weber-Schule
- Bildungs- und Technologiezentrum

== Notable people ==
- Rudolph II, Count Palatine of Tübingen (died 1247)
- Pier Paolo Vergerio the Younger (1498–1565), ecclesiastical diplomat, Catholic bishop and later Protestant reformer, lived and died here
- Primož Trubar (1508–1586), Protestant reformer of the Lutheran tradition, lived and died here
- Johann Ludwig Brassicanus (1509–1549), an advisor to the Habsburg monarchy.
- Christopher Besoldus (1577–1638), lawyer and publicist.
- Rudolf Jakob Camerarius (1665–1721), botanist and physician.
- Johann Georg Gmelin (1709–1755), naturalist, botanist and explorer of Siberia
- Philipp Friedrich Gmelin (1721–1768), botanist and chemist
- Jeremiah Meyer RA (1735–1789), English miniature painter.
- Samuel Gottlieb Gmelin (1744–1774), physician and botanist
- Johann Friedrich Gmelin (1748–1804), chemist and botanist
- Johann Friedrich Cotta (1764–1832), publisher of many important writers of his time, industrial pioneer and politician; took over the local family publishing business.
- Ferdinand Gottlieb von Gmelin (1782–1848), physician
- Ludwig Uhland (1787–1862), poet and philologist, lawyer and politician, a leading figure of the German revolutions of 1848–1849 as a member of national parliament, lived and died here.
- Friedrich Silcher (1789–1860), composer, lived and died here
- Christian Gottlob Gmelin (1792–1860), chemist, re. lithium salts
- Johann Ludwig Krapf (1810–1881), missionary in East Africa.
- Friedrich von Payer (1847-1931), politician and statesman
- Friedrich von Huene (1875–1969), paleontologist re. dinosaurs
- Hermann Hesse (1877–1962), poet, novelist and painter, local bookseller trainee in 1895–1899, Nobel Prize in Literature in 1946
- Ernst Fritz Schmid (1904–1960), musicologist and Mozart scholar
- Sir Geoffrey Elton (1921–1994), political historian
- Walter Schultheiß (1924–2025), actor, author and painter
- Felicia Langer (1930–2018), attorney and human rights activist, lived and died here
- Werner Spies (born 1937), art historian and journalist
- Helmut Haussmann (born 1943), academic and politician
- Hans-Peter Uhl (1944–2019), politician (CSU)
- Hartmut Zinser (born 1944), scholar in religious studies
- Eva Haule (born 1954), former RAF terrorist
- Vera Wülfing-Leckie (1954–2021), homeopath and translator
- Matthias Untermann (born 1956), art historian and archaeologist
- Viola Vogel (born 1959), biophysicist and bioengineer
- Michael Theurer (born 1967), politician (FDP) and MEP
- Matthias Lammert (born 1968), politician
- Despina Vandi (born 1969), Greek singer
- Clemens Schick (born 1972), actor
- Boris Palmer (born 1972), current Lord Mayor
- Max Hofmann (born 1974), Head of News at Deutsche Welle
- Benjamin Heisenberg (born 1974), film director and screenwriter
- Sung Yu-ri (born 1981), a South Korean actress and singer.

=== Sport ===
- Sigi Schmid (1953–2018), football coach
- Uwe Dreher (1960–2016), former footballer (300 games)
- Dieter Baumann (born 1965), track and field athlete, Olympic gold and silver medallist, lives here
- Marvin Compper (born 1985), football manager and a former player
- Kim Bui (born 1989), a retired Olympic artistic gymnast.
- Thilo Kehrer (born 1996), football player (27 x national team)
- Amelie Berger (born 1999), handball player (61 x national team)

== Alumni from the university ==
- Johann Reuchlin (1455–1522), Catholic humanist and scholar of Greek and Hebrew
- Philip Melanchthon (1497–1560), Lutheran reformer
- Johannes Kepler (1571–1630), astronomer, mathematician, and astrologer
- Wilhelm Schickard (1592–1635), professor of Hebrew and astronomy, inventor of the world's first mechanical calculator, lived and died here.
- Gottfried Heinrich Graf zu Pappenheim (1594–1632), a field marshal of the Holy Roman Empire, studied here.
- Rudolf Jakob Camerarius (1655–1721), botanist and professor, proved for the first time the sexual reproduction of plants.
- Christoph Martin Wieland (1733–1813), classical writer of the Enlightenment
- Sir James Steuart Denham, 8th Baronet (1744–1839), a Scottish soldier of the British Army, Uni attendance, 1757 to 1761
- J. G. Friedrich von Bohnenberger (1765–1835), pioneer of a modern geodesy, inventor of the gyroscope
- Georg Wilhelm Friedrich Hegel (1770–1831), philosopher of Idealism, studied here.
- Friedrich Hölderlin (1770–1843), poet and philosopher, studied, lived and died here.
- Friedrich Wilhelm Joseph Schelling (1775–1854), philosopher of Idealism, studied here.
- Friedrich List (1789–1846), economist, university professor
- Ferdinand Christian Baur (1792–1860), Protestant theologian, lived and died here.
- Immanuel Hermann Fichte (1796–1879), philosopher, held a chair of philosophy at the university.
- Wilhelm Hauff (1802–1827), writer of the early Romantic period
- Eduard Mörike (1804–1875), Lutheran pastor, poet and writer of the Romantic period
- David Strauss (1808–1874), Protestant theologian and writer
- Adelbert von Keller (1812–1883), a German philologist, studied locally.
- Georg Herwegh (1817–1875), poet, revolutionist
- Felix Hoppe-Seyler (1825–1895), founded the disciplines of biochemistry and molecular biology, discovered the blood pigment haemoglobin
- Lothar Meyer (1830–1895), chemist, one of the founders of the periodic table of chemical elements alongside Dmitri Mendeleev
- Gustav Tschermak von Seysenegg (1836–1927), an Austrian mineralogist, local PhD
- Franz Xaver von Funk (1840–1907), a Catholic theologian and historian, educated locally
- Friedrich Miescher (1844–1895), physician and biologist, discoverer of the nucleic acid as a precondition for the identification of DNA
- Ferdinand Braun (1850–1918), inventor, professor, Nobel Prize in Physics, 1909
- Carl Correns (1864–1933), botanist and geneticist
- Alois Alzheimer (1864–1915), psychiatrist and neuropathologist
- Gerhard Anschütz (1867–1948), jurisprudent
- Albert Schweitzer (1875–1965), theologian, writer, humanitarian, philosopher and physician, Nobel Peace Prize, 1952
- Ernst Bloch (1885–1977), philosopher, lived and died here.
- Gerhard Rohlfs (1892–1986), Romance linguist, lived and died here.
- Kurt Georg Kiesinger (1904–1988), politician, Chancellor of Germany 1966–69, lived and died here.
- Dietrich Bonhoeffer (1906–1945), Lutheran theologian and pastor, anti-Nazi-dissident, studied here.
- Hans Mayer (1907–2001), literary scholar and critic, lived and died here.
- Walter Jens (1923–2013), philologist, writer and university professor of rhetoric, lived and died here.
- Martin Walser (1927–2023), writer, studied here.
- Pope Benedict XVI (1927–2022), held a chair of dogmatic theology at the university 1966–69
- Hans Küng (1928–2021), Roman-Catholic theologian and author, professor of theology, critic of the official church, creator of Foundation for a Global Ethic (Stiftung Weltethos), lived and died here.
- Ralf Dahrendorf (1929–2009), held a chair of sociology.
- Manfred Korfmann (1942–2005), archaeologist and professor, excavator of ancient Troy
- Christiane Nüsslein-Volhard (born 1942), developmental biologist and Nobel Prize in Physiology or Medicine, 1995
- Horst Köhler (born 1943), politician, President of Germany 2004–2010

== See also ==
- Deutsch-Amerikanisches Institut Tübingen
- Tübingen Tarock, a form of Tarot game from Tübingen
