= Schwalldorf =

- Part of Rottenburg am Neckar
- Coat of arms
- Interactive map of Schwalldorf
- Location within Germany Location within Baden-Württemberg
- Coordinates: 48°27′01″N 08°52′27″E
- Country: Germany
- State: Baden-Württemberg
- Admin. region: Tübingen
- District: Tübingen
- Town: Rottenburg am Neckar

Government
  - Mayor: Daniela Steiger

Area
  - Total: 5.81 km^{2} (2.24 sq mi)
- Elevation: 492 m (1,614 ft)

Population (2018)
  - Total: 772
  - Density: 133/km^{2} (344/sq mi)
- Time zone: UTC+01:00 (CET)
  - Summer (DST): UTC+02:00 (CEST)
- Postal codes: 72108
- Dialling codes: (+49) 07472
- Vehicle registration: TÜ
- Website: www.rottenburg.de

Schwalldorf (pronounced [ˈʃvaldɔʁf]) is a suburban district of Rottenburg am Neckar in the administrative district of Tübingen in Baden-Württemberg (Germany).

== Geography ==
Schwalldorf is located 7 km (4.35 mi) southwestern from Rottenburg am Neckar on the Gäu-Plateau with an elevation from 360 to 492 m.

=== Extent ===
The area of the district is 581 hectares (1,440 acres). Of the district's area, 65.1% is used for agricultural purposes, 25.6% is forest area, 8.6% consists of settlements and roads, and 2.2% other.

=== Neighbour localities ===
The territories of the following villages adjoin Schwalldorf; they are, clockwise, beginning with the north: Bad Niedernau, Weiler, Dettingen, Hirrlingen, Frommenhausen, Bieringen and Obernau (all in the admin. district of Tübingen). All bordering villages, except for Hirrlingen, are suburbs of Rottenburg am Neckar.

== Population ==
With a population of 772 people (31 July 2018), Schwalldorf is among the smaller districts of Rottenburg. With an area of 5.81 km^{2} (2.2 sq mi), this corresponds to a population density of 130 people per km^{2}, or 340 per sq mi.

=== Faiths ===
The population of the village is predominantly Roman Catholic. About 100 people are evangelical. A small amount are nondenominational or members of another denomination.

== History ==
Around 1100 Schwalldorf was mentioned for the first time in a paper from the Hirsau Abbey (German: Kloster Hirsau). In that document a nobleman Fridericus de Swaldorff (Frederic of Schwalldorf) was mentioned. The first official reference in a deed of gift dates from 7 July 1304. Heinrich der Amman (Henry the Amman), the reeve of the Counts of Hohenberg, gave a gift to the Dominican nunnery in Kirchberg: a manor in Schwalldorf. Based on that document, the village celebrated its 700th anniversary in 2004.

However, it is assumed that the village is much older. The suffix "-dorf" gives a reason to suppose an appearance in the 7th or 8th century. Scores of excavation findings also allude to it, but the only real record is the deed of gift from 7 July 1304.

In 1357 a chapel was mentioned. At that time Schwalldorf was a subsidiary of the parish of Dettingen, which belonged to the commandry of the Knights Hospitaller in Hemmendorf. In a deed of 28 August 1437 a Kaplanei (vicariate) was founded in Schwalldorf. In the deed the patron Saint Andrew was mentioned for the first time. In 1507 Schwalldorf got its own parish. The chapel became a parish church.

From 1381 to 1806 the village belonged to the territory of Niederhohenberg (Lower Hohenberg) of the County of Hohenberg. In 1381 Rudolf III, Count of Hohenberg, sold the county in large part to the House of Habsburg. Schwalldorf and large parts of the county thus became a part of Further Austria. For this reason the reformation could not take place around Rottenburg. All thoughts of reformation were defeated by the archduke of Austria. The exclave of Austria remained Catholic. In 1805 the county was assigned to the Dukedom of Württemberg by the Peace of Pressburg. Württemberg became a kingdom in 1806, a few days after the treaty was enacted.

When in 1807 the Oberamt Rottenburg (Oberamt of Württemberg) was founded, Schwalldorf became a part of it. Rottenburg was also the domicile of an Austrian Oberamt before the county came to Württemberg. In 1934 the appellation Oberamt was replaced by Kreis ('district'). The District of Rottenburg was dissolved in 1938 and merged into the District of Tübingen. Since then Schwalldorf has been a part of the District of Tübingen. On 1 January 1972 the municipality of Schwalldorf was incorporated into the town of Rottenburg am Neckar.

== Politics ==
=== Schultheißen, mayors and local representatives ===
The first Schultheiß of Schwalldorf was mentioned in 1425. The Schultheiß was the chairperson of the village court (precursor of the council). The name of the first Schultheiß is not known. On 10 July 1470 Hans Gefrör was mentioned as the second Schultheiß in a document.

Year	Schultheiß
1425	Unknown
1470	Hans Gefrör
1472	Hans Eckenweiler
1560, 1576	Hans Linsenmann
1594	Michael Herrmann
1637	Johannes Miller
1658	Martin Straub
1680	Hans Flach
1721–1737	Hans Jerg Flach
1738	Adam Teufel
1757	Ulrich Linsenmann
vor 1768	Konrad Kauß

Year	Schultheiß
1768	Jakob Mayer
1770	Bernhard Flach
1791	Stefan Zettel
1798	Isidor Baum
1804–1807	Josef Straub
1808–1817	Thomas Straub
1817–1820	Thomas Daub
1821–1841	Jakob Flach
1841–1848	Johannes Letzgus
1848–1860	Johannes Linsenmann
1860–1886	Clemens Kienzle
1886–1917	Zacharias Baur

Mayors from 1917 until 1972

In 1917 the term Schultheiß was replaced by mayor.

- 1917–1940: Lukas Jungel
- 1940–1945: Jakob U. Wiest (without election)
- 1946–1972: Fabian Straub

Local representatives since 1972

When the Municipality of Schwalldorf was incorporated into the Town of Rottenburg on 1 January 1972, the mayor was replaced by a local representative (Ortsvorsteher). The local representative is elected by the members of the advisory body for a period of five years. The local representative is the chairperson of the advisory body and the spokesperson of the suburb.

- 1972–1979: Fabian Straub
- 1980–1989: Adolf Straub
- 1989–2004: Ernst Rößner, senior prosecutor
- 2004-2019: Klaus Krajewski
- since 2019: Daniela Steiger

=== Advisory body ===
In Schwalldorf there has been a village court since the 15th century, which was directed by the Schultheiß. The village court is regarded as the precursor of the later council. The names of the councillors of the former municipality of Schwalldorf are passed down since 1932. The council of the former municipality had up to ten councillors in the terms of office since 1932.

In 1972 the council of the municipality was dissolved and replaced by an advisory body (German: Ortschaftsrat) in the course of the incorporation of the municipality into the Town of Rottenburg. The advisory body is elected by the citizens of the village for a period of five years. The advisory body represents the interests of the citizens of the suburb towards the town administration and the town council. Thereby the advisory body acts as administrative body. In the first session the advisory body also elects the local representative for a period of five years. The current advisory body was elected on 26 May 2019. All seven members of the body are from the voter's association Bürgerliste Schwalldorf ('Citizen's List Schwalldorf').

=== Coat of arms ===
Coat of arms of Schwalldorf

The coat of arms of the village was designed in 1952. It was adopted as official seal by the Municipality of Schwalldorf. The coat of arms shows a blue swallow and a blue auger snail divided by a blue waved fess on a silver shield. The blue auger snail below the waved fess refers to the Schneckenhof ('snail yard'), which is one of the two settlement cores the village emerged from. The blue waved fess shows a water amount and interprets the name of Schwalldorf, that shall derive from a well. In the area of the village, however, there is no water. Another theory, which is more folk etymological, is represented by the blue swallow (German: Schwalbe) above the fess. Due to the fact that the village is a Frankish-Alemannic village, the most likely theory is that the village name derives from an Alemannic clan ruler named Swalo.

== Culture and Sights ==
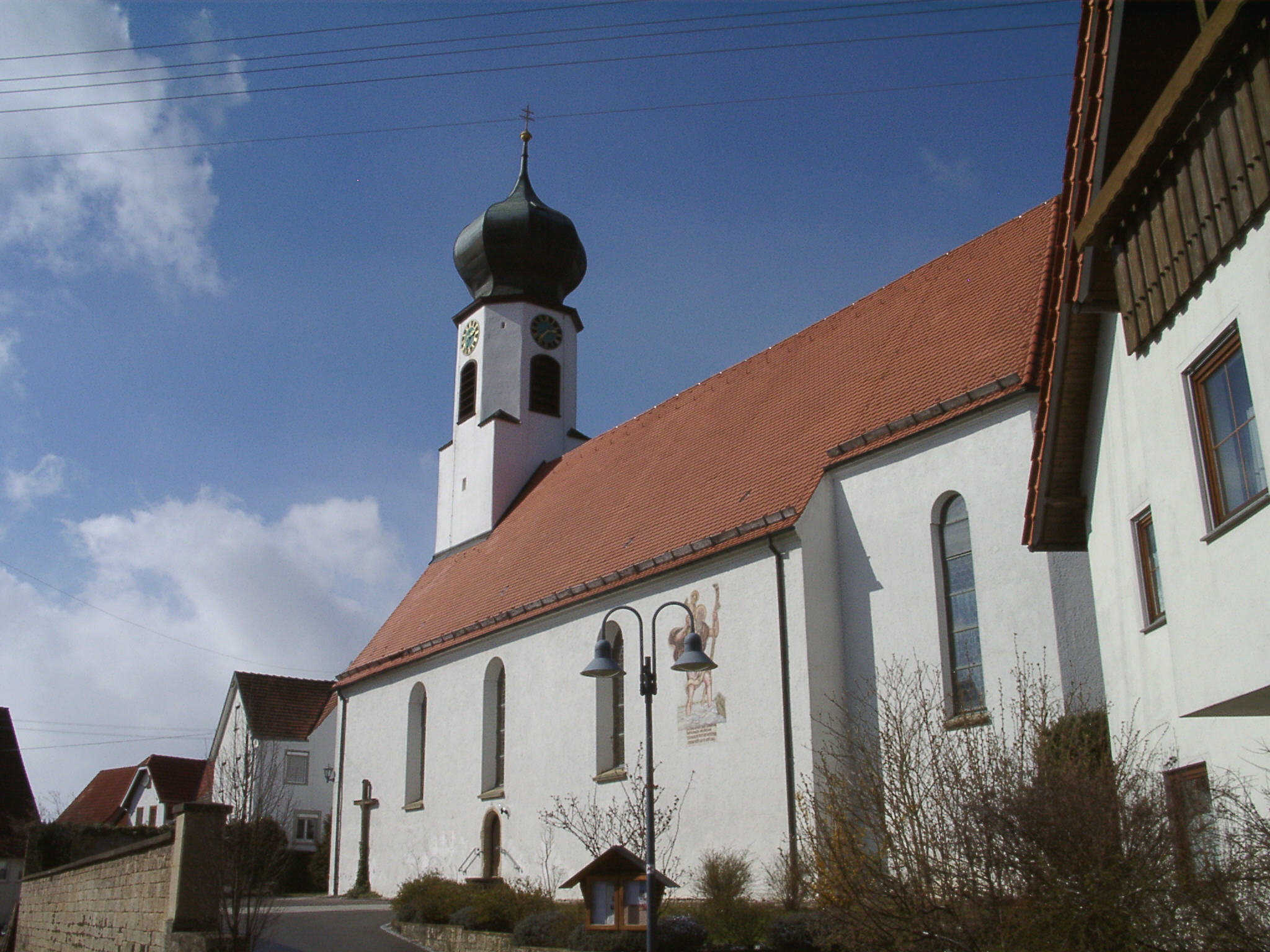
St Andrew's Church

=== Buildings ===
==== St Andrew's parish church ====
Today's parish church was built in 1733 in baroque style and is consecrated to the Holy Andrew. Earlier there was a chapel which was mentioned for the first time in 1357, and that was, according to a document from 1437, consecrated to Saint Andrew as well. In 1507 Schwalldorf got its own parish and the chapel became a parish church. When the old church became too small for the growing congregation, it was decided to build a new church in 1732.

=== Associations and Institutions ===
==== Associations ====
- Liederkranz Schwalldorf 1892 e. V. – a male choral society founded in 1892
- Schützenverein Schwalldorf 1928 e. V. – Schwalldorf Shooting Club, founded in1928
- Sportverein Schwalldorf 1968 e. V. – Schwalldorf Sports Club, founded in 1968
- Narrenzunft Schwalldorf 1989 e. V. – Swabian-Alemannic Carnival Guild, founded in 1989

e. V. stands for eingetragener Verein, meaning 'registered association'. The association is inscribed (with the official name) in the register of associations at the local court.

==== Institutions ====
- Auxiliary fire brigade (1886)
- Catholic Parish
- Church choir
- Catholic public library
- St Franziskus Parish Hall
- St Andrew Catholic Kindergarten
- Schwalldorf-Frommenhausen Elementary School
- Youth club

==== Dissolved associations and Institutions ====
Former associations and institutions in Schwalldorf that have been dissolved:

- 1886–1945: Kriegerverein Schwalldorf 1886 e. V. – Schwalldorf Warrior Association (1886–1945)
- 1908–1965: Spar- und Darlehenskasse Schwalldorf – Savings and loan association
- 1923–1963: Dreschgenossenschaft Schwalldorf
- 1930–1970: Viehversicherungsverein
- 1934–1978: Milchverwertungsgenossenschaft
- 1956: Flurbereinigungs-Teilnehmerschaft
- 1997–2007: Kulturverein "Treffpunkt Schule" e. V. – School Meeting Place Cultural Association

=== Regular events ===
- Swabian-Alemannic Fasnet: The Fasnet ('Swabian-Alemannic Carnival') has a high significance in the area of Rottenburg. A Vassnacht was first documented in Rottenburg in the 15th century. In the Catholic town of Rottenburg and nearby, wild parties have become a tradition. The first carnival group in Schwalldorf was the Elbenlocher Hexen ('witches of the Elbenloch'), in Swabian dialect Elbaloch Hexa. It was founded in 1984. The Elbenloch is a forest on the boundary of Schwalldorf. According to a legend the Elbenloch was a meeting place for witches in the Middle Ages. During the Middle Ages, Rottenburg was a center for witch hunts. The carnival group Elbenlocher Hexen is an allusion to that. In 1989 the Narrenzunft Schwalldorf ('Schwalldorf Carnival Guild') was founded. Nowadays the Carnival Guild has three carnival groups, two music groups and several single characters. The Fasnet season begins officially on 6 January with the traditional dusting of the wood masks. The so-called Fleggafasnet (Swabian for 'village carnival') with the parade takes place on Saturday, one week before the Hauptfasnet ('Main Fasnet'). The Hauptfasnet is the time from Fat Thursday to Ash Wednesday and is the high season for carnival in Rottenburg. In the past few years, more than one thousand participants from approximately 30–40 carnival guilds attended the parade in Schwalldorf.
- Onion Tart Festival: On the last weekend of summer vacation (usually the first or second weekend in September), local associations arrange the Zwiebelbeeten Fest ('Onion Tart Festival'). It is a small contemplative festival in the village core. The festival has been held since 1986 and has established itself as a village fair.

== Infrastructure ==
The village is remote from primary traffic routes. Unlike in other suburbs of Rottenburg, a great population increase has not been registered in the past decades.

=== Telecommunication ===
Until a modification of the local network in 2005, internet access was only possible with ISDN. Since then DSL light (384 kbit/s) has been available on some streets. A faster Internet connection is not possible due to old wires. A modernization of the connection is refused by Deutsche Telekom because of little profitability. The village has about 250 households. Deutsche Telekom requires a minimum number of 300 households demanding a faster connection in order for the old wires to be replaced; though there are those, especially seniors, who are not interested in a faster broadband connection.

Several suburbs of Rottenburg are concerned about slow internet connection speeds. In July 2008 a citizens' group for DSL was founded in Bieringen, a neighboring village of Schwalldorf. The aim was to reach a faster Internet connection by radio. In addition a radio mast would have had to be built on the plateau near Schwalldorf. However, in August the plan was canceled, because the town administration of Rottenburg announced an open call for tender. If the project succeeds, DSL at a speed of probably 16,000 kbit/s will be available in Schwalldorf.{{

=== Traffic ===
The Kreisstraße 6943 (K 6943, district road 6943) leads from Bad Niedernau (Rottenburg) or Frommenhausen into the village. The road was formerly known as Landstraße 392 (L 392, state road 392), before it was downgraded to a district road. The K 6943 serves as a communication road between the L 370 (Horb-Rottenburg-Tübingen) and the L 392 (Hirrlingen-Felldorf). It discharges into the L 392 in Frommenhausen and into the L 370 next to Bad Niedernau. The volume of traffic is low, so there is very little noise exposure.

=== Public transport ===
For local public transport, there is a bus connection between Rottenburg and Horb am Neckar or Felldorf – bus route 7626. The village is situated in sector 112 of the Neckar-Alb-Donau Transportation Association. On workdays (Monday–Friday) buses run roughly every hour from about 6:00 a.m. until 7:00 p.m. On Saturday there is a route at a regular interval of two hours from about 7:30 a.m. until 5:00 p.m. Buses run only by request (Anmeldefahrten) between 7:00 p.m. and midnight on workdays, as well as Friday to Saturday night and Saturday to Sunday night. The bus has to be requested at least 60 minutes before departure according to the schedule.

=== Education ===
Schwalldorf has a kindergarten and an elementary school. St. Andreas kindergarten is a Roman Catholic kindergarten and was originally organized by nuns, though it is also open to non-Catholic children. The elementary school was opened in 1995 and has no special name. It is named Grundschule Schwalldorf-Frommenhausen ('Schwalldorf-Frommenhausen Elementary School'). Frommenhausen is the neighbouring village.

== Personalities ==
=== Sons and daughters of the village ===
Noteworthy persons who were born in Schwalldorf:

- Michael Mayer (1833–1892), sculptor
- Lukas Jungel (1886–1940), Mayor, victim of National Socialism

=== Persons who lived in the village ===
Noteworthy persons who acted there:

- Franz Egger (1882–1945), parish priest, victim of National Socialism

== Literature ==
- 700 Jahre Schwalldorf by Karlheinz Geppert and various other authors, 2004 ISBN 3-924123-51-9

700 Jahre Schwalldorf ('700 Years Schwalldorf') was published on the occasion of the 700th anniversary of the village in 2004.

== Sources ==
- Karlheinz Geppert: "700 Jahre Schwalldorf", 2004 ISBN 3-924123-51-9
- www.rottenburg.de
