= Erwin Weinmann =

German Nazi SS officer (1909–unknown)

- Born: 8 July 1905; Frommenhausen, Kingdom of Württemberg, German Empire
- Died: 9 June 1949 (declared dead)
- Education: University of Tübingen
- Military career
- Allegiance: Nazi Germany
- Branch: Schutzstaffel
- Service years: 1936–1945
- Rank: SS-Oberführer und Oberst der Polizei
- Unit: Reich Security Main Office
- Commands: Commander, Sonderkommando 4a; Befehlshaber der Sicherheitspolizei und des SD, Protectorate of Bohemia-Moravia
- Conflicts: World War II
- Awards: War Merit Cross, 2nd class with swords

Erwin Weinmann (6 July 1909 – disappeared 1945, declared dead 9 June 1949) was a German physician, SS-Oberführer and Oberst of police. He served in the Reich Security Main Office as chief of the Gestapo section that was in charge of suppressing opposition in the occupied territories. During the Second World War, he was the commander of Sonderkommando 4a that carried out the mass murder of Jews in Reichskommissariat Ukraine from 1941 to 1942. He then became the last commander of the security police and the SD in the Protectorate of Bohemia-Moravia. He went missing at the end of the war and was legally declared dead in 1949.

== Early life and education ==
Weinmann was born in Frommenhausen, a suburb of Rottenburg am Neckar, the son of a teacher who died in the First World War. He was the younger brother of Ernst Weinmann who would become the Oberbürgermeister of Tübingen from 1939 to 1945.

Weinmann began his National Socialist activities while still a secondary school student in Rottweil. In 1927, he began studying medicine at the University of Tübingen, where the National Socialist German Students' League (NSDStB) was already well established. On 1 December 1931, he formally joined the Nazi Party (membership number 774,436), the NSDStB and the Sturmabteilung (SA), the Nazi paramilitary organization. He would rise to the rank of SA-Sturmhauptführer. In July 1932, the NSDStB gained a majority of the seats in the Tübingen General Student Committee (AStA) and Weinmann was elected as the NSDStB faction leader in the AStA during the summer semester of 1932. While a student at Tübingen, he was also a member of the student corps Ghibellinia. After completing his studies, and earning a doctorate in medicine, Weinmann worked as a physician at the hospital at Tübingen University until the fall of 1936.

== Career in the SS ==
On 30 January 1937, Weinmann joined the Schutzstaffel (SS) with membership number 280,196, was commissioned as an SS-Obersturmführer and was soon promoted to SS-Hauptsturmführer on 20 April. The chief of SD-Oberabschnitt (upper district) Südwest in Stuttgart, Gustav Adolf Scheel, was also a University of Tübingen-trained physician. He recruited Weinmann and several other former Tübingen Nazi student activists (Erich Ehrlinger, Martin Sandberger, Eugen Steimle and Walter Stahlecker) into the Sicherheitsdienst (SD), the SS intelligence service. Weinmann became the staff chief of SD-Oberabschnitt Südwest. In October 1937, he was assigned as the staff leader of SD-Oberabschnitt Ost in Berlin. In March 1941, he was transferred to the Reich Security Main Office (RSHA) as chief of Gestapo Office Group IV D, which had jurisdiction over the suppression of all opposition in the occupied territories. In 1940, he was awarded the War Merit Cross, second class with swords, "for cleansing Lorraine of elements hostile to the people and the Reich".

Seven months after the June 1941 invasion of the Soviet Union, Weinmann replaced Paul Blobel as head of Sonderkommando 4a of Einsatzgruppe C on 13 January 1942, and was engaged in conducting Holocaust operations against the Jews of the Reichskommissariat Ukraine until July. Promoted to SS-Standartenführer and Oberst of police in September 1942, he succeeded Horst Böhme as the last Befehlshaber der Sicherheitspolizei und des SD (Commander of the Security Police and SD) in the Protectorate of Bohemia-Moravia, headquartered in Prague. At a meeting of senior occupation administrators, Weinmann described the Czech population as consisting of a thin layer of Czechs that were loyal to the Nazis, a somewhat larger layer that were undecided and an "overwhelming layer of Czechs who reject and are hostile to the Reich and everything German". This attitude contributed to the harsh measures imposed by the occupation regime. In December 1944, Weinmann was promoted to SS-Oberführer.

== Post-war disappearance ==
Toward the end of the war in Europe, Weinmann went missing during the Prague uprising. There were reports that he died in the fighting and, on 9 June 1949, he was declared dead by the Landesgericht (regional court) in Reutlingen. However, suspicions persisted that he had escaped via the ratlines to either Egypt or Spain.

In December 1965, the government of Czechoslovakia notified West Germany of its intent to seek the extradition of Weinmann to face charges for crimes that he committed while in Prague. As late as 1972, there were reports that Weinmann was living in Alexandria. At that time, a request by the Czechoslovak Association of Former Partisans and Anti-Nazi Fighters to the Czech government to have him extradited from Egypt was refused due to foreign policy considerations. Weinmann was never apprehended or brought to trial.

== See also ==
- Occupation of Czechoslovakia (1938–1945)
- The Holocaust in Bohemia and Moravia

== Sources ==
- Klee, Ernst (2007). Das Personenlexikon zum Dritten Reich. Wer war was vor und nach 1945. Frankfurt-am-Main: Fischer-Taschenbuch-Verlag. ISBN 978-3-596-16048-8.
- MacDonald, Callum; Kaplan, Jan (1995). Prague in the Shadow of the Swastika: A History of the German Occupation 1939-1945. Melantrich Publishers. ISBN 978-8-070-23211-8.
- Suppan, Arnold (2013). Hitler – Beneš – Tito: Konflikt, Krieg und Völkermord in Ostmittel- und Südosteuropa. Austrian Academy of Sciences Press. ISBN 978-3-700-17309-0.
