= Dettingen =

Dettingen may refer to:

== Municipalities ==
- Dettingen an der Erms in the district of Reutlingen in Baden-Württemberg
- Dettingen an der Iller in the district of Biberach in Baden-Württemberg
- Dettingen unter Teck in the district of Esslingen in Baden-Württemberg

== Parts of cities and municipalities ==
- Dettingen (Horb) is part of the city of Horb am Neckar in the district of Freudenstadt in Baden-Württemberg
- Dettingen (Rottenburg) is a part of the City of Rottenburg am Neckar in the district of Tübingen in Baden-Württemberg
- Dettingen (Ehingen) is part of Ehingen in the Alb-Donau in Baden-Württemberg
- Dettingen (Konstanz), is part of Konstanz in Baden-Württemberg
- Dettingen am Albuch is part of the municipality Gerstetten (Heidenheim district in Baden-Württemberg)
- Dettingen am Main is part of the municipality Karlstein am Main (Aschaffenburg district in Bavaria)

== Other ==
- Battle of Dettingen, which took place in what is now Karlstein am Main, which led to the naming of:
  - Dettingen Te Deum, a canticle composed by George Frideric Handel
  - Dettingen Company, a training company at the Royal Military Academy Sandhurst
  - Dettingen Park, a housing development in Deepcut, Surrey, UK, built on the former Alma Dettingen Barracks Princess Royal Barracks
