= Zimmerbach (Starzel) =

River in Germany

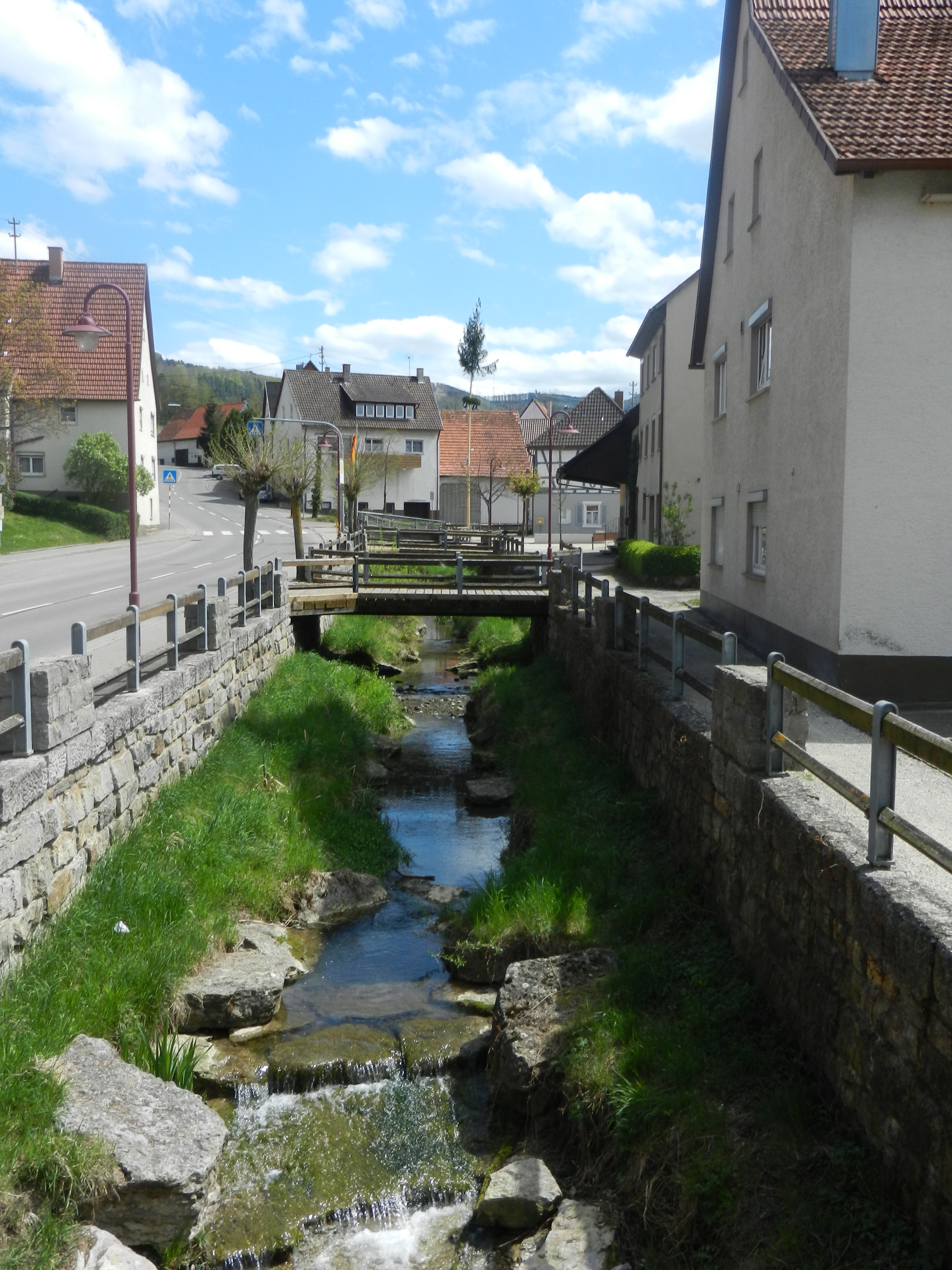

- Mouth of Zimmerbach

Location
- Country: Germany
- State: Baden-Württemberg

Physical characteristics
- Mouth
  - location: Starzel
  - coordinates: 48.3711°N 8.9169°E

Basin features
- Progression: Starzel→ Neckar→ Rhine→ North Sea

Zimmerbach is a river of Baden-Württemberg, Germany. It is a left tributary of the Starzel near Rangendingen.

== See also ==
- List of rivers of Baden-Württemberg
