= Obernau (Rottenburg) =

- Part of Rottenburg am Neckar
- Coat of arms
- Interactive map of Obernau
- Location within Germany Location within Baden-Württemberg
- Coordinates: 48°27′29″N 08°52′12″E
- Country: Germany
- State: Baden-Württemberg
- Admin. region: Tübingen
- District: Tübingen
- Town: Rottenburg am Neckar

Government
  - Mayor: Horst Schröder

Area
  - Total: 3.78 km^{2} (1.46 sq mi)
- Elevation: 351–498 m (1,152–1,634 ft)

Population (2018)
  - Total: 508
  - Density: 134/km^{2} (348/sq mi)
- Time zone: UTC+01:00 (CET)
  - Summer (DST): UTC+02:00 (CEST)
- Postal codes: 72108
- Dialling codes: (+49) 07472
- Vehicle registration: TÜ
- Website: www.rottenburg.de

Obernau is a suburban district of Rottenburg am Neckar in the administrative district of Tübingen in Baden-Württemberg (Germany).

== Geography ==
Obernau is located 6 km (4.35 mi) western from Rottenburg am Neckar in the Neckar valley. The elevation of the territory is 351 to 498 m.

=== Extent ===
The area of the district is 378 hectares. Thereof fall 54.2% upon agriculturally used area, 34.7% upon forest area, 7.9% upon settlement area and roads, 1.9% upon water expanse and 1.3% upon other.

=== Neighbour localities ===
The territories of the following villages adjoin to Obernau, they are called clockwise beginning in the north: Nellingsheim, Bad Niedernau, Schwalldorf and Bieringen. (All villages are in the admin. district of Tübingen).

== Population ==
Obernau has a population of 503 people (31/01/08) and is therefore the second smallest district of Rottenburg. At an area of 3.78 km² (2.2 sq mi) this corresponds to a population density of 133 people per km², or 345 per sq mi.

=== Faiths ===
The population of the village is predominantly Roman Catholic.
