= Starzel =

Starzel may refer to:

- Starzel (Neckar), a river of Baden-Württemberg, Germany, tributary of the Neckar
- Starzel (Prim), a river of Baden-Württemberg, Germany, tributary of the Prim
