= Starzel (Neckar) =

River in Germany

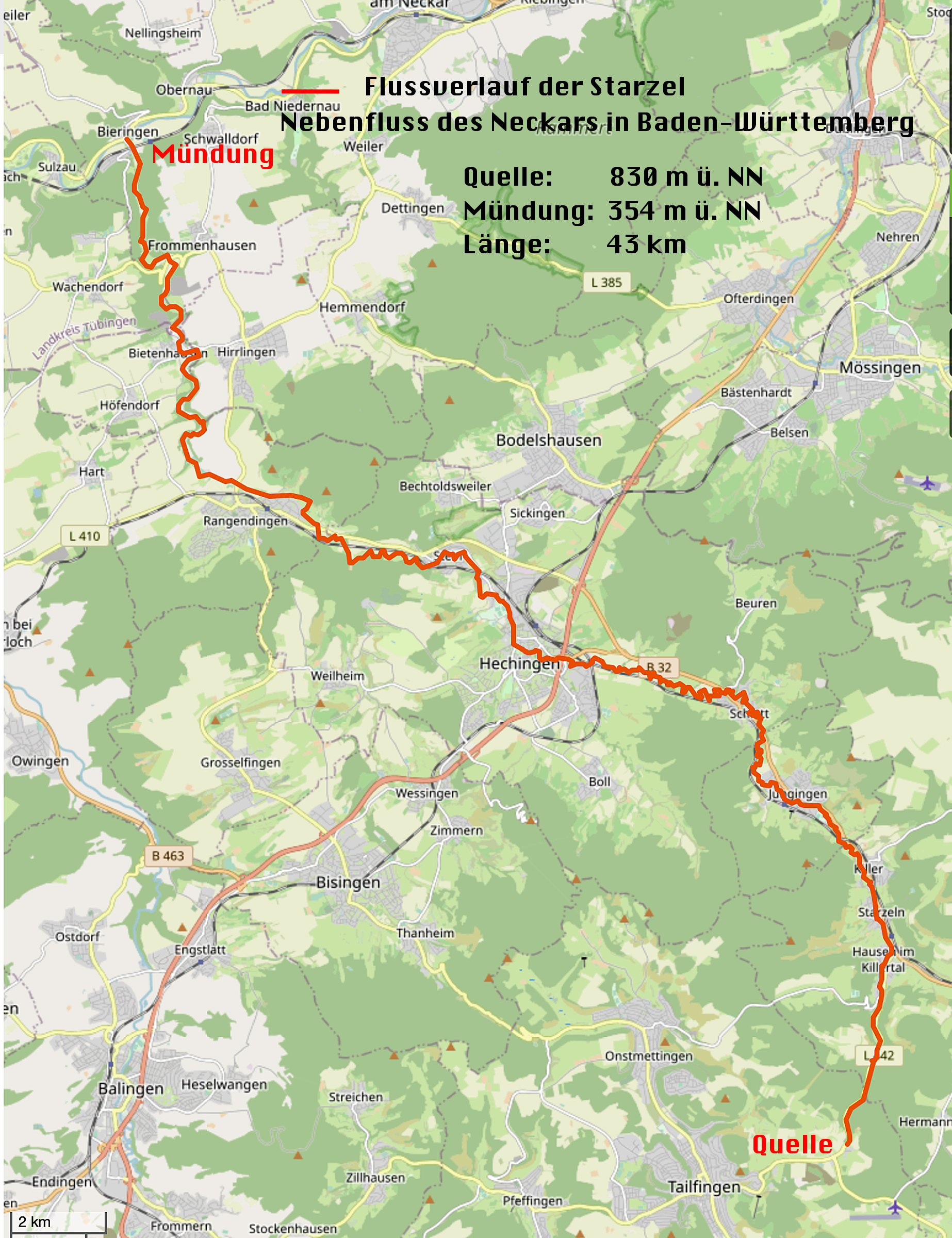

Location
- Country: Germany
- State: Baden-Württemberg

Physical characteristics
- Source
  - elevation: 830 m above sea level
- Mouth
  - location: Neckar
  - coordinates: 48.4492°N 8.8547°E
  - elevation: 354 m
- Length: 42.8 km (26.6 mi)

Basin features
- Progression: Neckar→ Rhine→ North Sea

Starzel is a river of Baden-Württemberg, Germany. It is a right tributary of the Neckar west of Rottenburg am Neckar.

== Geography ==
=== Course ===
Starzel is being built directly at Albtrauf at the European watershed, about three kilometres south of Hausen im Killertal (a district of Burladingen), a few dozen meters north of the hamlet Neuweiler, which belongs to Albstadt.

For historical reasons, the valley created by the Starzel, about 14 kilometres long on the northern edge of the Swabian Alb from its source to Hechingen is called Killer Valley. It is named after the village Killer, whose parish was responsible for the whole valley. The name Killer is historically composed of church and hamlet.

Near Hechingen the Starzel is fed on the left side by the Reichenbach. It now flows more to the west and is then at Stauffenburger Hof again strengthened from the left side by its longest tributary, the Zimmerbach.

After the passage of Rangendingen it turns to the north and finally flows into Bieringen at a height of 354 m above sea level, from the right into the Neckar.

=== Tributaries ===
- Neubrunnen (right), 1,9 km
- Scharlenbach (left), 3,5 km and 6,5 km^{2}
- Goosbach (left), 0,7 km
- Lindenbach (right), 1,9 km
- Buhenbach (right), 1,9 km
- Hirschbach (right), 1,1 km
- Sulzgraben (right), 0,8 km
- Mühlbachle (right), 1,8 km
- Bernerbächle (left), 2,3 km
- Lotterbächle (left), 1,4 km
- Weilerbächle (right), 1,0 km
- Buchbächle (right), 1,2 km
- Wettbächle (right), 1,1 km
- Heiligenbach (right), 3,7 km and 5,7 km^{2}
- Münchbach (right), 2,4
- Reichenbach (left), 9,5 km and 19,4 km^{2}
- Feilbach (left), 1,6 km
- Bräunestall (left), 1,3 km
- Sulzbach (left), 2,0 km
- Ettenbach (right), 4,5 km and 5,5 km^{2}
- Winterhaldenbach (right), 3,0 km and 1,9 km^{2}
- Tufelbach (left), 2,0 km
- Zimmerbach (left), 12,1 km and 25,4 km^{2}
- Ramsbach (right), 2,2 km
- Mönchgraben (right), 1,9 km
- Talbach (left), 6,1 km and 9,7 km^{2}
- Sendelgraben (left), 3,4 km and 1,4 km^{2}
- Bruckbach (left), 3,6 km and 6.1 km^{2}
- Omengraben (left), 4,2 km and 3,5 km^{2}
- Ganggraben (right), 2,4 km and 5,1 km^{2}
- Tobelsgraben (left), 2,5 km and 9,8 km^{2}
- Haldengraben (right), 0,6 km

=== Settlements ===
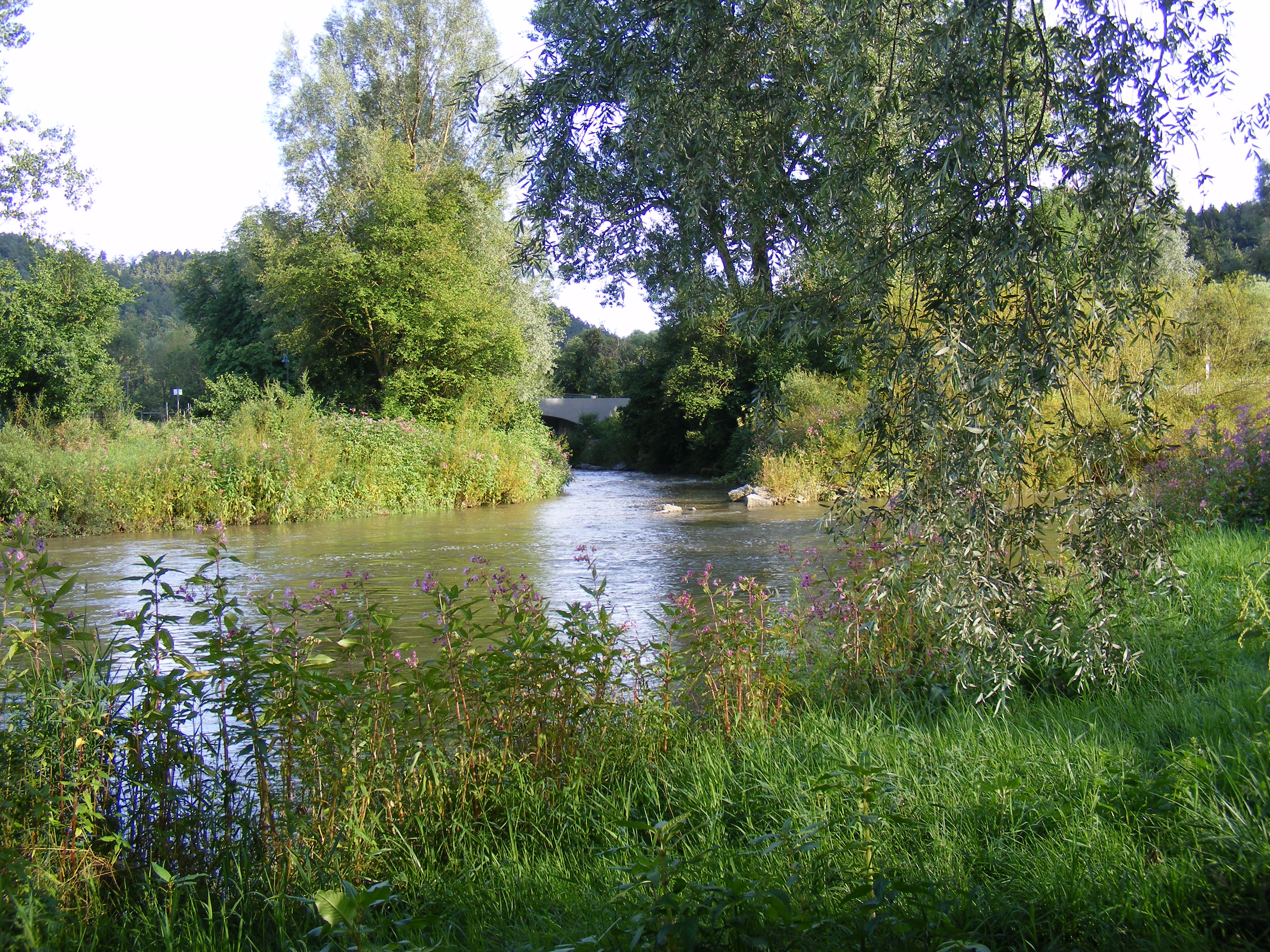
The Starzel flows into the Neckar in Bieringen

On its approximately 41 kilometre long way to the north-west the Starzel crosses or passes through the following towns and villages:

- Hausen im Killertal (Burladingen)
- Starzeln (Burladingen)
- Killer (Burladingen)
- Jungingen
- Schlatt (Hechingen)
- Hechingen
- Stein (Hechingen)
- Rangendingen
- Hirrlingen
- Bietenhausen (Rangendingen)
- Bieringen (Rottenburg)

In the village of Bieringen (district of Rottenburg) the Starzel river flows into the Neckar.

== Geology and geomorphology ==
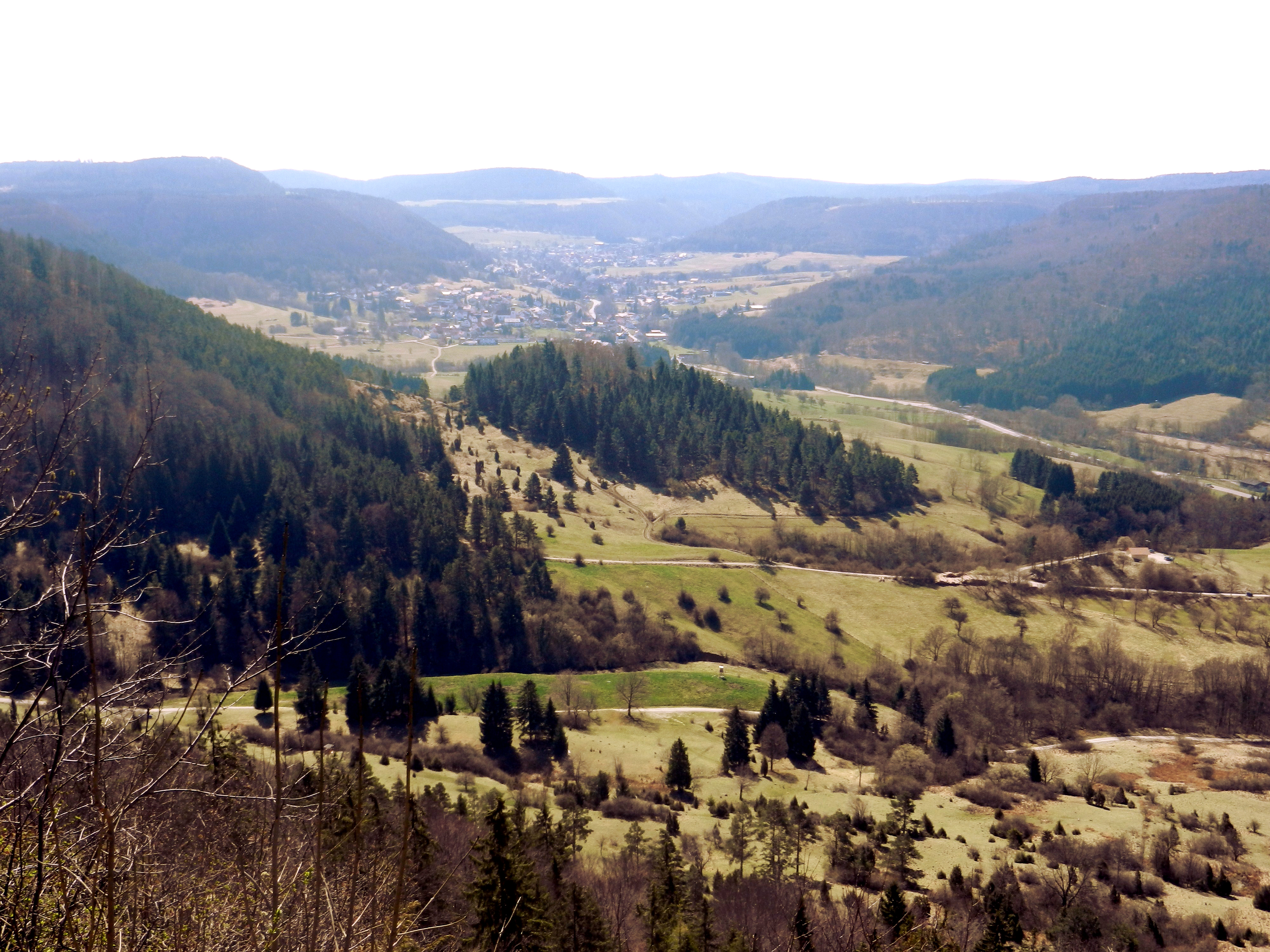
The valley of the Starzel, called "Killertal" in its upper course (view up the valley). From the front the villages Killer, Starzeln and Hausen im Killertal, all districts of Burladingen.

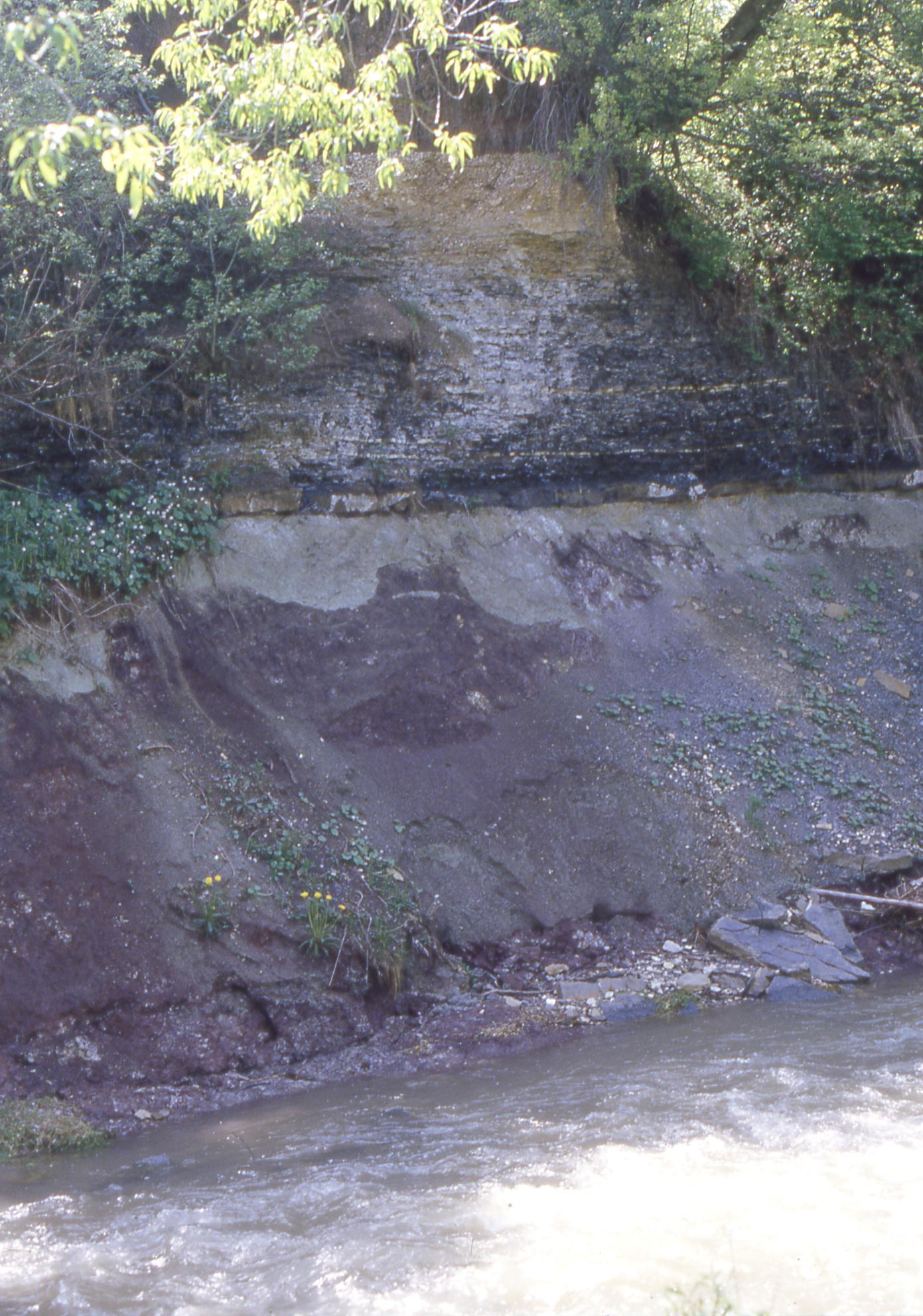
Cut bank

near Hechingen-Stein with border outcrop between Jura and Keuper

From the White Jurassic to the Muschelkalk the Starzel passes through all layers of the Jurassic and about two thirds of the Triassic. Its valley was formed by retrograde Erosion, in that the stream from the northwest cut deeper and deeper into the strata of the Swabian Alb and its foreland. The valley of the Starzel river intervenes eleven kilometres into the plateau of the Swabian Alb and is bordered in the west by the 957 high Raichberg and in the east by the up to 840 meter high hayfield. It begins with the source area of the Starzel and its tributaries at the watershed between the river system of the Rhine and that of the Danube. A special feature are the so-called waterfall layers, a hard sandstone, which is bedded over leafy shale clays. Between Jungingen and Schlatt the Starzel has formed an eight meter high waterfall, the Junginger Gieß. For long stretches it moves in a near-natural stream bed. Between Jungingen and Hechingen it has deepened like a canyon.

== Starzel flood 2008 ==
In the evening of 2 June 2008, a thunderstorm caused heavy rainfall and flooding, as a result of which three women drowned, two in Jungingen and one in Hechingen. The "Killer valley" made international headlines like this. Around 3.4 million euros have been paid out to those affected to repair the material damage (1.5 million from donations, 1.8 million from the state of Baden-Württemberg). Thus, the entire notified need has been covered.

As a result of the disaster, the Zweckverband Hochwasserschutz Starzeltal was founded in 2013.

== See also ==
- List of rivers of Baden-Württemberg
