= Jungingen =

- Municipality
- Coat of arms

- Location of Jungingen within Zollernalbkreis district
- Interactive map of Jungingen
- Location within Germany Location within Baden-Württemberg
- Coordinates: 48°19′44″N 09°02′33″E
- Country: Germany
- State: Baden-Württemberg
- Admin. region: Tübingen
- District: Zollernalbkreis

Government
  - Mayor (2020–28): Oliver Simmendinger

Area
  - Total: 9.33 km^{2} (3.60 sq mi)
- Elevation: 590 m (1,940 ft)

Population (2025-12-31)
  - Total: 1,414
  - Density: 152/km^{2} (393/sq mi)
- Time zone: UTC+01:00 (CET)
  - Summer (DST): UTC+02:00 (CEST)
- Postal codes: 72417
- Dialling codes: 07477
- Vehicle registration: BL
- Website: www.jungingen.de

Jungingen (German pronunciation: [ˈjʊŋɪŋən]) is a municipality in the Zollernalbkreis, Baden-Württemberg, Germany. It is located nearby the castle Burg Hohenzollern, about 5 km east of Hechingen.

In former times, the city was located in Hohenzollern-Hechingen, a principality of the House of Hohenzollern, and a fiefdom of Swabian counts.

== Geography ==
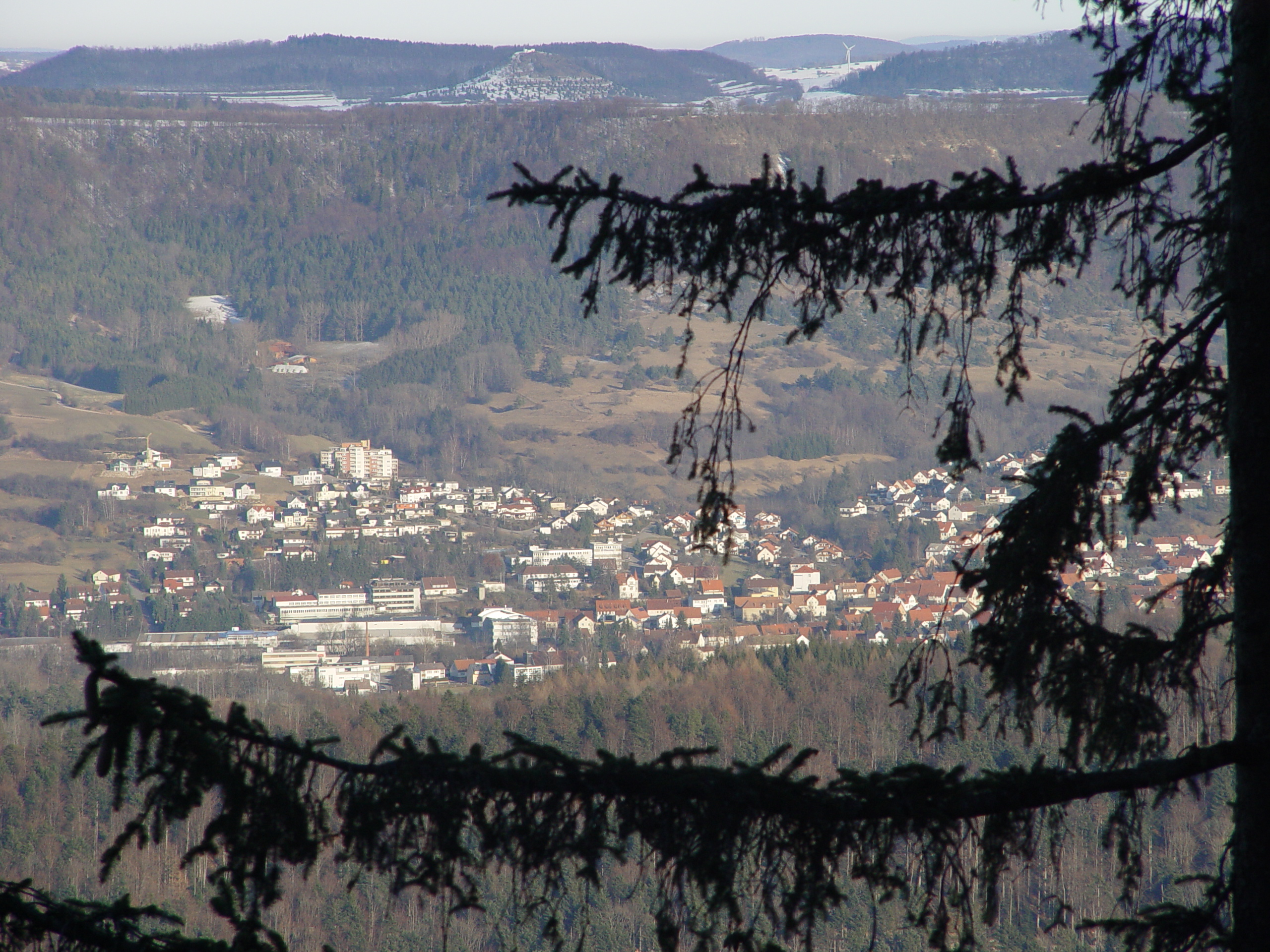
Jungingen and the Kornbühl from Raichberg

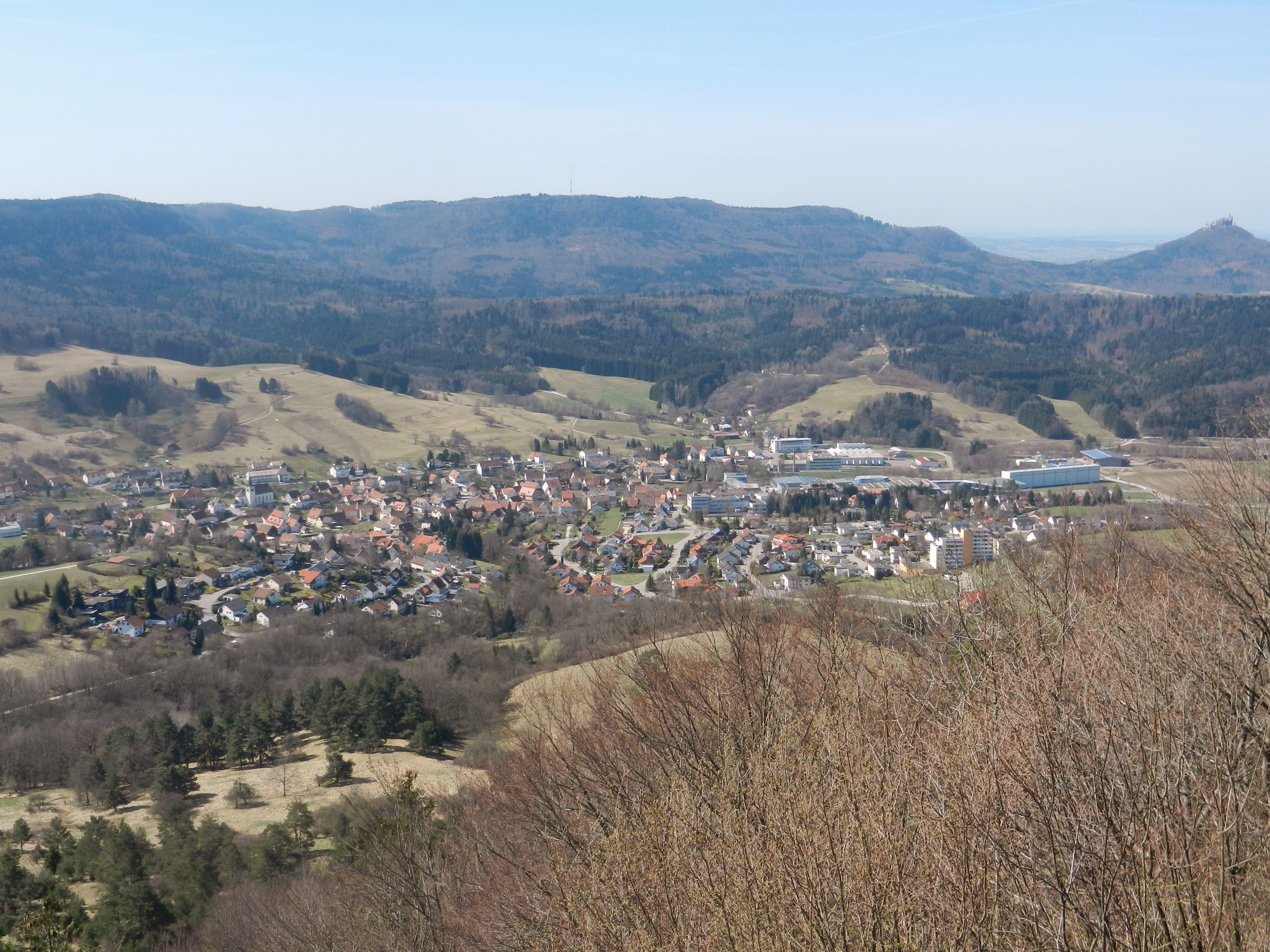
Jungingen with Hohenzollern Castle

Jungingen is located in the valley of the Starzel, a tributary of the Neckar.

=== Adjacent municipalities ===
The following towns and municipalities border on Jungingen, clockwise from the north (all part of the Zollernalbkreis):

Hechingen, Burladingen and Albstadt.

== History ==
Jungingen was probably founded in the 4th century by Alemanni, named after a leader called "Jungo".

The village was first documented in 1075.

The local castle was located on a hill called "Bürgle". In 1278 it was transferred to the Order of St. John, and around 1300 to the Duke of Württemberg. In 1311, it was destroyed in the Towns war, by Reutlingen, which also burned down the village.

The most famous people from Jungingen were two brothers who became Grandmaster of the Teutonic Order during the Baltic Crusades, Konrad von Jungingen and Ulrich von Jungingen.

Under Konrad, the Monastic State of the Teutonic Knights in Prussia was at the peak of its power (1393–1407) after an invasion force under Konrad conquered the island of Gotland in 1398, destroyed Visby, and drove the Victual Brothers out of Gotland and the Baltic Sea.

Ulrich died 1410 in the Battle of Grunwald.
