= Eugen Steimle =

German SS officer, Holocaust perpetrator (1909–1987)

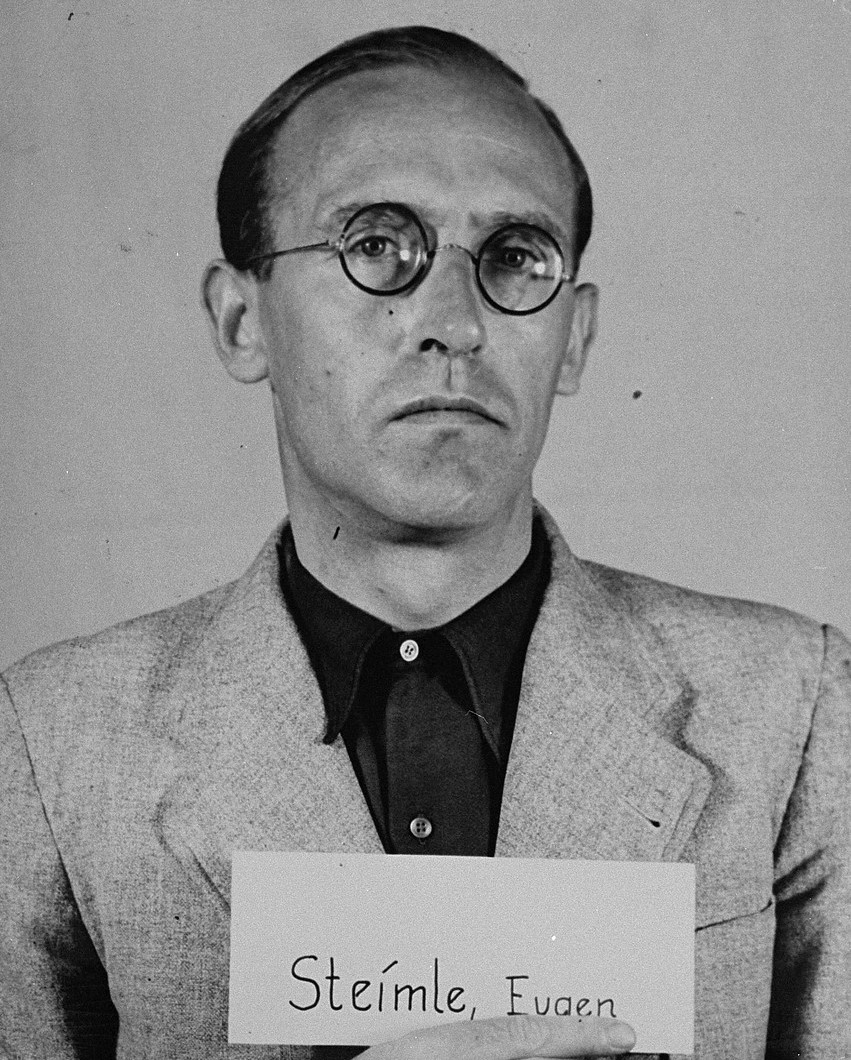
- Steimle's mugshot after his indictment for the Nuremberg Military Tribunal (July 1947)
- Born: 8 December 1909; Neubulach, German Empire
- Died: 6 October 1987 (aged 77); Ravensburg, West Germany
- Military career
- Allegiance: Nazi Germany
- Branch: Schutzstaffel
- Service years: 1932–1945
- Rank: Standartenführer
- Units: Einsatzgruppe B Einsatzgruppe C
- Commands: Sonderkommando 7a Einsatzkommando 4a

Eugen Steimle (8 December 1909 – 6 October 1987) was a German SS commander in the Sicherheitsdienst (SD) during the Nazi era. He commanded SS-Sonderkommando 7a and Einsatzkommando 4a of the Einsatzgruppen, both of which were responsible for mass killings in the Soviet Union. Steimle was found guilty in 1947 in the Einsatzgruppen Trial and sentenced to death in 1948. His sentence was commuted to 20 years in prison.

== SS career ==
Steimle was the son of a pastor and came from a strict pietistic family and studied history, German and French at the University of Tübingen and University of Berlin. In May 1935, he passed his teaching exams. He joined the Nazi Party in 1932 and the National Socialist German Students' League (NSDStB), where he devoted himself to teaching Volksdeutsche students of the Sudetenland. He joined the SS (no. 272,575) as well in 1932, and then joined the SD in 1935 at the instigation of NSDStB chief Gustav Adolf Scheel. In September 1936, Steimle directed the SD office in Stuttgart. First, he headed the SD subsection Württemberg, and from 1939 until 1943, the SD-Leitabschnitt Stuttgart.

From 7 September to 10 December 1941, he succeeded Walter Blume as the commanding officer of SS-Sonderkommando 7a in Einsatzgruppe B, which was led by Arthur Nebe. Under Steimle's command, his unit murdered 500 Jews within two months. From August 1942 to January 1943, he replaced Erwin Weinmann as leader of Einsatzkommando 4a in Einsatzgruppe C, which was led by Otto Rasch. After returning to Germany, he became head of Group VI B (German-Italian sphere of influence in Europe, Africa and the Middle East) in the RSHA. In 1944, he was promoted to SS-Standartenführer.

== Trial and conviction ==
Steimle was arrested by the Allies in 1945. He was found guilty in 1947 in the Einsatzgruppen Trial and sentenced to death in 1948. His sentence was commuted to 20 years in prison based upon recommendations of the "Peck Panel". He was released from Landsberg Prison in June 1954 and then taught German and history in Wilhelmsdorf, Baden-Württemberg. He retired in 1975. Eugen Steimle died on 6 October 1987.
