= Frommenhausen =

- Part of Rottenburg am Neckar
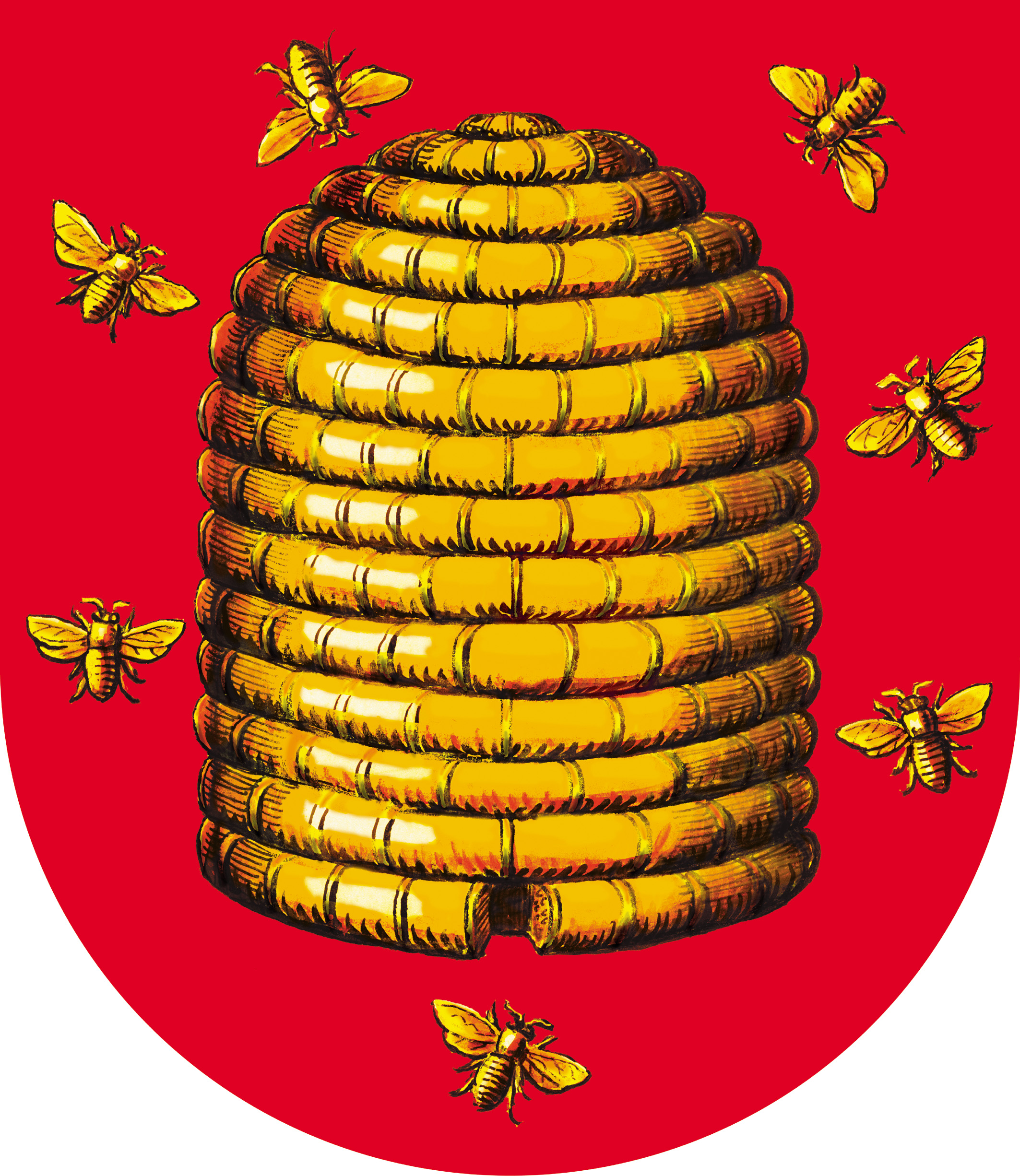
- Coat of arms
- Interactive map of Frommenhausen
- Location within Germany Location within Baden-Württemberg
- Coordinates: 48°25′50″N 08°52′27″E
- Country: Germany
- State: Baden-Württemberg
- Admin. region: Tübingen
- District: Tübingen
- Town: Rottenburg am Neckar

Government
  - Mayor: Kurt Hallmayer

Area
  - Total: 3.62 km^{2} (1.40 sq mi)
- Elevation: 369–493 m (1,211–1,617 ft)

Population (2018)
  - Total: 482
  - Density: 133/km^{2} (345/sq mi)
- Time zone: UTC+01:00 (CET)
  - Summer (DST): UTC+02:00 (CEST)
- Postal codes: 72108
- Dialling codes: (+49) 07472
- Vehicle registration: TÜ
- Website: www.rottenburg.de

Frommenhausen is a suburban district of Rottenburg am Neckar in the administrative district of Tübingen in Baden-Württemberg (Germany).

== Geography ==
Frommenhausen is located 9 km (5.59 mi) southwestern from Rottenburg am Neckar on the Gäu-Plateau with an elevation from 369 to 493 m.

=== Extent ===
The area of the district is 362 hectares. Thereof fall 73.4% upon agriculturally used area, 14.7% upon forest area, 9.4% upon settlement area and roads, and 1.9% upon other.

=== Neighbour localities ===
The territories of the following villages adjoin to Frommenhausen, they are called clockwise beginning in the north: Schwalldorf, Hirrlingen and Wachendorf. All villages are in the admin. district of Tübingen.

== Population ==
The village has a population of 467 people(31/01/08). So it is the smallest district of Rottenburg. At an area of 3.62 km^{2} (2.2 sq mi) this corresponds to a population density of 129 people per km^{2}, or 334 per sq mi.

=== Faiths ===
Most of the population is Roman Catholic.
