= Walter Blume (SS officer) =

Einsatzgruppen SS officer and Holocaust perpetrator

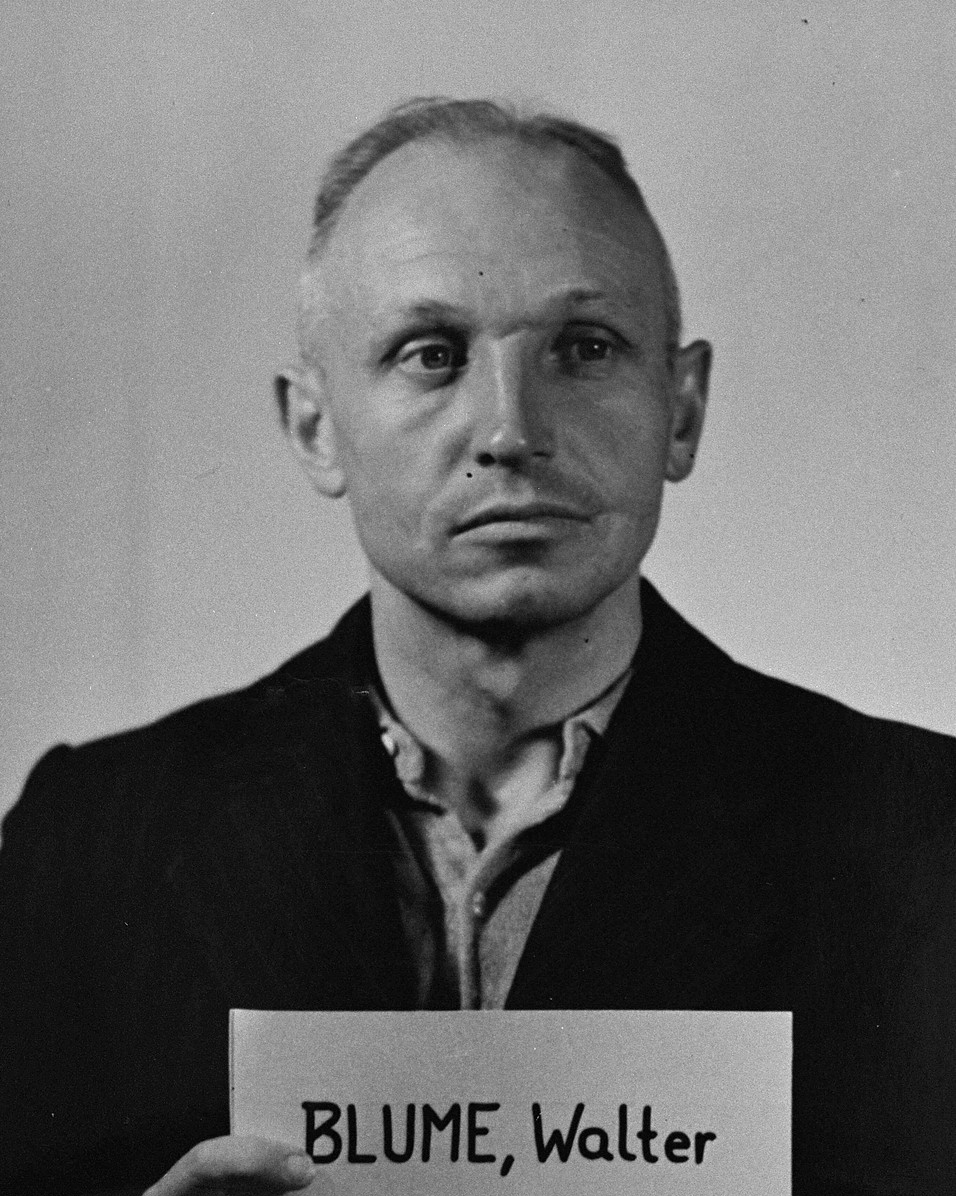
- Blume's mugshot after his indictment for the Nuremberg Military Tribunal (July 1947)
- Born: 23 July 1906; Dortmund, German Empire
- Died: 13 November 1974 (aged 68); Dortmund, West Germany
- Military career
- Allegiance: Nazi Germany
- Branch: Schutzstaffel
- Service years: 1935–1945
- Rank: SS-Standartenführer
- Unit: Einsatzgruppe B
- Commands: Sonderkommando 7a Commander of SiPo and SD, Greece
- Conflicts: World War II
- Awards: Iron Cross, 2nd class War Merit Cross

Walter Blume (23 July 1906 – 13 November 1974) was a mid-ranking SS commander and the leader of SS-Sonderkommando 7a, part of the extermination commando group Einsatzgruppe B. The unit perpetrated the killings of thousands of Jews in Belarus and Russia. Blume was also responsible for helping organize the deportation of over 46,000 Greek Jews to Auschwitz. Although imprisoned in 1945 and sentenced to death for war crimes in 1948, his sentence was commuted to life imprisonment in 1951 by the "Peck Panel" and he was released in 1955.

== Early life ==
Blume was born into a Protestant family in Dortmund, Germany. His father was a schoolteacher and held a doctorate in law. Walter also studied law at the Universities of Bonn, Jena, and the University of Münster, passing the bar examination and receiving his doctorate in law from the University of Erlangen in April 1933. He was hired as a police inspector in his hometown of Dortmund on 1 March 1933, serving under Wilhelm Schepmann, and joined the SA and Nazi Party (member 3,282,505) on 1 May 1933. In 1934 he was transferred to the Prussian Secret State Police Office, where he also worked for the SD. He was registered on 11 April 1935 in the ranks of the SS (member 267,224), later joining the staff of the Reich Security Main Office (RSHA).

Gaining the attention of his superiors, he served in the State Police Offices of Halle, Hanover and, in December 1939, he was appointed the Gestapo chief in Berlin.

== Gestapo career ==
In March 1941, Blume was made chief of the RSHA personnel department. He was called to Düben where he was given responsibility for collecting, reorganizing and selecting personnel for the components of the Einsatzgruppen squads. In May he assumed the leadership of SS-Sonderkommando 7a attached to Einsatzgruppe B (under Arthur Nebe) assigned to the 9th Army, part of Operation Barbarossa which started on 22 June 1941.

Blume had been personally informed by Reinhard Heydrich that he and the 91 men under his command had a single task: the Judenvernichtungsbefehl (order to exterminate the Jews). Heydrich made it clear that this was on Hitler's orders.

=== Activities in Belarus and Russia ===
Blume and his squad ravaged the region of Belarus (Vitebsk), and parts of western Russia (Klintsy, Nevel, Smolensk) killing 1,517 Jews by September 1941 of which Blume personally took a careful record. On 26 July 1941, Blume participated in the killing of 27 Jews who, not having reported for work, were shot down in the streets. Blume himself shot an unspecified number of victims at point-blank range with his pistol. Blume also prepared the extermination contingent for operation in Moscow when it was conquered, which ultimately did not occur.

Later during his affidavits, Blume stated:

I carried out one [particular] execution in the course of my duty. I remember one occasion on which between 70 and 80 people were executed in Vitebsk and on another occasion on which a similar number were executed in Minsk... on both occasions a kind of trench was dug, the persons destined to die were placed in front of it and shot with carbines. About 10 people were shot simultaneously by an execution force of 30 to 40 men. There was no doctor present at the execution, but the leader of the execution force who was responsible made sure that the people were dead. Coups de grace were not necessary.

Although Blume insisted at the trial that the Führer's orders filled him with revulsion, he was reported to have announced to the firing squad after each shooting,

It is no job for German men and soldiers to shoot defenseless people, but the Führer has ordered these shootings because he is convinced that these men otherwise would shoot at us as partisans or would shoot at our comrades, and our women and children were also to be protected if we undertake these executions. This we would have to remember when we carried out this order.

Blume only stayed in command of Sonderkommando 7a until 17 August 1941 and was succeeded in this post by Eugen Steimle. It appears that he was recalled to Berlin due to his reluctance to shoot women and children, which led him to acquire a reputation among his fellow SS officers for being "weak and bureaucratic". He was promoted to SS-Standartenführer and was named as the Inspecteur der Sicherheitspolizei und des SD in Düsseldorf where he spent the next two years. He was also named an Oberregierungsrat (senior government councilor).

=== Activities in Greece ===
In August 1943, Blume was assigned as Befehlshaber der Sicherheitspolizei und des SD (Commander of the SiPo and SD) in occupied Greece. Between October 1943 and September 1944, Blume managed, under the direction of Adolf Eichmann, the deportation of over 46,000 Greek Jews to Auschwitz Concentration Camp, the majority of them from Salonika, along with approximately 3,000 from Rhodes, Kos, Athens, Ioannina, and Corfu. Blume rewarded his subordinates, including Hauptsturmführer Anton Burger, with gold coins, jewellery and fine clothes stolen from the victims of deportation.

In mid-1944, Blume gained some notoriety among his Nazi colleagues for proposing the "Chaos Thesis", arguing that if the Germans were forced to leave occupied territories, they should blow up factories, docks and other installations; they should also arrest and execute the entire political leadership of Greece, leaving the country in a state of anarchy. Blume also proposed sending the entire able-bodied male population of Athens to forced labor in Germany, to prevent them from joining the andartes. Hermann Neubacher at the German Foreign Office did not receive this suggestion favorably, however Blume proceeded with plans to arrest Greek politicians and send them to Haidari concentration camp. On 4 September 1944, Neubacher ordered Blume to cease his "chaos operations", and on 7 September Ernst Kaltenbrunner ordered Blume to leave Greece. When the Nazis left Greece in September 1944, the country was considered Judenfrei ("free of Jews"), and Blume returned to RSHA headquarters in Berlin.

== Nuremberg conviction ==
In 1945, Blume was captured in Salzburg by the Americans and brought to Landsberg Prison. He was tried at the Einsatzgruppen Trial for his crimes, including crimes against humanity, war crimes and membership of three criminal organizations, the SS, SD and Gestapo. The indictment specified Blume's direct responsibility for the murder of 996 people between June and August 1941.

Concerning his motivation for helping to perpetrate the Holocaust, Blume said that he admired, adored, and worshipped Hitler because Hitler was successful not only in the domestic rehabilitation of Germany, as Blume interpreted it, but successful in defeating Poland, France, Belgium, Belarus, Bulgaria, the Netherlands, Norway, Yugoslavia, Greece, Luxembourg, Lithuania, Russia, and other countries. To Blume these successes were evidence of great virtue in Hitler. Blume believed that Adolf Hitler "had a great mission for the German people."

Dr. Günther Lummert, Blume's lawyer, collected affidavits on Blume's character describing Blume's honesty, good nature, kindness, tolerance, and sense of justness. The Tribunal expressed "regret that a person of such excellent moral qualities should have fallen under the influence of Adolf Hitler."

On 10 April 1948, Blume was sentenced to death by hanging, but his sentence was commuted to 25 years in a 1951 amnesty hearing, based on the "Peck Panel" recommendation. Blume was released from prison in 1955 after serving only ten years of his sentence.

== Second trial ==
After 1957 Blume worked as a businessman in the Ruhr Valley. He remarried in 1958 and had six children (including two by adoption).

In 1968, Blume was arrested and re-tried by a state court in Bremen, together with his subordinate Obersturmführer Friedrich Linnemann, for charges related to the deportation of Jews in Greece. In spite of considerable evidence against him, all charges were dropped on 29 January 1971. Blume was released from custody, and died in 1974 at the age of 68.

In 1997 a cache of luxury watches, rings, gold bars and gold teeth worth approximately $4 million, together with identity documents and Gestapo promotions belonging to Colonel Walter Blume were uncovered in Brazil in the possession of a family member, pawnbroker Albert Blume.

== Other quotes ==
If I am now asked about my inner attitude which I then held, I can only say that it was absolutely split. On the one hand there was the strict order of my superior... and as a soldier I had to obey. On the other hand I considered the execution of this order cruel and humanly impossible. My very presence at this execution convinced me of this in a final manner. I still know that I wanted to make the situation easier for my men who were certainly moved by the same feelings. When ten men were shot there was always a pause until the next had been brought in. During these pauses I let my men sit down and rest and I joined them. I still know that I said exactly the following words to them at the time: "As such it is no job for German men and soldiers to shoot defenseless people but the Führer has ordered these shootings because he is convinced that these men otherwise would shoot at us as partisans or would shoot at our comrades and our women and children were also to be protected if we undertake these executions. This we would have to remember when we carry out this order." Furthermore, I tried by talking about neutral subjects to make the difficult situation easier and to overcome it.
