= Bad Niedernau =

- Part of Rottenburg am Neckar
- Coat of arms
- Interactive map of Bad Niedernau
- Location within Germany Location within Baden-Württemberg
- Coordinates: 48°27′27″N 08°54′02″E
- Country: Germany
- State: Baden-Württemberg
- Admin. region: Tübingen
- District: Tübingen
- Town: Rottenburg am Neckar

Area
  - Total: 4.10 km^{2} (1.58 sq mi)
- Elevation: 475 m (1,558 ft)

Population (2018)
  - Total: 524
  - Density: 128/km^{2} (331/sq mi)
- Time zone: UTC+01:00 (CET)
  - Summer (DST): UTC+02:00 (CEST)
- Postal codes: 72108
- Dialling codes: (+49) 07472
- Vehicle registration: TÜ
- Website: www.rottenburg.de

Bad Niedernau is a suburban district of Rottenburg am Neckar in the administrative district of Tübingen in Baden-Württemberg (Germany).

== Geography ==
Bad Niedernau is located 3 km (1.86 mi) southwest of Rottenburg am Neckar in the Neckar-valley with an elevation from 430 to 475 m.

=== Extent ===
The area of the district is 410 hectares. 52.5% is agriculturally used area, 32.3% forest area, 7.7% settled area and roads, 5.3% water expanse, and 2.2% other.

=== Neighbour localities ===
The following territories adjoin to Bad Niedernau, clockwise beginning in the north they are: Rottenburg (town), Weiler, Schwalldorf and Obernau (all in the admin. district of Tübingen). Weiler, Schwalldorf and Obernau are districts of Rottenburg am Neckar.

== Population ==
Bad Niedernau has a current population of 569 people (31/01/08). In order to that Bad Niedernau is among the smaller districts of Rottenburg. The population density is 139 people per km² (359 per sq mi), according to an area of 4.10 km² (1.6 sq mi).

=== Faiths ===
The population of the village is predominantly Roman Catholic.

== Personalities ==
=== Honorary Citizens ===
The former municipality of Bad Niedernau has awarded the honorary citizenship to Kilian von Steiner (Banker) in 1891.
