= Starzach =

- Municipality
- Coat of arms

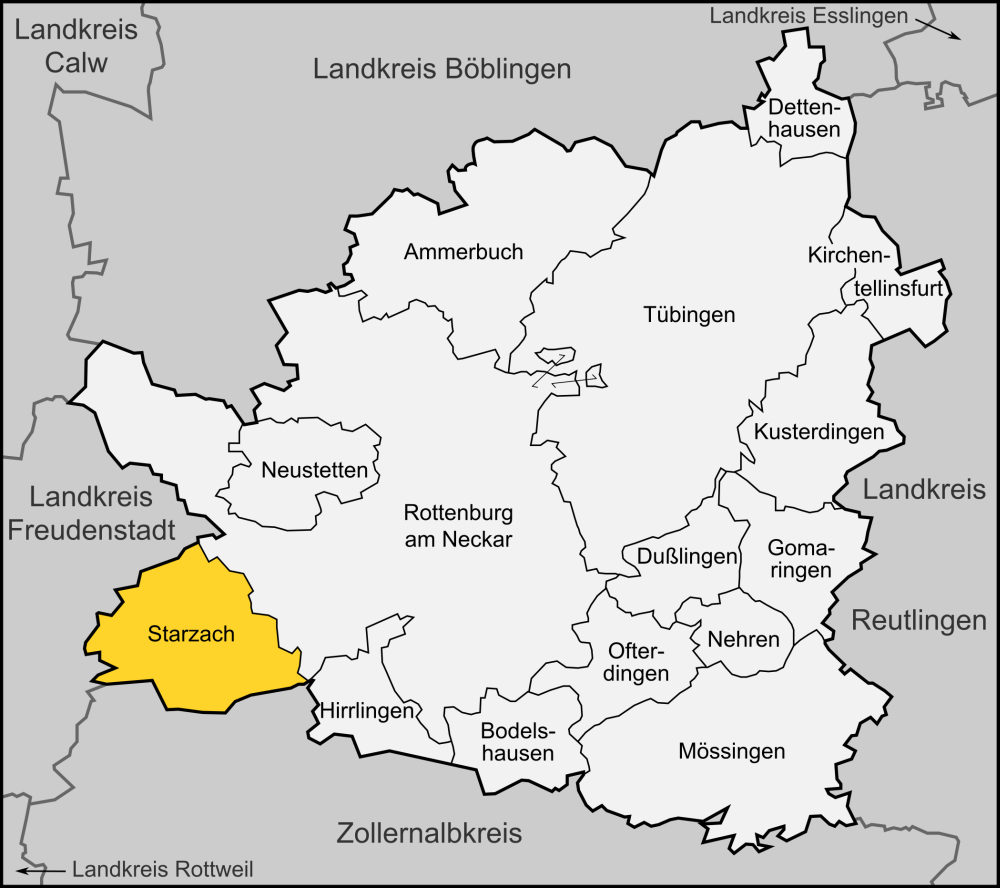
- Location of Starzach within Tübingen district
- Interactive map of Starzach
- Location within Germany Location within Baden-Württemberg
- Coordinates: 48°25′54″N 8°48′48″E
- Country: Germany
- State: Baden-Württemberg
- Admin. region: Tübingen
- District: Tübingen
- Subdivisions: 5 Ortsteile

Government
  - Mayor (2020–28): Thomas Noé

Area
  - Total: 27.84 km^{2} (10.75 sq mi)
- Elevation: 526 m (1,726 ft)

Population (2025-12-31)
  - Total: 4,340
  - Density: 156/km^{2} (404/sq mi)
- Time zone: UTC+01:00 (CET)
  - Summer (DST): UTC+02:00 (CEST)
- Postal codes: 72181
- Dialling codes: 07483, 07457, 07478, 07472
- Vehicle registration: TÜ
- Website: www.starzach.de

Starzach (German pronunciation: [ˈʃtaʁtsax]; Swabian: Schdarzach) is a municipality in the district of Tübingen in Baden-Württemberg in Germany. Starzach is located about 20 kilometers southwest from Tübingen.

== Geographical location ==
Starzach is located on the Neckar between Rottenburg am Neckar and Horb am Neckar. Two community members (Börstingen and Sulzau) are in the Neckar valley, three others (Felldorf, Bierlingen and Wachendorf) south above it. The two rivers Starzel (Neckar) and Eyach limit the municipality. Due to its scenic location Starzach is also called the Tuscany of the district Tübingen.

== Municipality arrangement ==
The community Starzach consists of the previously independent municipalities Bierlingen, Börstingen, Felldorf, Sulzau and Wachendorf. To the former municipality Bierlingen belongs the village Bierlingen and the farm Neuhaus. To former municipality Börstingen belongs the village Börstingen with the rest of the castle Siegburg and the houses Bahnhof Eyach, carbonic acid plant, Lohmühle (today according to Eyach) and Wilhelmshöhe.

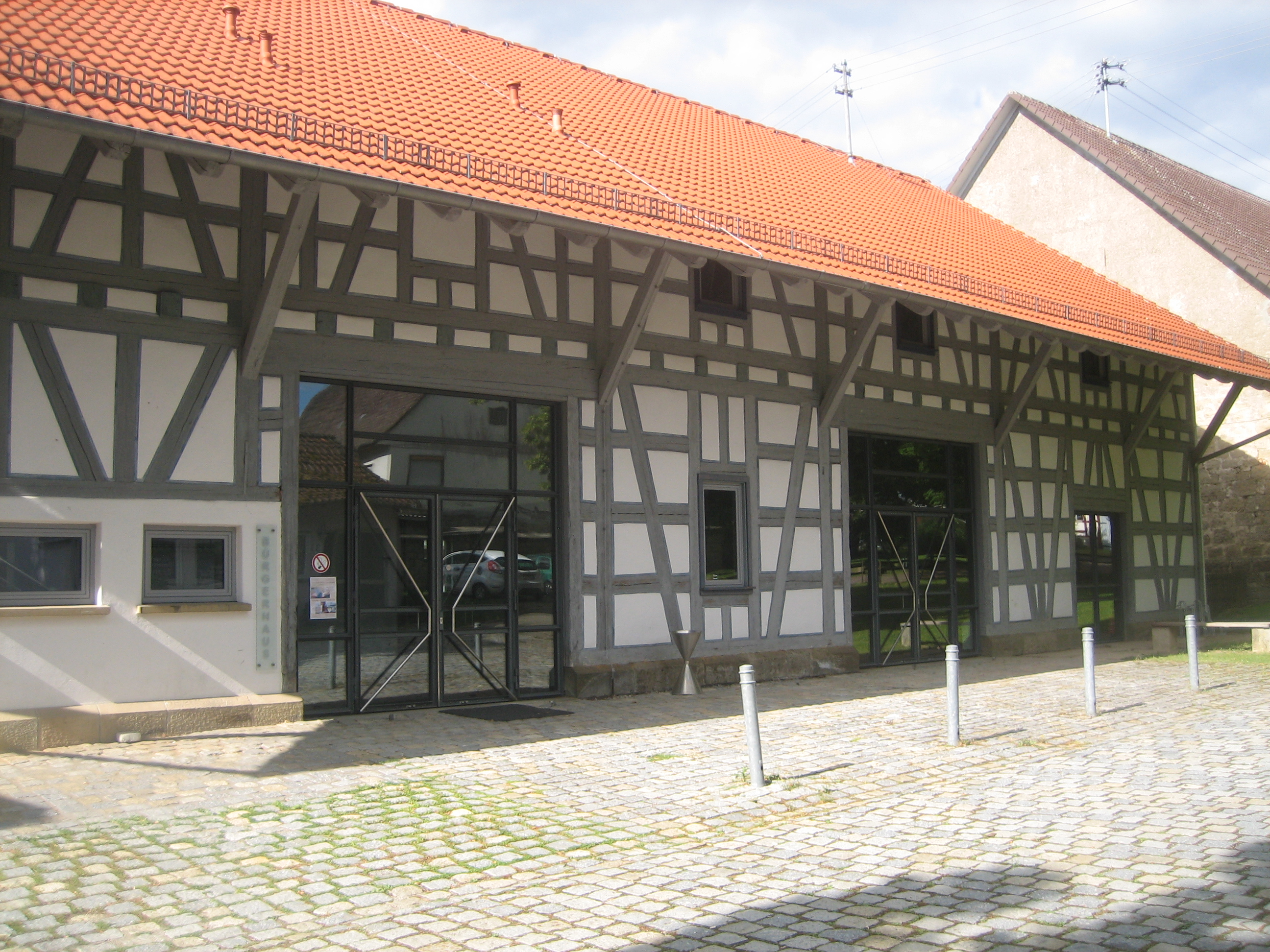
Felldorf Ortsteil von Starzach Kreis Tübingen Gemeindehaus

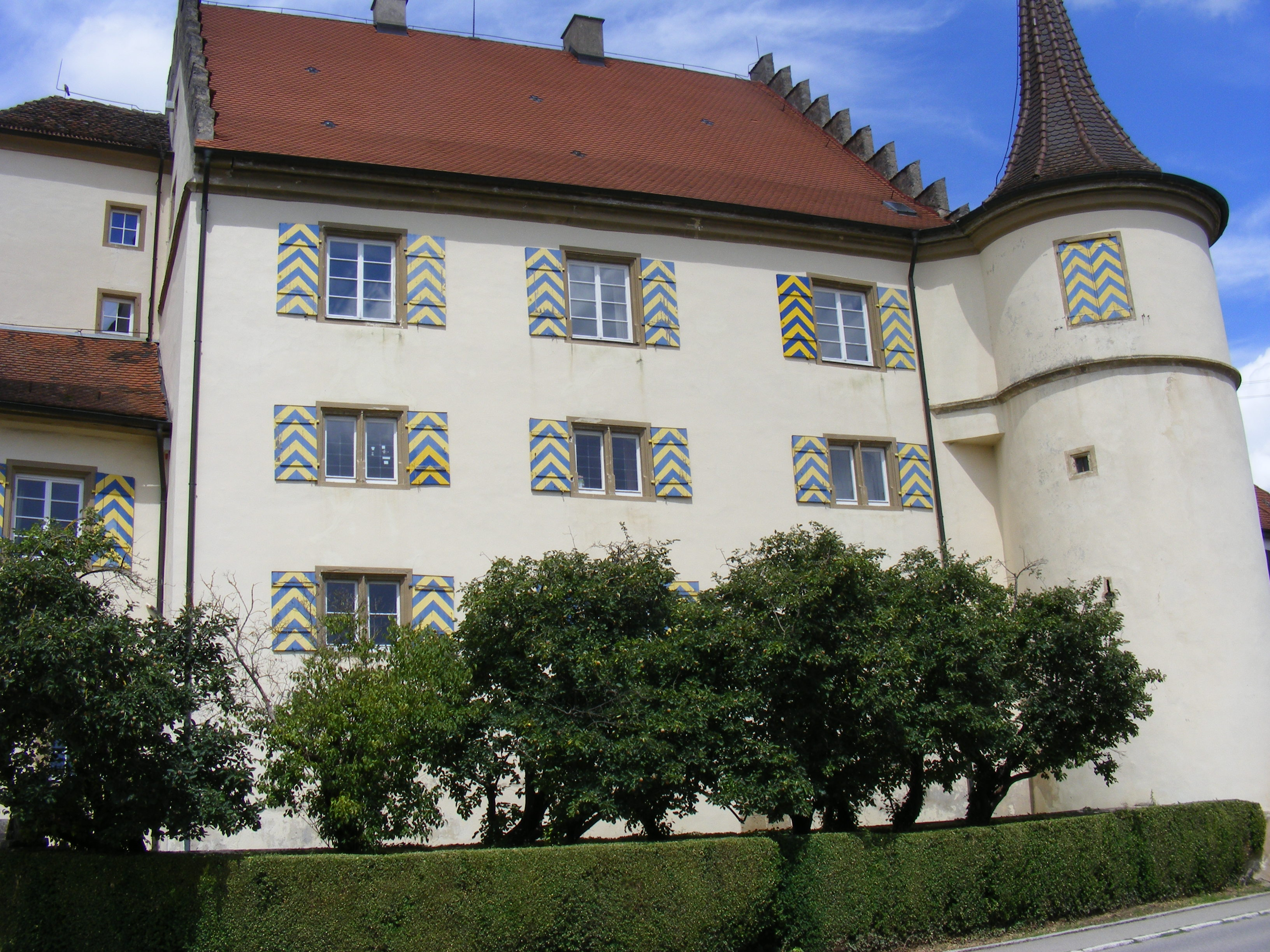
Starzach 001 Castle Wachendorf

To the territory of the former municipality Felldorf belonged the village Felldorf and the in the 1990s broken Honorsmühle. To the territory of the former municipality Sulzau belong the former village Sulzau and castle and farmstead Weitenburg. In territory of the former municipality Wachendorf are the village Wachendorf and the house Burgmühle. Probably in the 14th century was the village Hausen twitching in the former municipality Börstingen as well as in the former municipality Sulzau. In the southwest of the former municipality Felldorf was in 1747 mentioned as Karrenhausen village Kaltenhausen. Above the village Sulzau, located at the Neckar, are the proofs of former town Neumühle. In the south of the former municipality Wachendorf are the proofs of former village Bechhausen, suggesting a field name.

== History ==
The community Starzach was formed on 1 January 1972 from the three municipalities Bierlingen, Felldorf and Wachendorf. The name Starzach was derived from the two river Starzel and Eyach. On 1 June 1973, the smallest suburb Sulzau came to Starzach and on February 1, 1974 Börstingen completed by referendum the new community. The two rivers and five flowers - from the arms of Sulzau - for five villages are reflected in the municipal coat of arms. The seat of the municipality is located in the district Bierlingen.

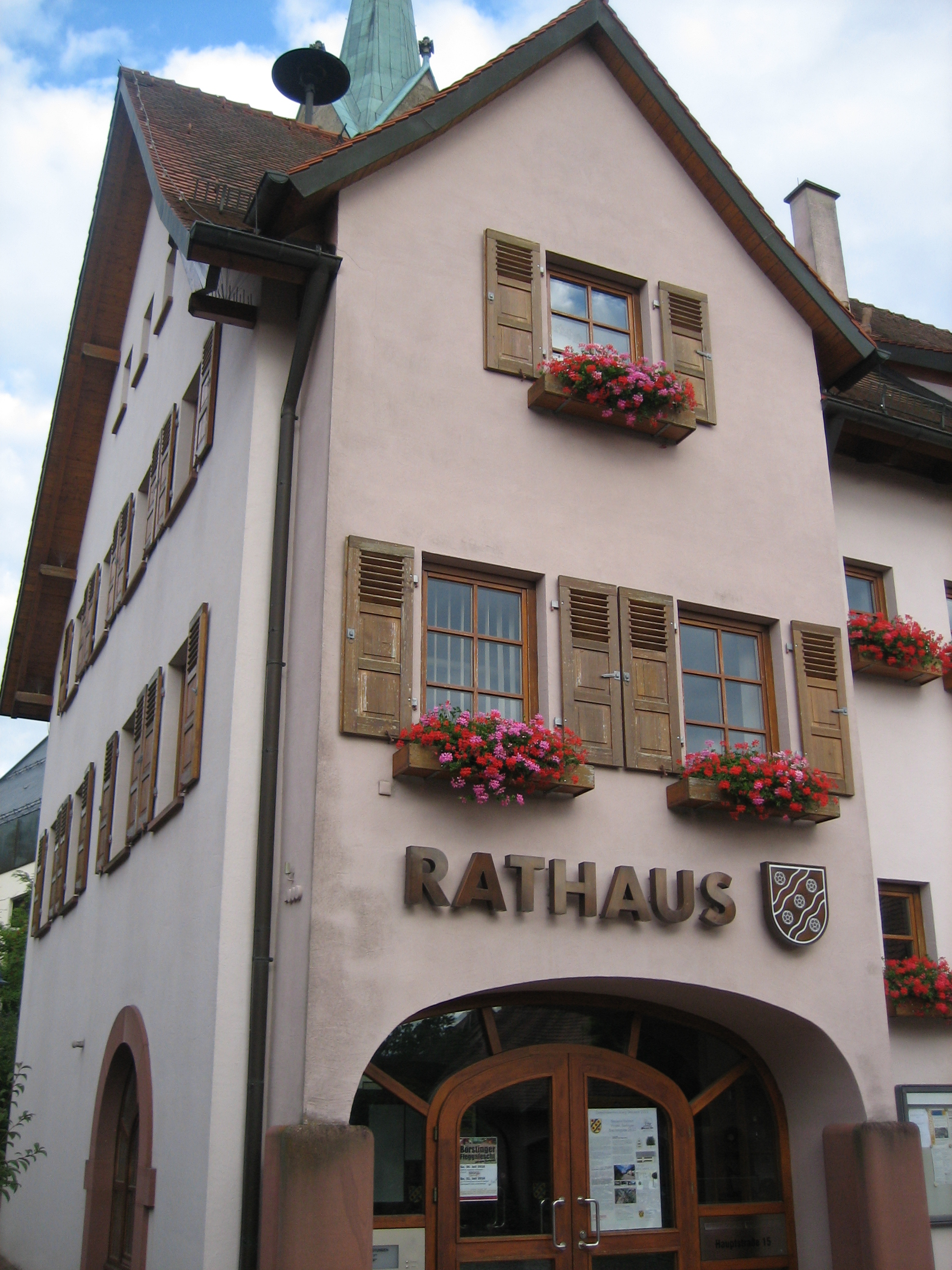
Bierlingen part of Starzach district Tübingen Town hall

== Council ==
The council Starzach has 15 members after the last election. The local elections on 25 May 2014 led to the following official results. The turnout was 53.3% (2009: 55.0%). The council consists of the elected honorary councilors and the mayor as chairman. The mayor is entitled to vote in the municipal council.

- Bürgervertretung Starzach (BVS) 8 seats 56.2% (2009: 0.0%)
- Freie Bürger Starzach (FBS) 7 seats 43.8% (2009: 27.1%)

== Mayor ==
The mayor is elected for a term of eight years. The current mayor Noè was re-elected on 29 January 2012.

- 1972-1982: Josef Oswald
- 1982-2003: Manfred Dunst
- since 2004: Thomas Noé

== Community partnerships ==
Since July 1992 Starzach is friendly connected with Bocage Gatinais near Paris, France.

== Transportation ==
The next traffic station is Eyach Station at the Tübingen-Horb railway .

== Buildings ==
Castle Wachendorf Castle Weitenburg

== Sons and daughters of the town ==
- Hans von Ow (1843-1921), born in Wachendorf, member of Reichstag and Landtag
- Ulrich Noll (1946-2011), born in Börstingen, dentist and politician (FDP), Member of Parliament, former chairman of the FDP/DVP Group in the Landtag of Baden-Württemberg.

== Starzach village laid ==
Every two years there is the Starzach village laid circling within the five villages.

== Starzach run ==
Every year takes place the 11.2 km long run Starzach Starzach-Wachendorf.
