= Hirrlingen =

- Municipality
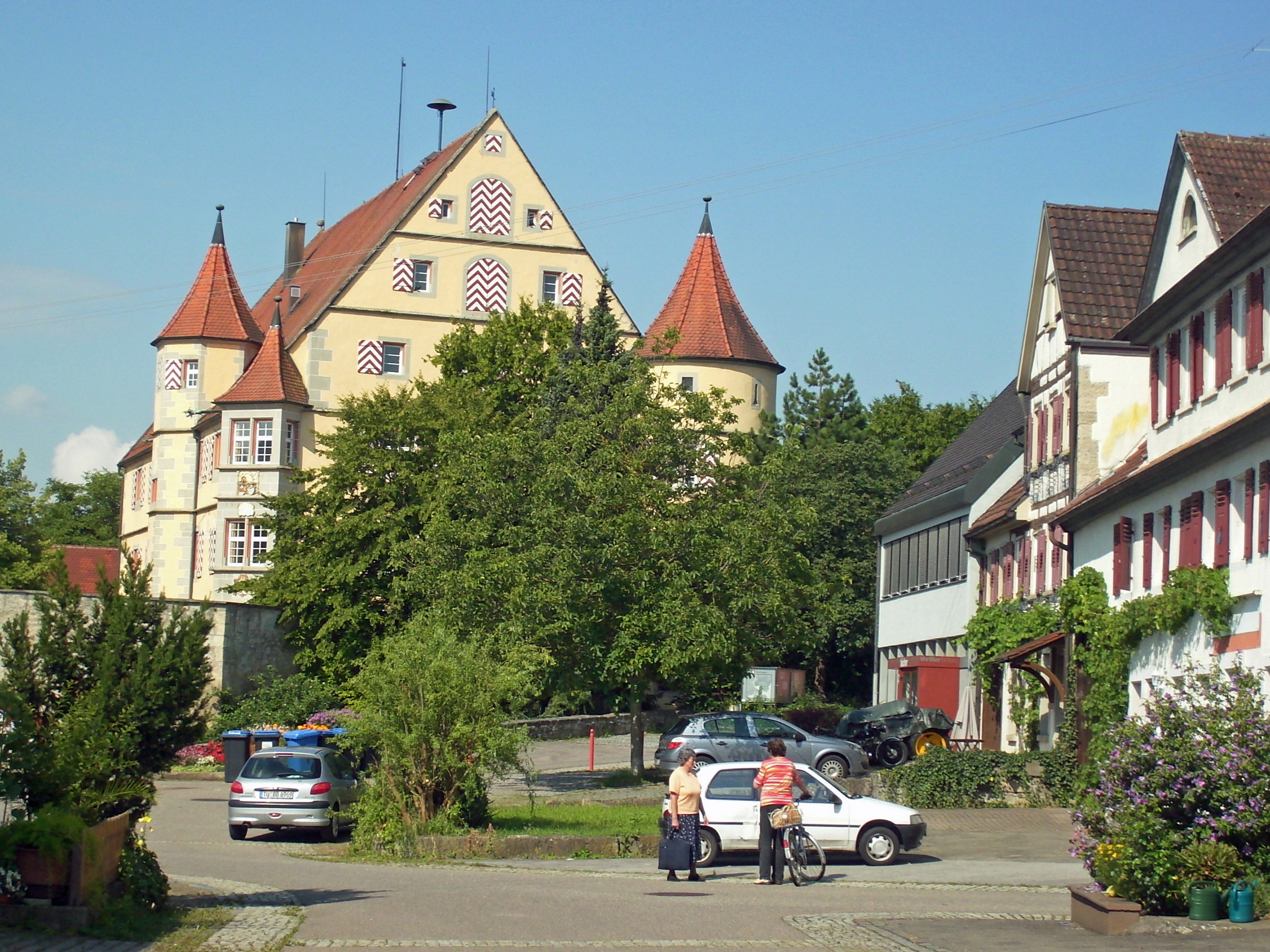

- Coat of arms

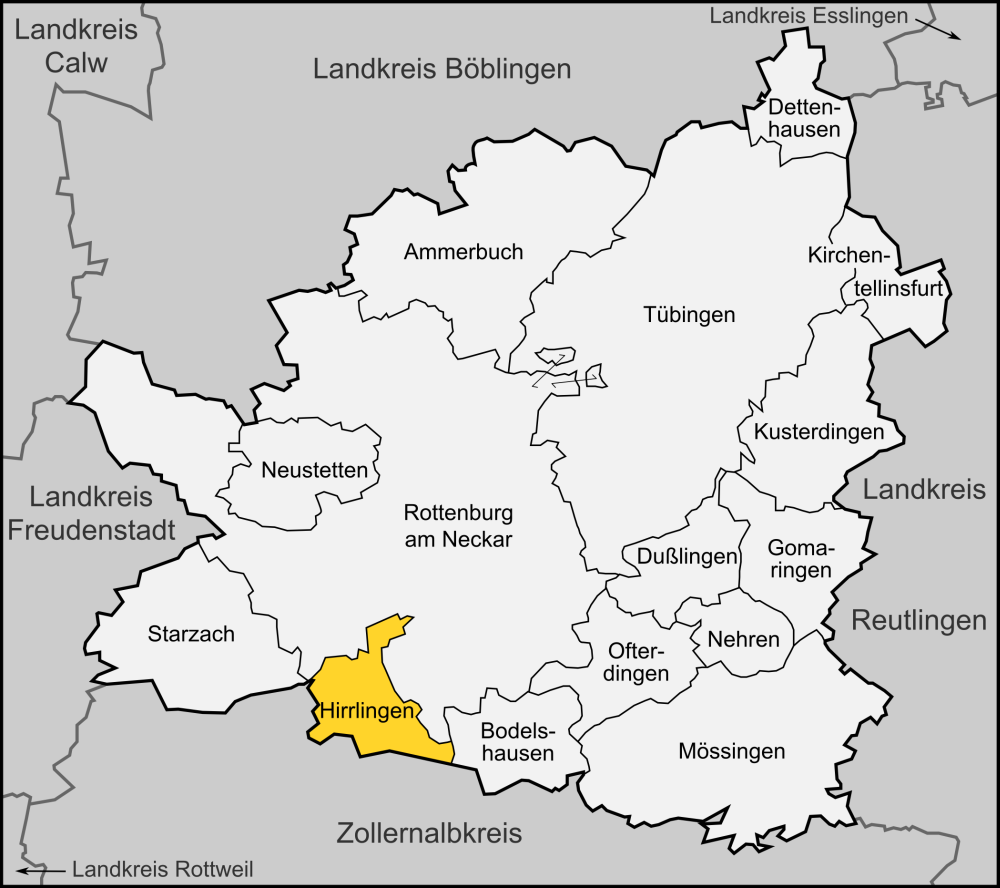
- Location of Hirrlingen within Tübingen district
- Interactive map of Hirrlingen
- Location within Germany Location within Baden-Württemberg
- Coordinates: 48°24′41″N 8°53′18″E
- Country: Germany
- State: Baden-Württemberg
- Admin. region: Tübingen
- District: Tübingen

Government
  - Mayor (2022–30): Simon König

Area
  - Total: 12.81 km^{2} (4.95 sq mi)
- Elevation: 445 m (1,460 ft)

Population (2025-12-31)
  - Total: 3,122
  - Density: 243.7/km^{2} (631.2/sq mi)
- Time zone: UTC+01:00 (CET)
  - Summer (DST): UTC+02:00 (CEST)
- Postal codes: 72145
- Dialling codes: 07478
- Vehicle registration: TÜ
- Website: www.hirrlingen.de

Hirrlingen is a municipality in the district of Tübingen in Baden-Württemberg in Germany. Hirrlingen is located about 15 kilometers southwest from Tübingen.

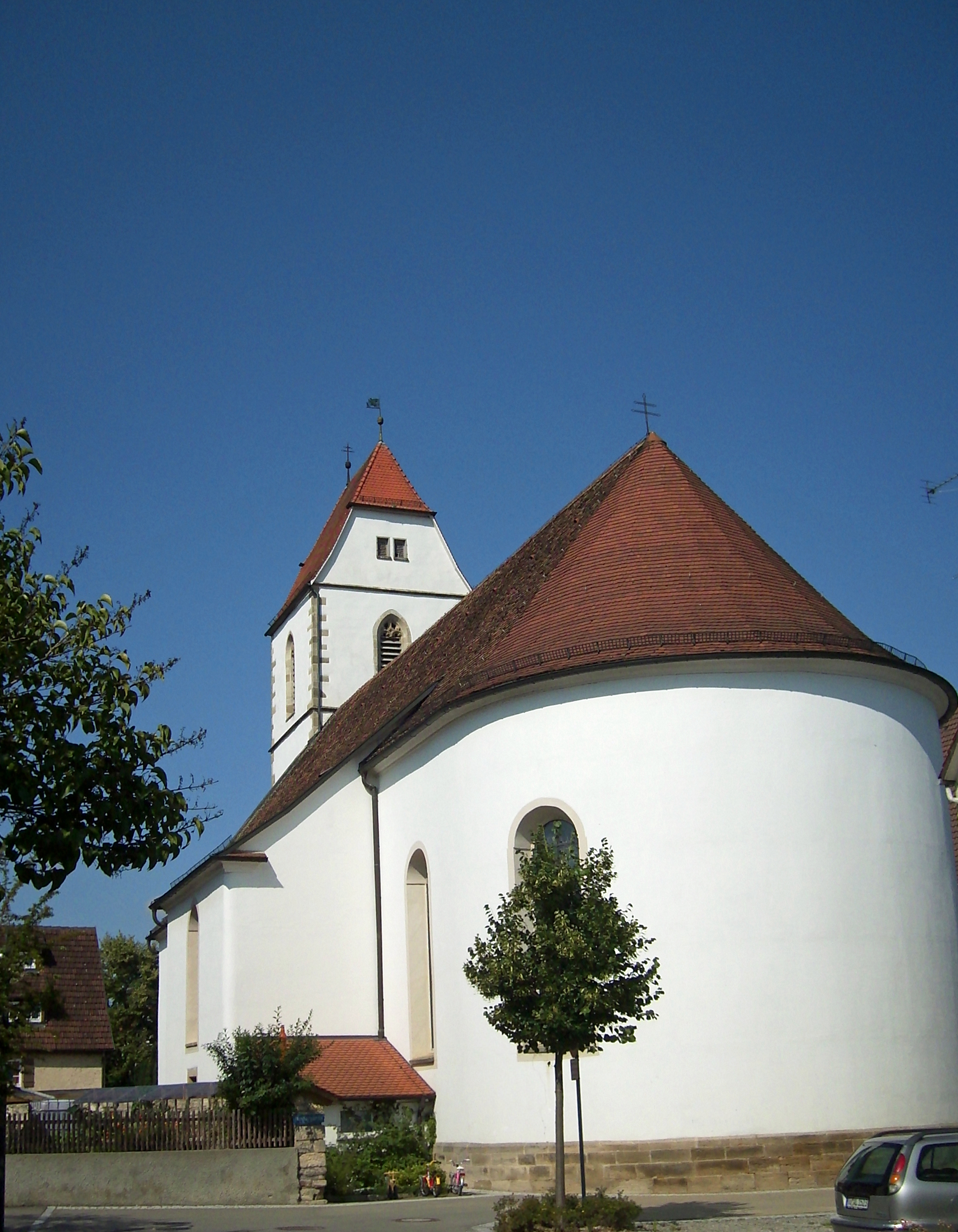
St. Martinus Church

== Geography ==
=== Geographic location ===
Hirrlingen is located roughly nine kilometers south west of Rotteburg am Neckar and around nine kilometers north west of Hechingen at the border of the landscape conservation area Rammert above the Starzel. Parts of the environmental protection zones Kapfhalde and Espenloch-Hintere Halde are located within the municipality Hirrlingen.

=== Size of the municipality ===
The total area of the municipality of Hirrlingen amounts to 1281hectare.

=== Neighboring communities ===
The cities and municipalities listed below border the municipality Hirrlingen. They are listed in clockwise order beginning in the north. They belong to the district of Tübingen or the district Zollernalbkreis¹ respectively:

Rottenburg am Neckar, Bodelshausen, Hechingen¹, Rangendingen¹ and Starzach.

=== Administrative structure ===
The municipality includes the village Hirrlingen and the Houses Obere Mühle and Untere Mühle, which translates to Upper Mill and Lower Mill.

The municipality also includes several abandoned villages. Bossenhausen an abandoned village in the East of the municipality was first mentioned as Bossenhusen in 1289 and was likely already abandoned in 1289. In the first half of the 12th century, an Ortschaft called Marpach or Marbach was located in what is today the Flur Harbach.

=== Protected areas ===
Starzach includes parts of the nature reserve of Espenloch-Hintere Halde as well as the landscape conservation areas Rauher Rammert and Katzenbachtal. Parts of the municipal area belong to the Special Areas of Conservation Rammert and Neckar and side valleys at Rottenburg.

== History ==
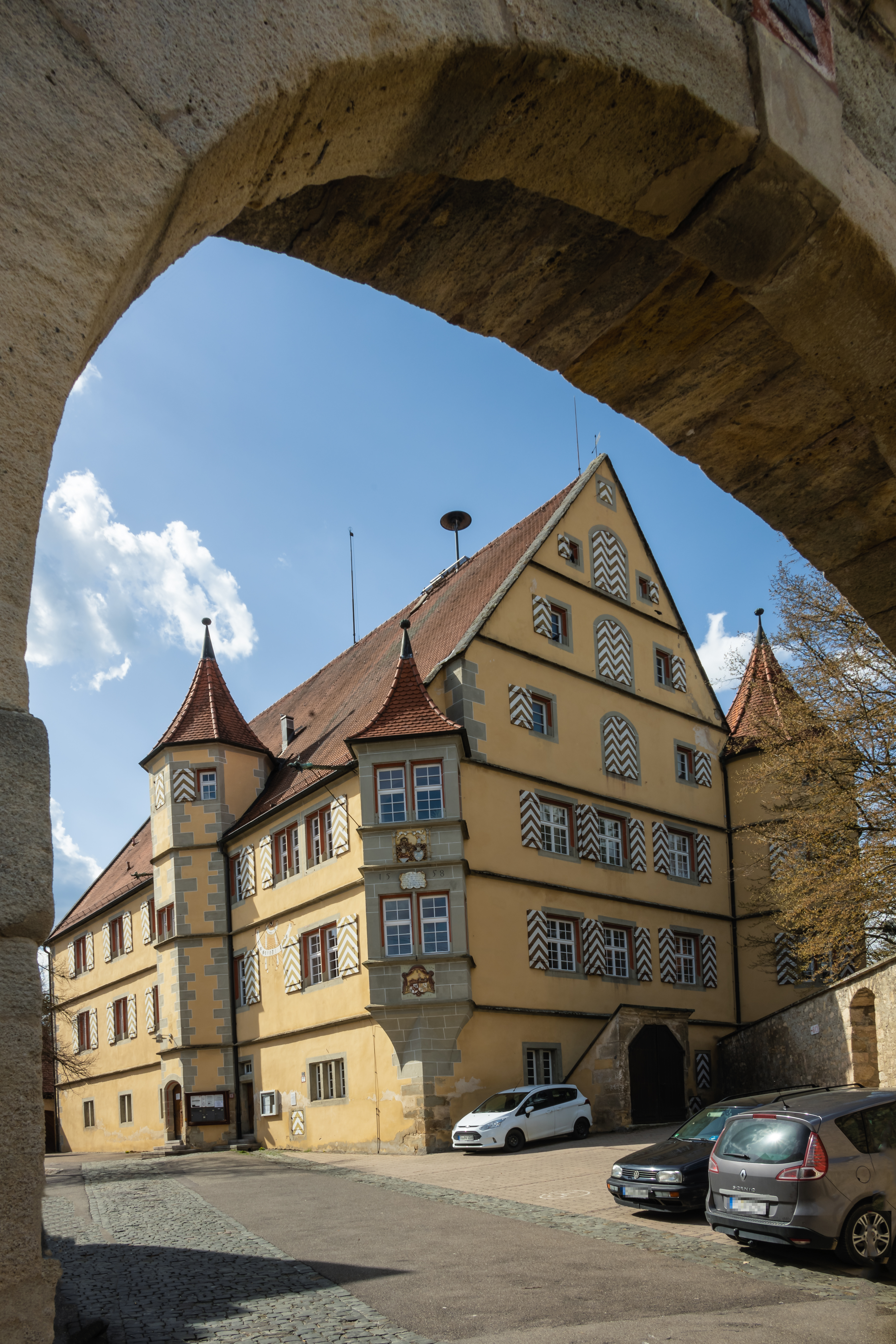
Castle Hirrlingen

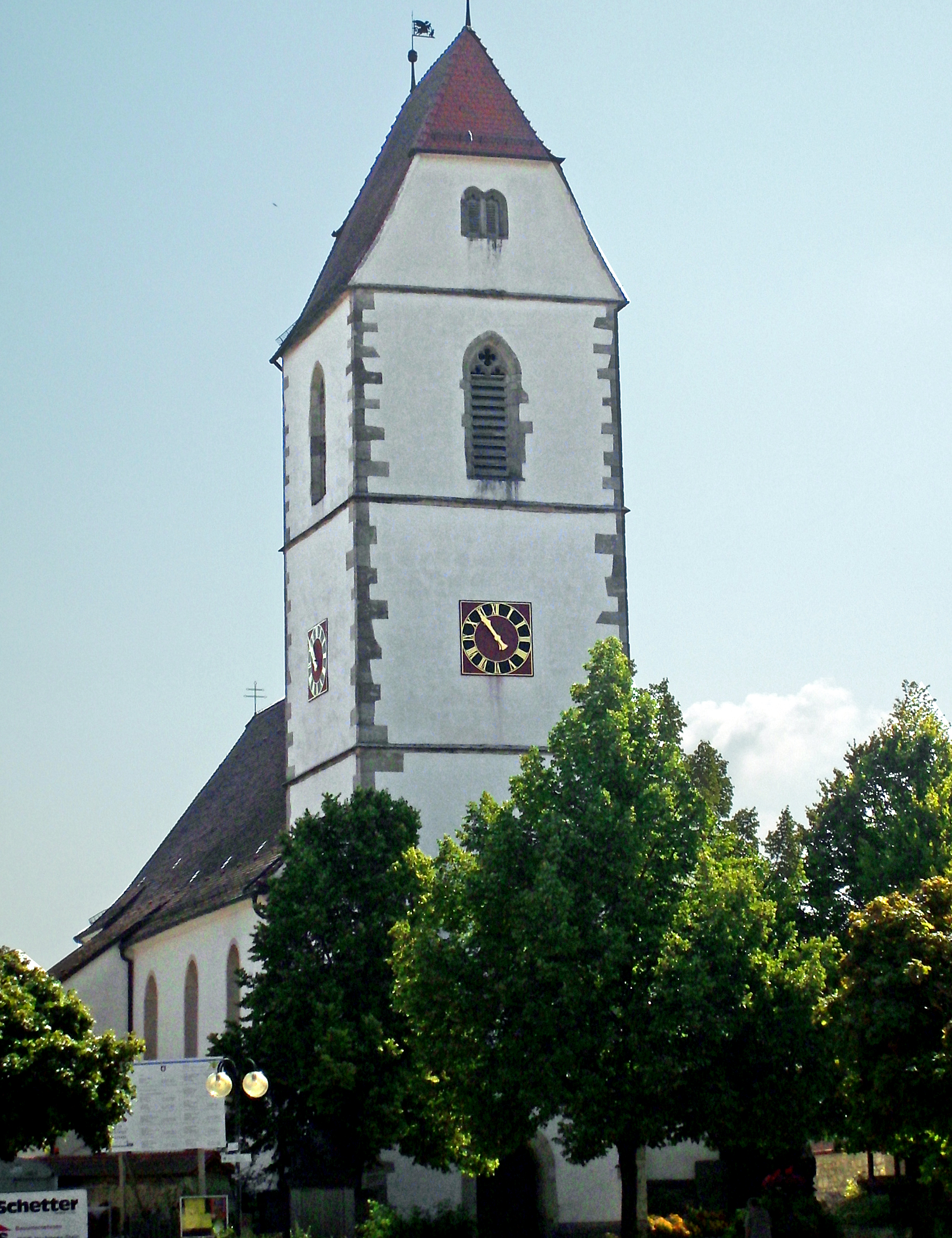
Church Hirrlingen

The first written mention of Hirrlingen was on a document from the All Saints Monastery in Schaffhausen written in the year 1091.

Around 1100, the Lords of Hirrlingen first appeared in historical sources. They lived and owned property or rights in and around Hirrlingen in the Duchy of Swabia. After the Lords of Hirrlingen went extinct, their property in Hirrlingen went to the Counts of Hohenberg in the 13th century who in turn enfeoffed the Lords of Ow. Through acquisitions made in the 15th and 16th century, the Ow established local lordship over Hirrlingen, which as a manor was part of the souvereignty of Further Austria. In 1557/1558, the Lords of Ow built the Hirrlingen castle, the St. Martin Church in 1606 and a St.-Sebastianus Brotherhood in the 18th century. In the 14th century, a women's monastery of the Dominican Order developed out of a community of religious women. The Bebenhausen Abbey also held some property in Hirrlingen for some time.

In 1709, the line of the Lords of Hirrlingen died out. Between 1749 and 1790, the Counts of Attems ruled over Hirrlingen. In 1789, the Dominican Monastrary was secularized.

In 1805, Hirrlingen went to the Electorate of Württemberg, which in 1806 turned into the Kingdom of Württemberg. When a was implemented in 1810, Hirrlingen was assigned to the so-called, an administrative unit.

In 1821, the castle was sold to the Municipality of Hirrlingen and was subsequently used as a town hall.

During the district reform in Württemberg in the Nazi era, the municipality became part of the district of Tübingen in 1938. In 1945, the village became part of the French occupation zone and thus came to the newly founded state of Württemberg-Hohenzollern, which merged with the state of Baden-Württemberg in 1952.

== Culture and Sights ==
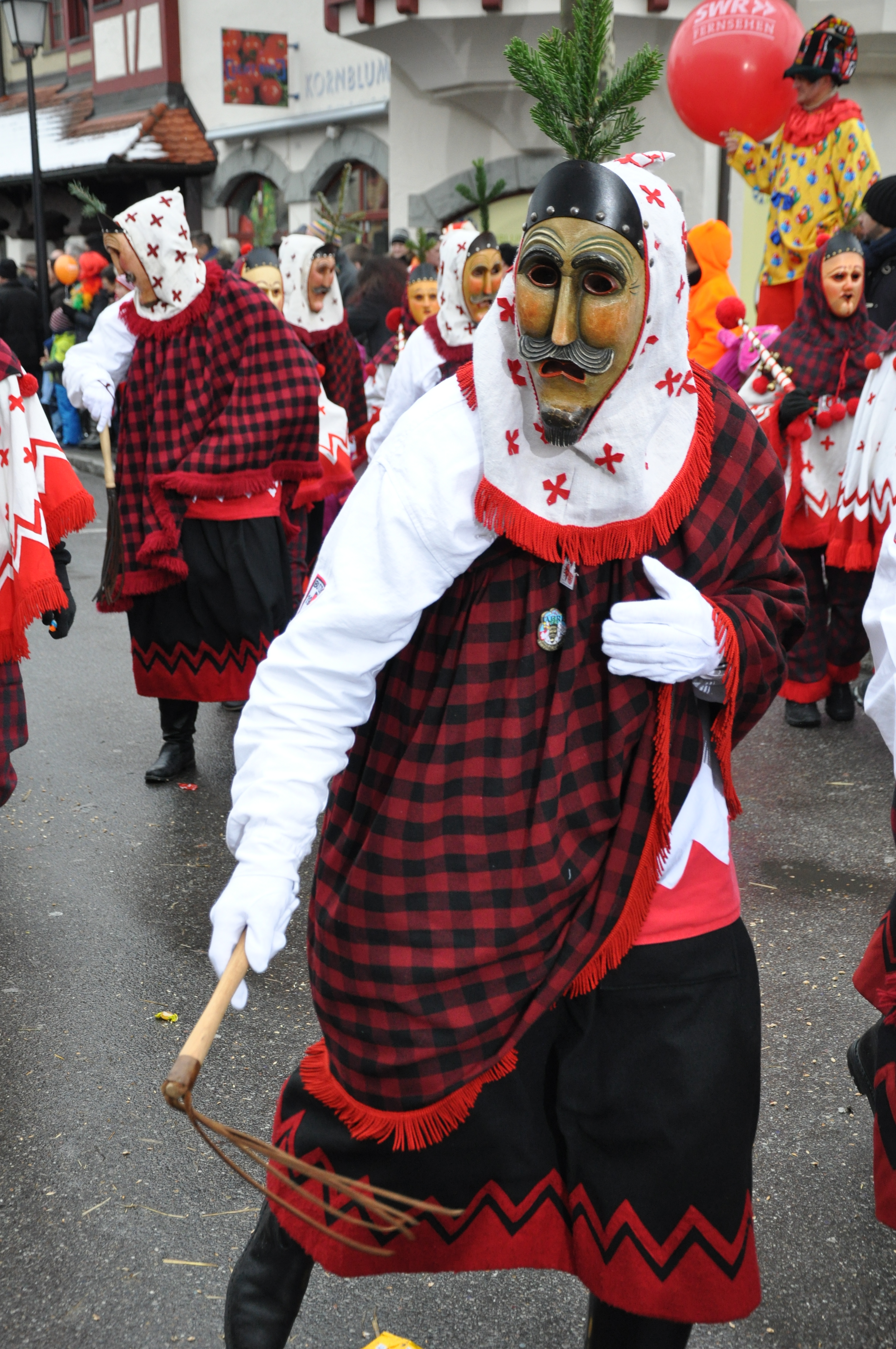
Jester figure „Butz“ in Hirrlingen

=== Buildings ===
- Baroque church, built in the 18th century
- Castle Hirrlingen, built in the 16th century

=== Regular Events ===
- Hammeltanz, tradition since 1578
- In Hirrlingen, the Swabian-Alemannic Fastnacht is being celebrated. The masked jester figure "Butz" can be traced back to the 18th century. The driving force of today's Fasnet is the Butzenzunft Hirrlingen, which was founded in 1962. The Butzenzunft is a member of the Association of Swabian-Alemannic Fools' Guild. The original Hirrlinger Schloßhexen with their various groups have also been active for over 40 years.

== Personalities ==
=== born in Hirrlingen ===
- Josef Zimmermann (1871–1929), Social Democratic politician, County Commissioner and Police President
- Vinzenz Stehle (1901–1967), politician (NSDAP), Member of the Reichstag
