= Dettingen (Rottenburg) =

- Part of Rottenburg am Neckar
- Coat of arms
- Interactive map of Dettingen
- Location within Germany Location within Baden-Württemberg
- Coordinates: 48°26′12″N 08°56′06″E
- Country: Germany
- State: Baden-Württemberg
- Admin. region: Tübingen
- District: Tübingen
- Town: Rottenburg am Neckar

Government
  - Mayor: Hubert Walz

Area
  - Total: 9.62 km^{2} (3.71 sq mi)
- Elevation: 386–558 m (1,266–1,831 ft)

Population (2018)
  - Total: 1,732
  - Density: 180/km^{2} (466/sq mi)
- Time zone: UTC+01:00 (CET)
  - Summer (DST): UTC+02:00 (CEST)
- Postal codes: 72108
- Dialling codes: (+49) 07472
- Vehicle registration: TÜ
- Website: www.rottenburg.de

Dettingen (German pronunciation: [ˈdɛtɪŋən]) is a suburban district of Rottenburg am Neckar in the administrative district of Tübingen in Baden-Württemberg (Germany).

== Geography ==
Dettingen is located 6 km (3.73 mi) southern from Rottenburg am Neckar, on the Gäu-Plateau with an elevation from 386 to 558 m.

=== Extent ===
The area of the district is 962 hectares.

== Population ==
Dettingen has a population of 1783 people (31/01/08). It is the fourth largest district of Rottenburg. At an area of 9.62 km^{2} (3.7 sq mi) this corresponds to a population density of 185 people per km^{2}, or 480 per sq mi.

=== Faiths ===
The population of the village is predominantly Roman Catholic.
