= Rangendingen =

German municipality

- Municipality
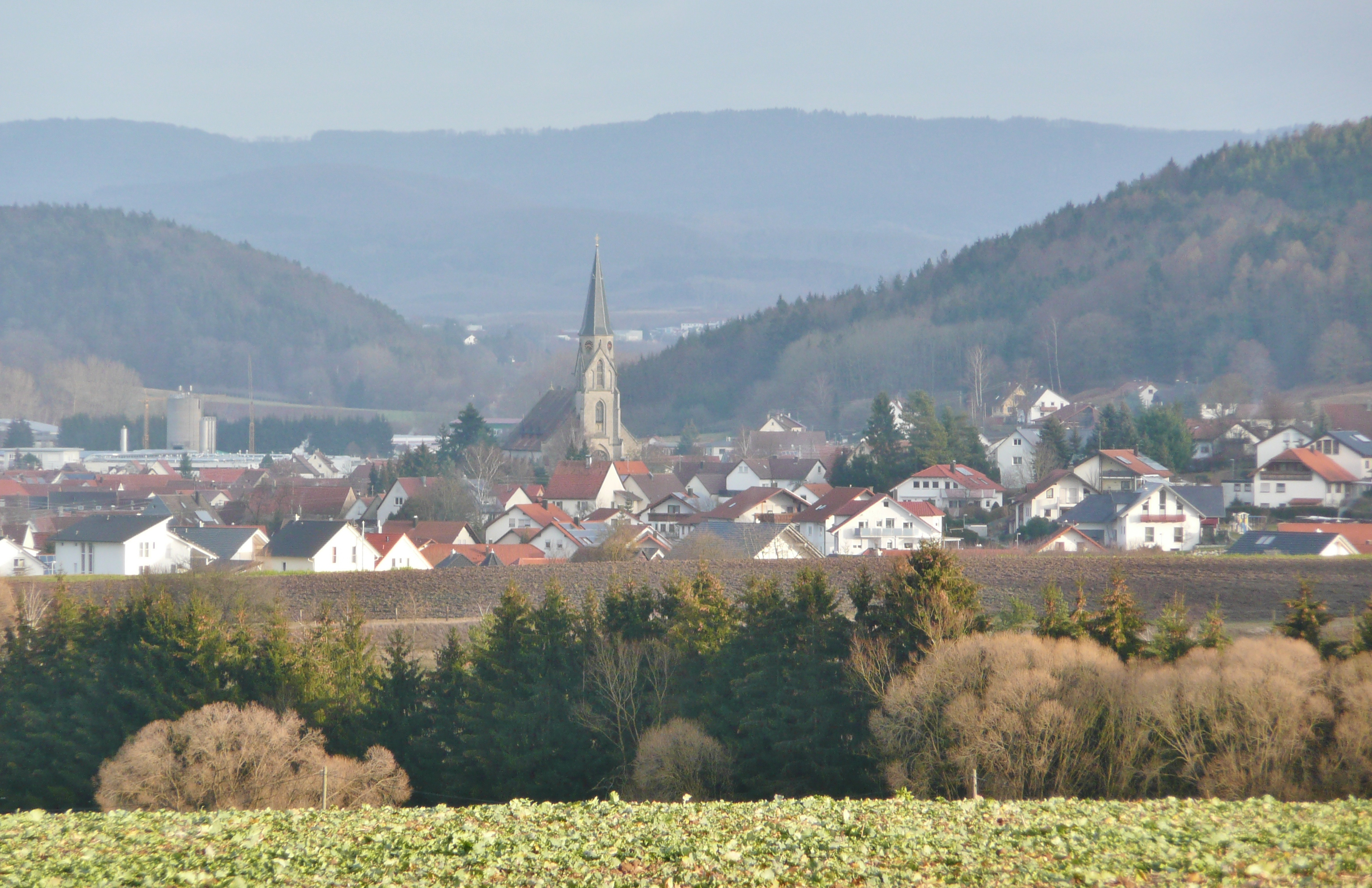
- Rangendingen from the west

- Coat of arms

- Location of Rangendingen within Zollernalbkreis district
- Interactive map of Rangendingen
- Location within Germany Location within Baden-Württemberg
- Coordinates: 48°22′52″N 08°53′20″E
- Country: Germany
- State: Baden-Württemberg
- Admin. region: Tübingen
- District: Zollernalbkreis
- Subdivisions: 3 Ortsteile

Area
  - Total: 21.68 km^{2} (8.37 sq mi)
- Elevation: 421 m (1,381 ft)

Population (2025-12-31)
  - Total: 5,331
  - Density: 245.9/km^{2} (636.9/sq mi)
- Time zone: UTC+01:00 (CET)
  - Summer (DST): UTC+02:00 (CEST)
- Postal codes: 72412–72414
- Dialling codes: 07471
- Vehicle registration: BL
- Website: www.rangendingen.de

Rangendingen is a municipality of the Zollernalbkreis district, in Baden-Württemberg, Germany.

== History ==
The Abbey of Saint Gall gained possession of Rangendingen around 800 AD. In the 16th century, the town became a possession of the Principality of Hohenzollern-Hechingen, which was annexed by the Kingdom of Prussia in 1850. Berlin assigned Rangendingen to Oberamt Hechingen, which was reorganized in 1925 as Landkreis Hechingen. Rangendingen grew dramatically after World War II, primarily through industrial and residential construction. Until the mid-1960s, the town expanded in all directions but primarily to the west and south. The 1973 Baden-Württemberg district reform dissolved the district of Hechingen, and Rangendingen was assigned to the newly created Zollernalb district. Another wave of construction began in the 1970s, beginning with the reconstruction of the town center, and lasted into the 1990s.

== Geography ==
The municipality (Gemeinde) of Rangendingen is located in the Zollernalb district of Baden-Württemberg, a state of the Federal Republic of Germany. It lies along the border with Tübingen district. Rangendingen is physically located on the Starzel in the Upper Gäu region. Portions of the municipal area also lie in the Glemswald and by extension by the southwestern foothills of the Swabian Jura. Elevation above sea level in the municipal area ranges from a high of 594 meters (1,949 ft) Normalnull (NN) at the top of the Hohwacht to a low of 384 meters (1,260 ft) NN on the Starzel.

Portions of the Federally-protected Espenloch-Hintere Halde and Kapfhalde nature reserves are located in the municipal area.

== Coat of arms ==
The municipal coat of arms for Rangendingen shows a black bear holding a red branch with three green leaves upon a field of yellow. The branch is a motif taken from a seal used in the town between 1784 and 1798 that shows a man with the branch in his left hand. The man and the branch are thought to be a reference to Heinrich von Lindach, a mid-15th century benefactor of Rangendingen who was celebrated as late as the 19th century. The present coat of arms, with a bear to represent St. Gallen, was approved by the Federal Ministry of the Interior on 9 February 1970.

== Transportation ==
Local public transportation is provided by the Verkehrsverbund Neckar-Alb-Donau.
