= Bieringen (Rottenburg) =

- Part of Rottenburg am Neckar
- Coat of arms
- Interactive map of Bieringen
- Location within Germany Location within Baden-Württemberg
- Coordinates: 48°27′06″N 08°51′22″E
- Country: Germany
- State: Baden-Württemberg
- Admin. region: Tübingen
- District: Tübingen
- Town: Rottenburg am Neckar

Government
  - Mayor: Walter Dettling

Area
  - Total: 6.86 km^{2} (2.65 sq mi)
- Elevation: 322–507 m (1,056–1,663 ft)

Population (2018)
  - Total: 667
  - Density: 97.2/km^{2} (252/sq mi)
- Time zone: UTC+01:00 (CET)
  - Summer (DST): UTC+02:00 (CEST)
- Postal codes: 72108
- Dialling codes: (+49) 07472
- Vehicle registration: TÜ
- Website: www.rottenburg.de

Bieringen is a suburban district of Rottenburg am Neckar in the administrative district of Tübingen in Baden-Württemberg, Germany.

== Geography ==
Bieringen is located 9 km (5.59 mi) southwestern from Rottenburg am Neckar in the Neckar valley.

=== Extent ===
The territory of the district is 689 hectares. Thereof fall 52.9% upon agriculturally used area, 37.2% upon forest area, 7.5% upon settlement area and roads, 1.2% upon water area and 0.6% upon other.

== Population ==
Bieringen has a population of 689 people (31/01/08). It is one of the smaller villages that belong to Rottenburg. At an area of 6.86 km² (2.6 sq mi) this corresponds to a population density of 101 people per km², or 261 per sq mi.

=== Faiths ===
The population of the village is predominantly Roman Catholic.
