= Bronnbach (river) =

River in Germany

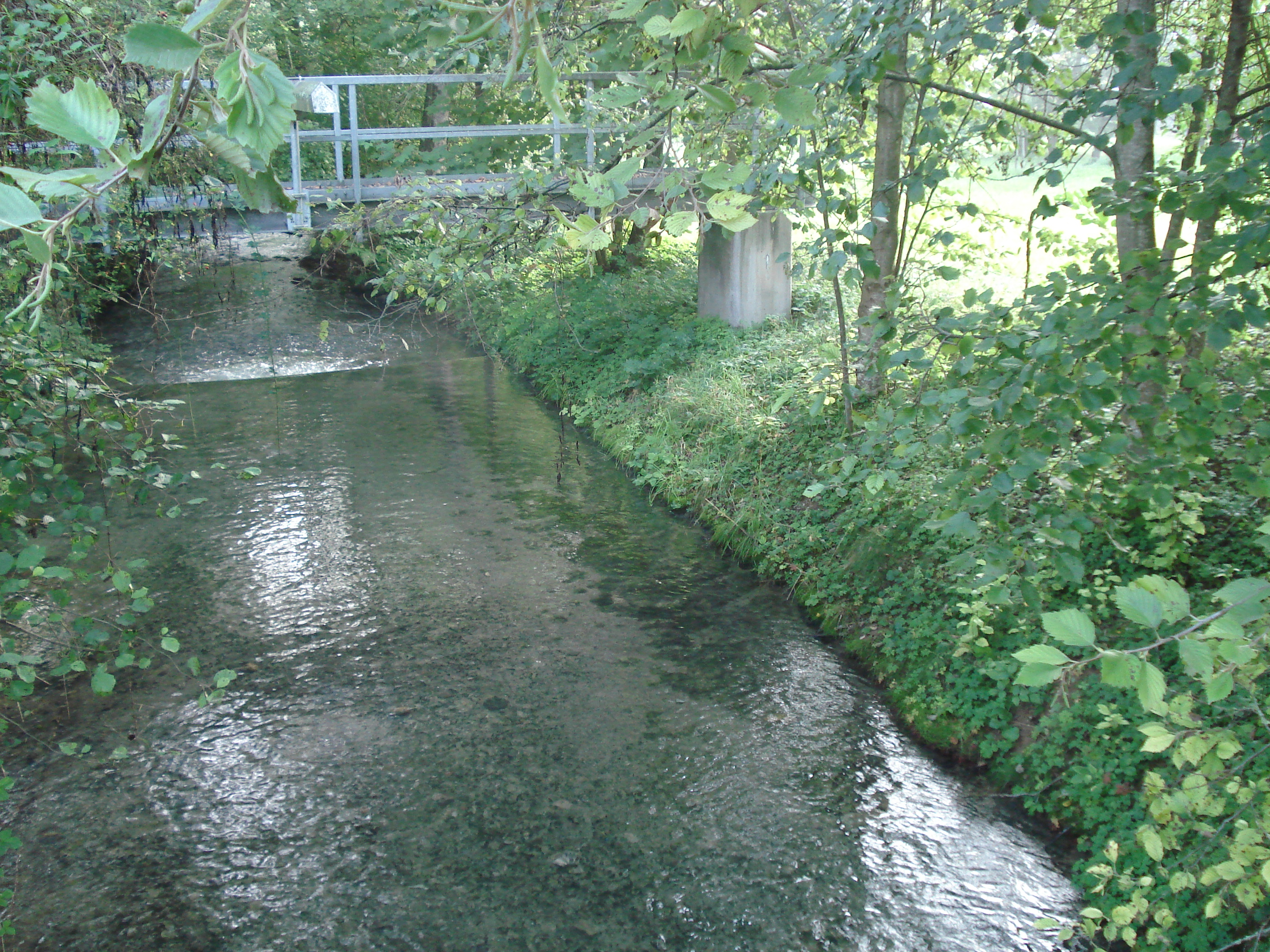
- The Bronnbach flowing from its spring

Location
- Country: Germany
- State: Baden-Württemberg

Physical characteristics
- Source
  - location: Bronnbachquelle
  - coordinates: 48°28′08″N 8°54′18″E
- Mouth
  - location: Neckar
  - coordinates: 48.4687°N 8.9094°E

Basin features
- Progression: Neckar→ Rhine→ North Sea

The Bronnbach is a short river in Baden-Württemberg, Germany. It flows into the Neckar near Rottenburg am Neckar.

The source of the Bronnbach is a strong Karst spring. Its spring box is located completely in the municipal waterworks. On average, the karst spring discharges about 450 litres of water per second (max. 1180 L/s); its catchment area covers about 90 to 100 km². The part of the spring water that is not fed into the drinking water supply flows through a drain pipe into the original course of the Bronnbach stream. After a good 400 m, this stream flows into the Neckar in the left Neckar floodplain at the Bronnmühle. The Bronnbachspring now supplies the city centre, the districts of Seebronn and Hailfingen as well as Weiler and Bad Niedernau south of the Neckar.

== See also ==
- List of rivers of Baden-Württemberg
