= Kiebingen =

- Part of Rottenburg am Neckar
- Coat of arms
- Interactive map of Kiebingen
- Location within Germany Location within Baden-Württemberg
- Coordinates: 48°28′32″N 08°58′23″E
- Country: Germany
- State: Baden-Württemberg
- Admin. region: Tübingen
- District: Tübingen
- Town: Rottenburg am Neckar

Government
  - Mayor: Elisabeth Schröder-Kappus (Greens)

Area
  - Total: 5.14 km^{2} (1.98 sq mi)
- Elevation: 327–516 m (1,073–1,693 ft)

Population (2018)
  - Total: 2,088
  - Density: 406/km^{2} (1,050/sq mi)
- Time zone: UTC+01:00 (CET)
  - Summer (DST): UTC+02:00 (CEST)
- Postal codes: 72108
- Dialling codes: (+49) 07472
- Vehicle registration: TÜ
- Website: www.rottenburg.de

Kiebingen is a suburban district of Rottenburg am Neckar in the administrative district of Tübingen in Baden-Württemberg, Germany.

== Geography ==
Kiebingen is located 3 km (1.9 mi) eastern from Rottenburg and 8 km (5 mi) western from Tübingen in the valley of the Neckar river.

=== Extent ===
The area of the district is 514 hectares. Thereof fall 60.1% upon agriculturally used area, 21.7% upon forest area, 14.7% upon settlement area and roads, 2.7% upon water extent and 0.8% upon other.

=== Neighbour localities ===
The territories of the following localities adjoin to Kiebingen, they are called clockwise beginning in the north: Wurmlingen, Hirschau, Bühl and Rottenburg (town), (all in the admin. district of Tübingen). Wurmlingen is also a suburb of Rottenburg, Hirschau and Bühl are suburbs of Tübingen. Wurmlingen and Hirschau are situated northern, Kiebingen and Bühl southern of the Neckar.

== Population ==
Kiebingen has 2007 residents (31/01/08). It is the third largest suburb of Rottenburg. At an area of 5.14 km² (2 sq mi) this corresponds to a population density of 390 people per km², or 1011 per sq mi.

== Twin village ==
- Lion-sur-Mer (France) since 1988
