= Wendelsheim (Rottenburg) =

- Part of Rottenburg am Neckar
- Coat of arms
- Interactive map of Wendelsheim
- Location within Germany Location within Baden-Württemberg
- Coordinates: 48°30′25″N 08°56′09″E
- Country: Germany
- State: Baden-Württemberg
- Admin. region: Tübingen
- District: Tübingen
- Town: Rottenburg am Neckar

Government
  - Mayor: Joachim Maul

Area
  - Total: 4.7 km^{2} (1.8 sq mi)
- Elevation: 335–475 m (1,099–1,558 ft)

Population (2018)
  - Total: 1,639
  - Density: 350/km^{2} (900/sq mi)
- Time zone: UTC+01:00 (CET)
  - Summer (DST): UTC+02:00 (CEST)
- Postal codes: 72108
- Dialling codes: (+49) 07472
- Vehicle registration: TÜ
- Website: www.rottenburg.de

Wendelsheim is a suburban district of Rottenburg am Neckar in the administrative district of Tübingen in Baden-Württemberg (Germany).

== Geography ==
Wendelsheim is located 4 km (2.5 mi) northern from Rottenburg and 11 km (6.8 mi) southwestern from Tübingen.

=== Extent ===
The area of the district is 470 hectares. Thereof fall 71.0% upon agriculturally used area, 15.1% upon forest area, 13.6% upon settlement area and roads, 0.2% upon water expanse and 0.2% upon other.

=== Neighbour localities ===
The territories of the following localities adjoin to Wendelsheim, they are called clockwise beginning in the north: Oberndorf, Wurmlingen, Rottenburg (town), Seebronn. All bordering localities are in the administrative district of Tübingen, and all are part of the Town of Rottenburg.

== Population ==
Wendelsheim has 1555 inhabitants (31/01/08). It is one of the largest suburbs of Rottenburg. At an area of 4.70 km^{2} (1.8 sq mi) this corresponds to a population density of 331 people per km^{2}, or 857 per sq mi.

=== Faiths ===
The population is predominantly Roman Catholic.

== Politics ==
=== Sister village ===
- Ablis (Île-de-France) since 1979
