= Baisingen =

- Part of Rottenburg am Neckar
- Coat of arms
- Interactive map of Baisingen
- Location within Germany Location within Baden-Württemberg
- Coordinates: 48°30′15″N 08°46′36″E
- Country: Germany
- State: Baden-Württemberg
- Admin. region: Tübingen
- District: Tübingen
- Town: Rottenburg am Neckar

Government
  - Mayor: Horst Schuh (CDU)

Area
  - Total: 7.20 km^{2} (2.78 sq mi)
- Elevation: 435–532 m (1,427–1,745 ft)

Population (2018)
  - Total: 1,266
  - Density: 176/km^{2} (455/sq mi)
- Time zone: UTC+01:00 (CET)
  - Summer (DST): UTC+02:00 (CEST)
- Postal codes: 72108
- Dialling codes: (+49) 07457
- Vehicle registration: TÜ
- Website: www.rottenburg.de

Baisingen is a suburban district of Rottenburg am Neckar in the administrative district of Tübingen in Baden-Württemberg (Germany).

== Geography ==
Baisingen is located 15 km (9.32 mi) western from Rottenburg am Neckar, 8 km (4.97 mi) southeastern from Nagold and 12 km (7.45 mi) northeastern from Horb am Neckar. The elevation on the territory of Baisingen is 465 to 532 m.

=== Extent ===
The territory of the district is 720 hectares. Thereof fall 79.5% upon agriculturally used area, 9.3% upon forest area, 10.8% upon settlement area and roads, 0.1% upon water area and 0.2% upon other.

=== Neighbour localities ===
The territories of the following villages adjoin Baisingen, moving clockwise beginning in the north: Mötzingen^{1}, Ergenzingen^{2}, Göttelfingen^{3}, Vollmaringen^{4}. Ergenzingen is, like Baisingen, a district of Rottenburg.

^{1}Böblingen (district); ^{2}Tübingen (district); ^{3}Freudenstadt (district); ^{4}Calw (district)

== Population ==
Baisingen has a population of 1277 people (31/01/08). At an area of 7.20 km² (2.8 sq mi) this corresponds to a population density of 177 people per km², or 459 per sq mi.

== Culture and Sights ==
=== Buildings ===
The old synagogue of Baisingen has been restored.
