= Martin Eisengrein =

German Catholic theologian, university professor and polemical writer

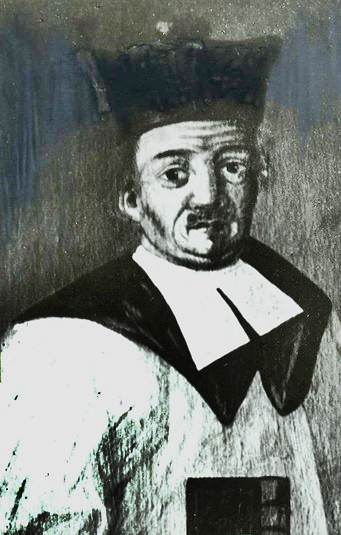
Martin Eisengrein

Martin Eisengrein (28 December 1535 – 4 May 1578) was a German Catholic theologian, university professor, and polemical writer.

== Biography ==
He was born of Lutheran parents, Martin and Anna Kienzer Eisengrein, at Stuttgart. He studied the humanities at the Latin school of Stuttgart, and the liberal arts and philosophy at the University of Tübingen. To please his father, who was burgomaster of Stuttgart, Eisengrein matriculated as student of jurisprudence at the University of Ingolstadt, 25 May 1553, but before a year had passed he was at the University of Vienna, where he took the degree of Master of Arts in May, 1554.

During the tolerant rule of Ferdinand I, Eisengrein, though still a Protestant, became in 1555 professor of oratory and, two years later, of physics at the University of Vienna, a Catholic institution. His Catholic surroundings and frequent contact with the Jesuits of Vienna had great influence in bringing about his acceptance of the Catholic faith, and under the influence of his uncle, the Imperial Vice Chancellor Jakob of Jonas, his conversion took place about 1558. In 1559 he received a canonry at St. Stephen's in Vienna, and a year later he was ordained priest. In 1562 he went to the University of Ingolstadt whither he had been invited by the superintendent of the university, Frederick Staphylus. He was appointed pastor of the church of St. Moritz, which was incorporated with the university, and in April of the same year he was elected rector of the university. There he promoted the celebration of the Feast of Corpus Christi that was just then beginning to appear.

In 1563, he travelled to the shrine of Hohenwart. Upon his return, he preached a sermon later published as A Christian Sermon Concerning the Reasons Shrines Are Held in Such High Esteem in the Catholic Church, one of the first counter-reformational defenses of the cult of the saints and pilgrimage. "[I]n his sermons, printed works, and pastoral ministrations Eisengrein strove to resurrect and reform the religious life of Bavaria's shrines."

Besides being professor, he devoted much of his time to the study of theology and, after receiving the degree of licentiate in this science on 11 November 1563, he began to teach it in January, 1564. Duke Albert V of Bavaria chose him as councillor, appointed him provost of the collegiate church of Moosburg, and shortly afterwards of the collegiate church of Altötting and the cathedral church of Passau. In 1563 and 1564 he took part in the politico-religious conferences at the imperial court of Vienna; in 1566 Duke Albert sent him to Pope Pius V to advocate the appointment of Prince Ernest as Prince-Bishop of Freising.

In 1567, he was appointed provost of the collegiate church of the Shrine of Our Lady of Altötting. Eisengrein worked to reform the shrine's collegiate church and to encourage pilgrimage. That year he published a book, Our Lady of Altötting, defending the practice of pilgrimage. In 1568-9 he was imperial court chaplain at Vienna. In 1570 he was appointed superintendent of the University of Ingolstadt, and henceforth he turned his whole attention to the advancement of the university.

In 1568 and 1569 Eisengrein worked in Vienna as the court preacher of Emperor Maximilian II, before returning to Ingolstadt in 1570.

Just at this time the friction between the lay professors and the Jesuits, which dated from the time when the latter began to hold professorial chairs at the university in 1556, threatened to become serious. In 1568 Eisengrein and Peter Canisius had peacefully settled certain differences between the two factions, but when in 1571 Duke Albert decided to put the pœdagogium and the philosophical course into the hands of the Jesuits, the other professors loudly protested. By his tact Eisengrein succeeded in temporarily reconciling the non-Jesuit professors to the new arrangement. Soon, however, hostilities began anew, and in order to put an end to these quarrels, the Jesuits transferred the Pœdagogium and philosophical course to Munich in 1573. It seems that the Jesuits were indispensable to the University of Ingolstadt, for two years later they were urgently requested by the university to return, and in 1576 they moved into the newly built Jesuit College of Ingolstadt. Eisengrein always had the welfare of the university at heart. He publicly acknowledged the efficiency of the Jesuits as educators in an oration on 19 February 1571. There were, indeed, some differences between Eisengrein and the Jesuits in 1572, but the estrangement was only temporary, as is apparent from the fact that he bequeathed 100 florins to the Jesuit library. He died at Ingolstadt.

He was instrumental in most church reforms in Bavaria, he seemed rather peaceful and conciliatory than brash polemical. Eisengrein appears at all stages of his life as a true personality distinguished by wisdom and moral purity. The greatest service which Eisengrein rendered the University of Ingolstadt was his organization of its library. It was owing to his efforts that the valuable private libraries of Bishop Johann Eglof von Knöringen, of Augsburg, Thaddeus Eck, chancellor of Duke Albert, and Rudolph Clenek, professor of theology at Ingolstadt, were added to the university library.

== Works ==
Eisengrein's activities were not confined to the university. By numerous controversial sermons, some of which are masterpieces of oratory, he contributed to the suppression of Lutheranism in Bavaria. Many of his sermons were published separately and collectively in German and Latin during his lifetime. Some have been edited by Johann Nepomuk Brischar in "Die kathol. Kanzelredner Deutschlands" (Schaffhausen, 1867–70), I, 434-545.

He is also the author of a frequently reprinted history of the shrine of the Blessed Virgin at Altötting (Ingolstadt, 1571). Lastly, he worked on editing a trilogy of books which served to explain every Sunday's Gospel reading. The first volume, Aurea postilla (1573) contained Patristic exegeses; the second, which was never published, was to focus on medieval theologians; and the third, the Postilla Catholica (1576), contained the exegeses of contemporary theologians and controversialists.

== Literature ==
Friedrich Wilhelm Bautz: iron Grein, Martin. In: Biographic-bibliographic church encyclopedia (BBKL). Volume 1, Bautz, Hamm 1975. 2, unchanged edition Hamm, 1990, ISBN 3-88309-013-1, Sp 1481st.

Hermann Tüchle: Iron Grein, Martin . In: New German Biography (NDB), vol. 4, Duncker & Humblot, Berlin, 1959, ISBN 3-428-00185-0, pp. 412 f. (digitized).

Karl Werner: Eisengrin, Martin . In: General German Biography (ADB). Volume 5, Duncker & Humblot, Leipzig, 1877, p 765 Michael Denis: Vienna printers History to 1560 (Vienna, 1782).
