= Johann Nepomuk Brischar =

German Roman Catholic church historian

Johann Nepomuk Brischar or Johann Nepomucene Brischar (22 August 1819, Horb, Württemberg – 11 April 1897, Bühl) was a Roman Catholic church historian.

== Life and works ==
Brischar studied theology at the University of Tübingen and was appointed parish priest of Bühl near Rottenburg in 1853, where he died in 1897. His principal work is the continuation of Count Friedrich Leopold zu Stolberg's History of the Religion of Jesus Christ, of which he wrote volumes forty-five to fifty-four, bringing the history up to 1245 CE. His share of the work does not reach the high standard of his great predecessor. He is also the author of a work in two volumes on the controversies between Paolo Sarpi and Francesco Sforza Pallavicino, and of a monograph on Pope Innocent III. His Catholic Pulpit Orators of Germany in five volumes was published in Schaffhausen in the years 1866-71. He contributed many articles to the Wetzer-Welte Kirchenlexikon.
