= Villa Louis, Lion-sur-Mer =

House in France

Coordinates: 49.3030°N 0.3156°W

La Villa Louis in Lion-sur-Mer, Normandy, France, was built in 1864 for Pierre Joseph and Elisa Pasquet to be used as a casino. she was musician and piano teacher, their son modify the building in 1903 to be use as a villa. The French architect Jean Alexandre Navarre add the first floor with the Art-Nouveau loggia on the sea side. The ceramics of the both side of the house are the works of Alexandre Bigot. The building have been occupied during Second World War as lion-sur-Mer was a part of the Atlantic Wall.It have been damaged during D-Day, Lion-sur-Mer is located on Sword Beach then use as hotel call "Le Castel" until 1967. It is now a guest house since 2017 website of the guest house. The Villa Louis is a listed historical monument since 1998.

Other interesting building or Lion-sur-Mer / Hermanville coast : La Bluette by French architecte Hector Guimard.
