= Eckenweiler =

- Part of Rottenburg am Neckar
- Coat of arms
- Interactive map of Eckenweiler
- Location within Germany Location within Baden-Württemberg
- Coordinates: 48°28′20″N 08°48′59″E
- Country: Germany
- State: Baden-Württemberg
- Admin. region: Tübingen
- District: Tübingen
- Town: Rottenburg am Neckar

Government
  - Mayor: Carmen Hess

Area
  - Total: 1.98 km^{2} (0.76 sq mi)
- Elevation: 440–510 m (1,440–1,670 ft)

Population (2018)
  - Total: 561
  - Density: 283/km^{2} (734/sq mi)
- Time zone: UTC+01:00 (CET)
  - Summer (DST): UTC+02:00 (CEST)
- Postal codes: 72108
- Dialling codes: (+49) 07457
- Vehicle registration: TÜ
- Website: www.rottenburg.de

Eckenweiler is a suburban district of Rottenburg am Neckar in the administrative district of Tübingen in Baden-Württemberg (Germany).

== Geography ==
Eckenweiler is located 13 km (8.07 mi) western from Rottenburg am Neckar, 14 km (8.7 mi) southeastern from Nagold and 12 km (7.45 mi) northeastern from Horb am Neckar. The elevation in the territory of Baisingen is 465 to 532 m.

=== Extent ===
With 198 hectares Eckenweiler has the smallest territory of all districts of Rottenburg. 73.5% of the territory fall upon agriculturally used area, 12.2% upon forest area, 12.2% upon settlement area and roads, 0.5% upon water area and 0.5% upon other.

== Population ==
Eckenweiler has a population of 514 people (31/01/08). It is one of the smallest districts of Rottenburg. At an area of 1.98 km² (0.8 sq mi) this corresponds to a population density of 260 people per km², or 672 per sq mi.

=== Faiths ===
The population of the village is predominantly Protestant.
