= Hailfingen =

Suburban district of Rottenburg am Neckar in Baden-Württemberg, Germany

- Part of Rottenburg am Neckar
- Coat of arms
- Interactive map of Hailfingen
- Location within Germany Location within Baden-Württemberg
- Coordinates: 48°31′42″N 08°52′09″E
- Country: Germany
- State: Baden-Württemberg
- Admin. region: Tübingen
- District: Tübingen
- Town: Rottenburg am Neckar

Government
  - Mayor: Horst Schlamp

Area
  - Total: 7.51 km^{2} (2.90 sq mi)
- Elevation: 391–468 m (1,283–1,535 ft)

Population (2018)
  - Total: 1,677
  - Density: 223/km^{2} (578/sq mi)
- Time zone: UTC+01:00 (CET)
  - Summer (DST): UTC+02:00 (CEST)
- Postal codes: 72108
- Dialling codes: (+49) 7457
- Vehicle registration: TÜ
- Website: www.rottenburg.de

Hailfingen is a suburban district of Rottenburg am Neckar in the administrative district of Tübingen in Baden-Württemberg (Germany).

== Geography ==
Hailfingen is located 9 km (5.6 mi) northwestern from Rottenburg am Neckar and 9 km southern from Herrenberg.

=== Extent ===
The area of the district is 751 hectares. Thereof fall 75.0% upon agriculturally used area, 13.1% upon forest area, 11.2% upon settlement area and roads and 0.7% upon other.

=== Neighbour localities ===
The territories of the following villages adjoin to Hailfingen, they are called clockwise beginning in the north: Tailfingen, Reusten, Oberndorf, Seebronn and Bondorf.

Bondorf and Tailfingen are in the administrative district of Böblingen, the other villages are in the administrative district of Tübingen. The villages Oberndorf and Seebronn are also suburbs of Rottenburg. Bondorf is an independent municipality. Tailfingen belongs to the municipality of Gäufelden and Reusten is a part of the municipality of Ammerbuch.

== Population ==
Hailfingen has 1581 residents (31/01/08). At an area of 7.51 km² (2.9 sq mi) this corresponds to a population density of 211 people per km², or 545 per sq mi.

=== Faiths ===
About 50 percent of the population is Roman Catholic.
