= Jean-François Sarasin =

French writer (1611–1654)

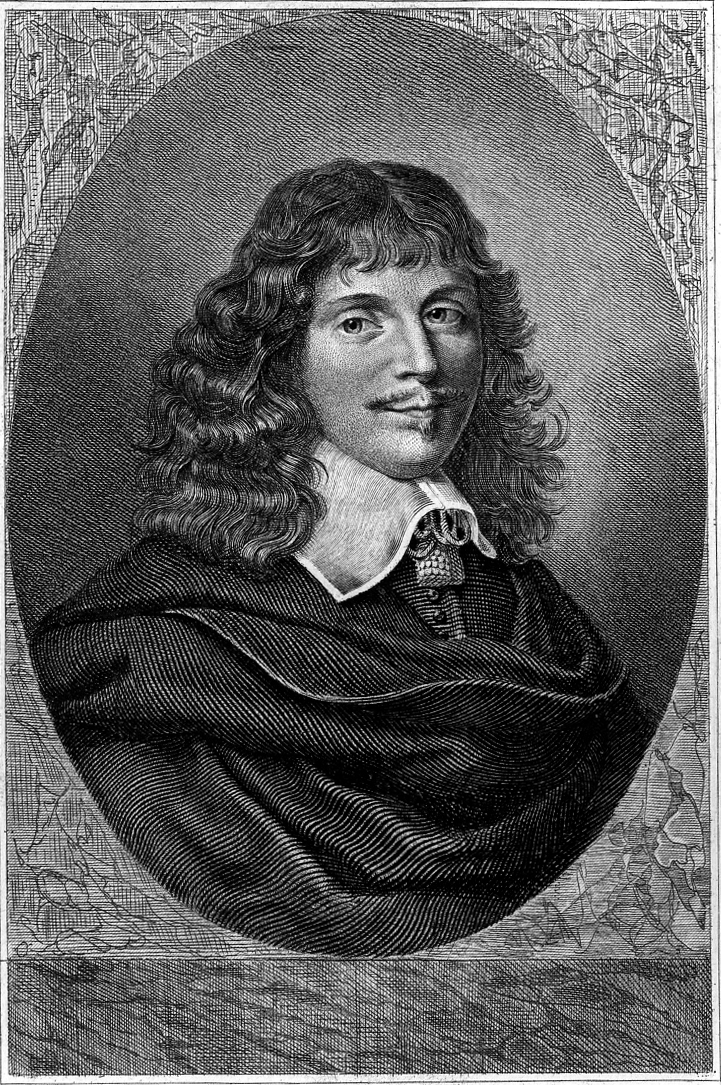
- Engraving by Charles Devrits
- Born: c. 1614; Hermanville
- Died: 5 December 1654; Pézenas
- Citizenship: France
- Occupation: Writer
- Writing career
- Language: French

Jean François Sarasin (French pronunciation: [ʒɑ̃ fʁɑ̃swa saʁazɛ̃]; c. 1611 – 5 December 1654) was a French writer.

== Biography ==
Sarasin was born at Hermanville, near Caen, the son of Roger Sarasin, treasurer-general at Caen.

He was educated at Caen, and later settled in Paris. As a writer of vers de société he rivalled Voiture, but he was never admitted to the inner circle of the hôtel de Rambouillet. He was on terms of intimate friendship with Scarron, with whom he exchanged verses, with Ménage, and with Pellisson. In 1639 he supported Georges de Scudéry in his attack on Corneille with a Discours de la tragédie. He accompanied Léon Bouthillier, comte de Chavigny, secretary of state for foreign affairs, on various diplomatic errands. He was to have been sent on an embassy to Rome, but spent the money allotted for the purpose in Paris. This weakened his position with Chavigny, from whom he parted in the winter of 1643–1644.

To restore his fallen fortunes he married a rich widow, but the alliance was of short duration. He joined in the pamphlet war against Pierre de Montmaur, against whom he directed his satire, Bellum parasiticum (1644). He was accused of writing satires on Mazarin, and for a short time gave up the practice of verse. In 1648, supported by the cardinal de Retz and Madame de Longueville, he entered the household of Armand de Bourbon, prince de Conti, whose marriage with Mazarin's niece he helped to negotiate. He died of fever at Pézenas, in Languedoc on 5 December 1654.

His biographers have variously stated on inadequate evidence that his death was caused by the prince de Conti in a moment of passion, or that he was poisoned by a jealous husband. The most considerable of his poems were the epic fragments of Rollon conquérant, la guerre espagnole, with Dulot vaincu and the Pompe funèbre in honour of Voiture. As a poet he was overrated, but he was the author of two excellent pieces of prose narration, the Histoire du siége de Dunkerque (1649) and the unfinished Conspiration de Walstein (1651). The Walstein has been compared for elegance and simplicity of style to Voltaire's Charles XII.

His Œuvres appeared in 1656, Nouvelles Œuvres (2 vols.) in 1674. His Poésies were edited in 1877 by Octave Uzanne with an introductory note. Much of his correspondence is preserved in the library of the Arsenal, Paris. See Albert Mennung's Jean François Sarasins Leben und Werke (2 vols., Halle, 1902–1904).
