= Hemmendorf (Rottenburg) =

- Part of Rottenburg am Neckar
- Coat of arms
- Interactive map of Hemmendorf
- Location within Germany Location within Baden-Württemberg
- Coordinates: 48°25′05″N 08°55′12″E
- Country: Germany
- State: Baden-Württemberg
- Admin. region: Tübingen
- District: Tübingen
- Town: Rottenburg am Neckar

Government
  - Mayor: Hans Saile

Area
  - Total: 6.57 km^{2} (2.54 sq mi)
- Elevation: 405–528 m (1,329–1,732 ft)

Population (2018)
  - Total: 842
  - Density: 128/km^{2} (332/sq mi)
- Time zone: UTC+01:00 (CET)
  - Summer (DST): UTC+02:00 (CEST)
- Postal codes: 72108
- Dialling codes: (+49) 07478
- Vehicle registration: TÜ
- Website: www.rottenburg.de

Hemmendorf is a suburban district of Rottenburg am Neckar in the administrative district of Tübingen in Baden-Württemberg (Germany).

== Geography ==
Hemmendorf is located about 9 km (5.6 mi) southern from Rottenburg am Neckar, on the Gäu-Plateau with an elevation from 405 to 528 m.

=== Extent ===
The area of the district is 657 hectares. Thereof fall 54.8% upon agriculturally used area, 34.1% upon forest area, 9.7% upon settlement area and roads, 0.5 upon water expanse and 0.9% upon other.

== Population ==
Hemmendorf has 848 inhabitants (31/01/08). It is among the smaller districts of Rottenburg. At an area of 6.57 km² (2.5 sq mi) the population density represents 129 people per km², or 334 per sq mi.

=== Faiths ===
Most of the population is predominantly Roman Catholic.
