= Weggental =

Pilgrimage church in Germany

Coordinates: 48°28′48″N 8°55′15″E

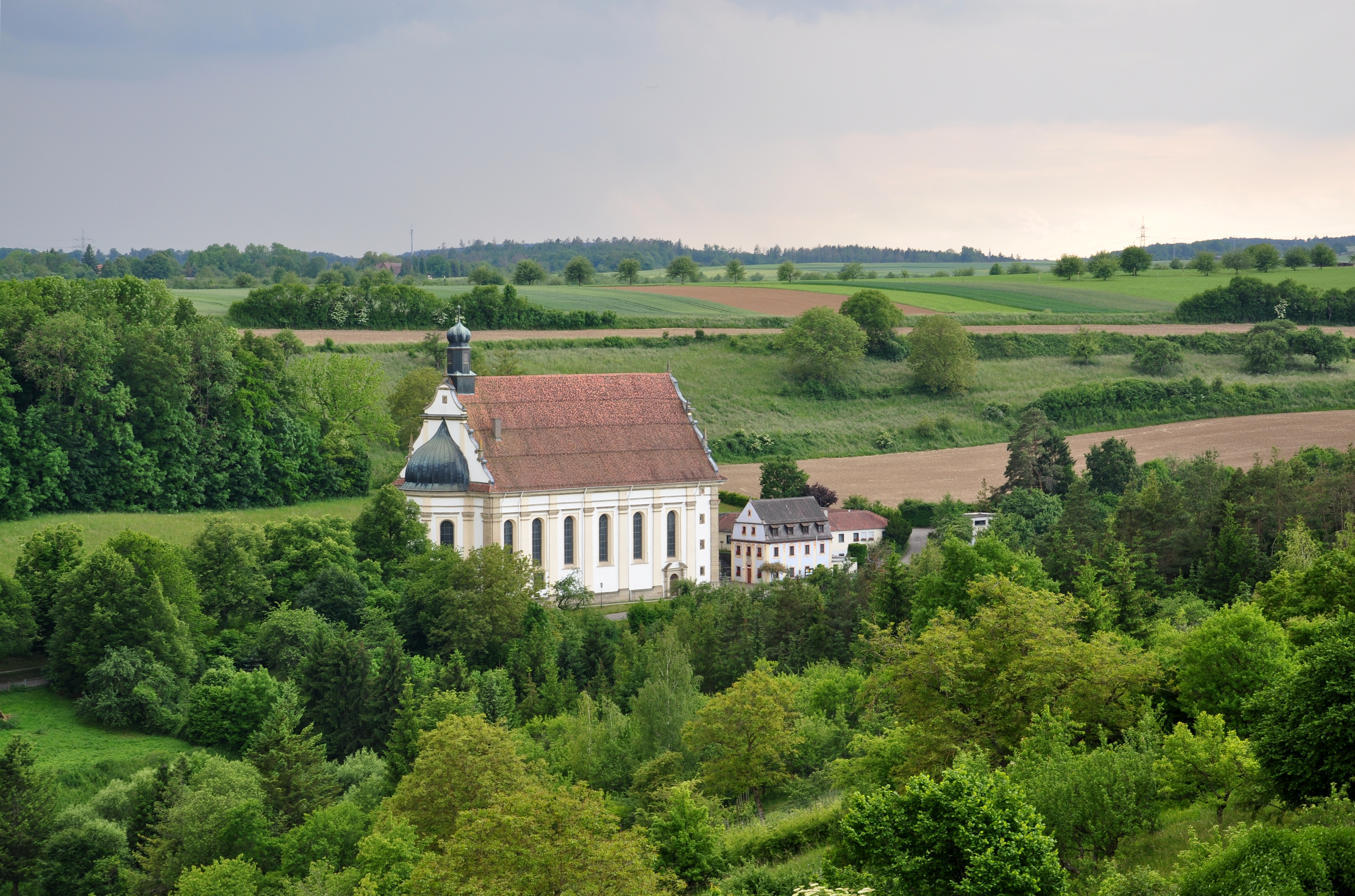
Pilgrimage Church Weggental

Weggental (full name: Wallfahrtskirche zur Schmerzhaften Mutter Gottes) is a Roman Catholic pilgrimage church, built in the Baroque period, close to Rottenburg am Neckar.

== History ==
Weggental's historical origins date back to the 15th century when a wayside shrine at the location of today's church turned into a place of Marian devotion. Thanks to the pastoral care of the Jesuits, the pilgrimage to Weggental became more and more popular in the region over the late 17th and 18th century. Over the same period, the church, as it is today, was built. In 1919, Franciscan friars were asked by the Bishop of the Diocese Rottenburg-Stuttgart to establish a small community in a building next to the church. New buildings were added to the monastery in the 1960s. In 2016, the Franciscans closed their monastery and gave the church back to the Diocese Rottenburg-Stuttgart.

== Organ ==
Weggental's organ was replaced by a new instrument in 2014 that was built by organ maker Thomas Jann. The organ has 32 registers on three keyboards and pedals.

== See also ==
- List of Jesuit sites

== See also ==
- Catholic Church in Germany
