= Hirschau (Tübingen) =

- Village of Tübingen
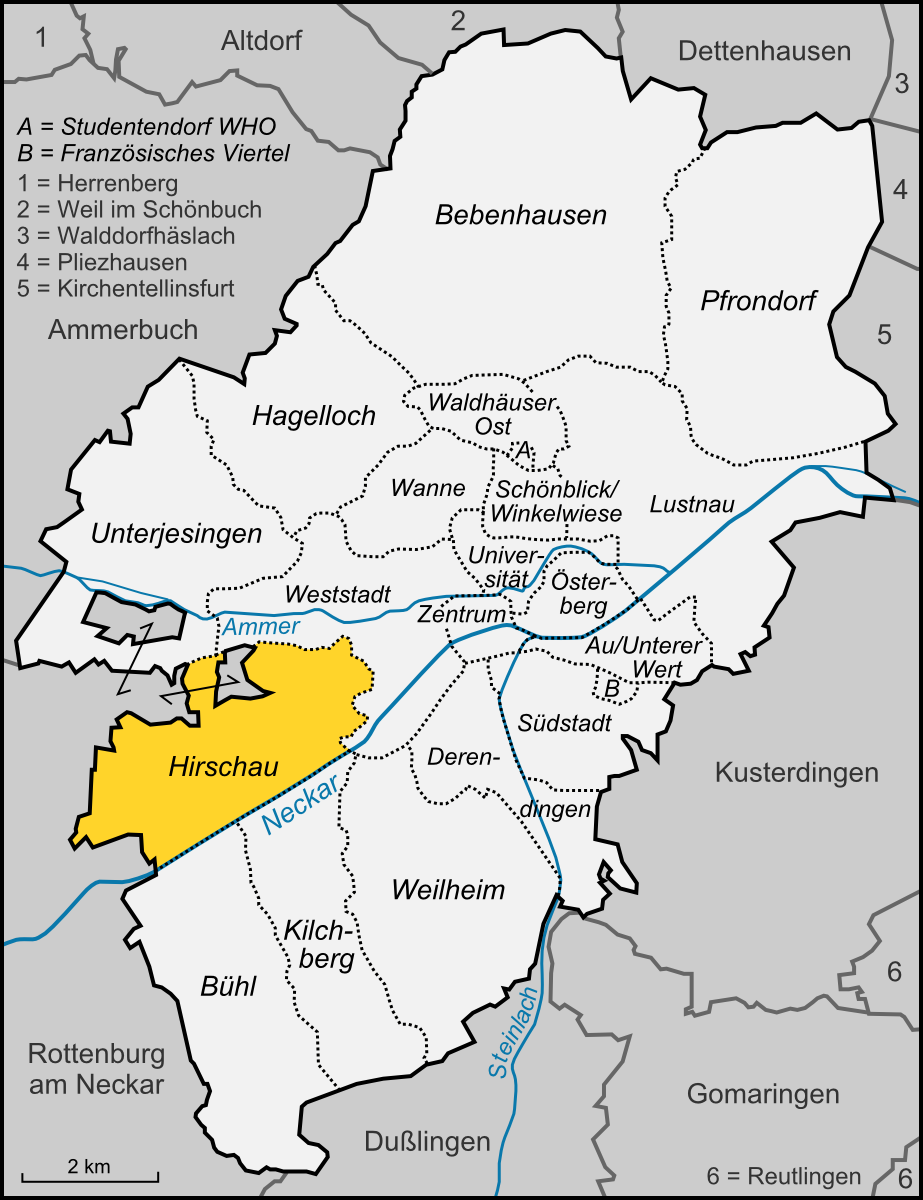
- Location of Hirschau within Tübingen
- Interactive map of Hirschau
- Location within Germany Location within Baden-Württemberg
- Coordinates: 48°30′05″N 8°59′40″E
- Country: Germany
- State: Baden-Württemberg
- District: Tübingen
- Town: Tübingen

Area
  - Total: 6.17 km^{2} (2.38 sq mi)
- Elevation: 330–475 m (1,083–1,558 ft)

Population (2020-12-31)
  - Total: 3,297
  - Density: 534/km^{2} (1,380/sq mi)
- Time zone: UTC+01:00 (CET)
  - Summer (DST): UTC+02:00 (CEST)

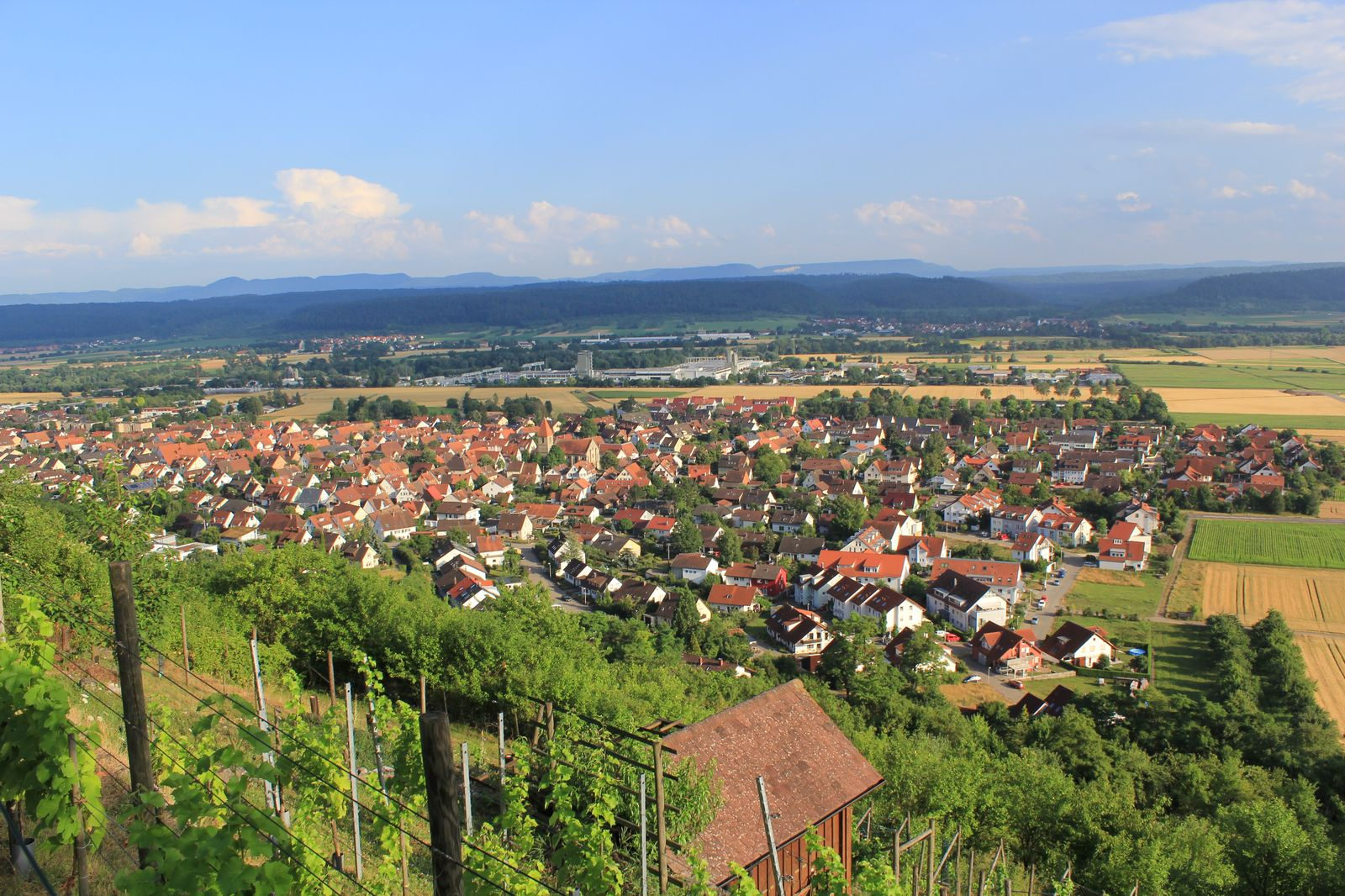
Tübingen-Hirschau

Hirschau (German pronunciation: [ˈhɪʁʃaʊ]) is a village in Tübingen district in Baden-Württemberg, Germany. Since 1971, it is an outer district of the city of Tübingen.

Hirschau has a population of 3297 (2020) on an area of 6.17 km^{2}. It is the westernmost district of Tübingen. Hirschau lies to the north of the Neckar river, about 3 km to the east of Wurmlingen, which is a part of Rottenburg am Neckar, and about 6 km to the east of the town centre of Rottenburg am Neckar as well as to the west of the city centre of Tübingen.

The highest point is the Spitzberg at 475 m above mean sea level.

Unlike most of Tübingen, Hirschau is, like neighbouring Rottenburg, mostly Roman Catholic.
