= Lion-sur-Mer =

- Commune
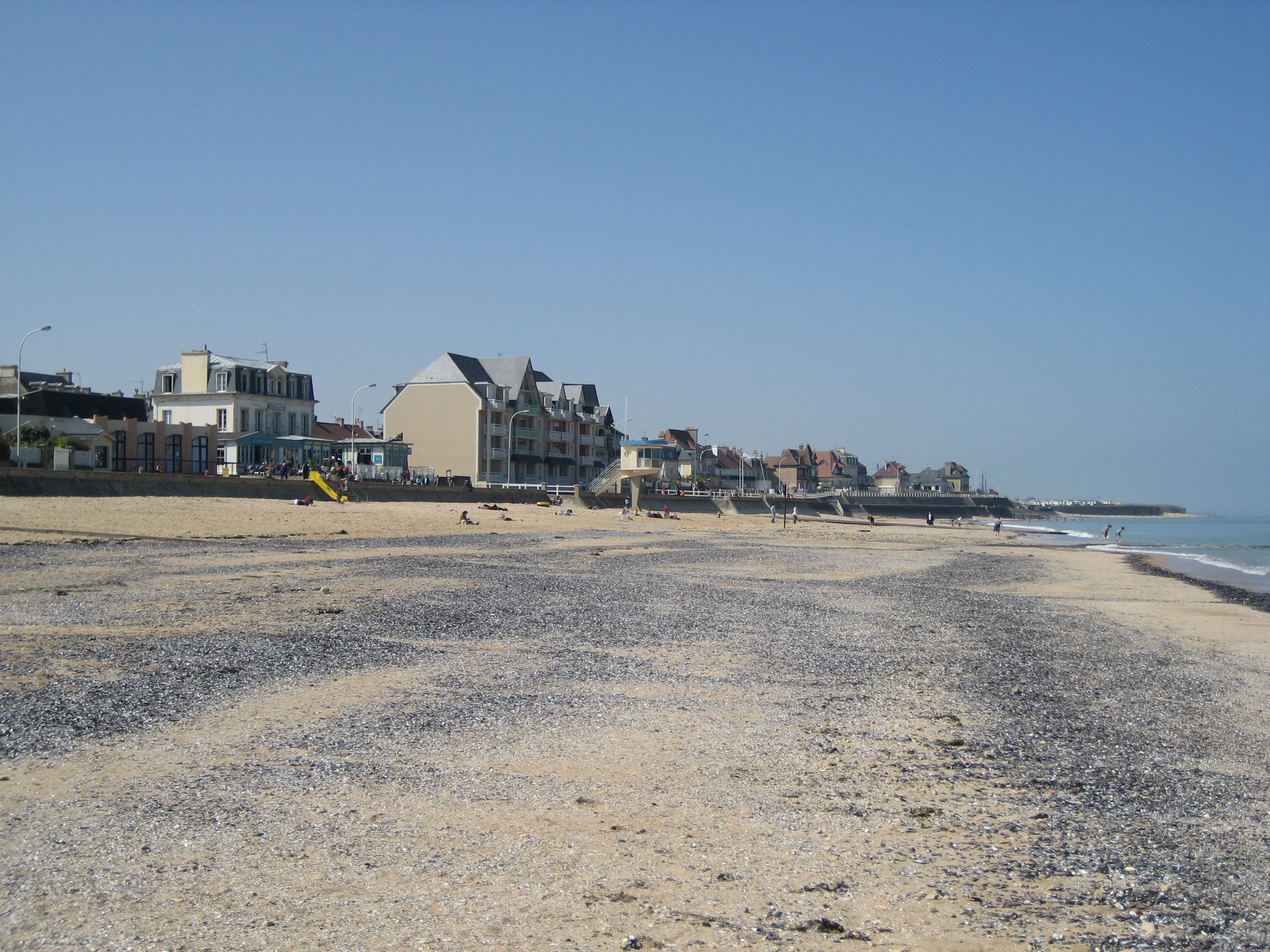
- Beach along the English Channel

- Coat of arms
- Location of Lion-sur-Mer
- Location within France Location within Normandy
- Coordinates: 49°18′07″N 0°19′03″W
- Country: France
- Region: Normandy
- Department: Calvados
- Arrondissement: Caen
- Canton: Ouistreham
- Intercommunality: CU Caen la Mer

Government
  - Mayor (2026–32): Magali Saint
- Area^{1}: 4.75 km^{2} (1.83 sq mi)
- Elevation: 6 m (20 ft)
- Highest elevation: 30 m (98 ft)
- Lowest elevation: 0 m (0 ft)
- Population (2023): 2,486
  - Density: 523/km^{2} (1,360/sq mi)
- Time zone: UTC+01:00 (CET)
  - Summer (DST): UTC+02:00 (CEST)
- INSEE/Postal code: 14365 /14780
- ^{1} French Land Register data, which excludes lakes, ponds, glaciers > 1 km^{2} (0.386 sq mi or 247 acres) and river estuaries.

Lion-sur-Mer (French pronunciation: [ljɔ̃ syʁ mɛʁ], literally Lion on Sea) is a commune in the Calvados department in the Normandy region in northwestern France.

== Geography ==
Lion-sur-Mer is located on the edge of the English Channel, more precisely on the Côte de Nacre (Mother of Pearl Coast), about 15 km (9.3 mi) North of Caen.

The beach is made of fine sand and is bordered, to the west, by middle-sized cliffs.

The town is served by 2 bus services : line No. 1 of the Bus Verts du Calvados and line No. 62 of Twisto. A ferry of Brittany Ferries links Ouistreham (5 km from Lion-sur-Mer) to Portsmouth in England.

== History ==
- 6 June 1944 : The D-Day of the Battle of Normandy during World War II. British soldiers landed on the beach of Lion-sur-Mer which was a part of the Sword Beach sector.

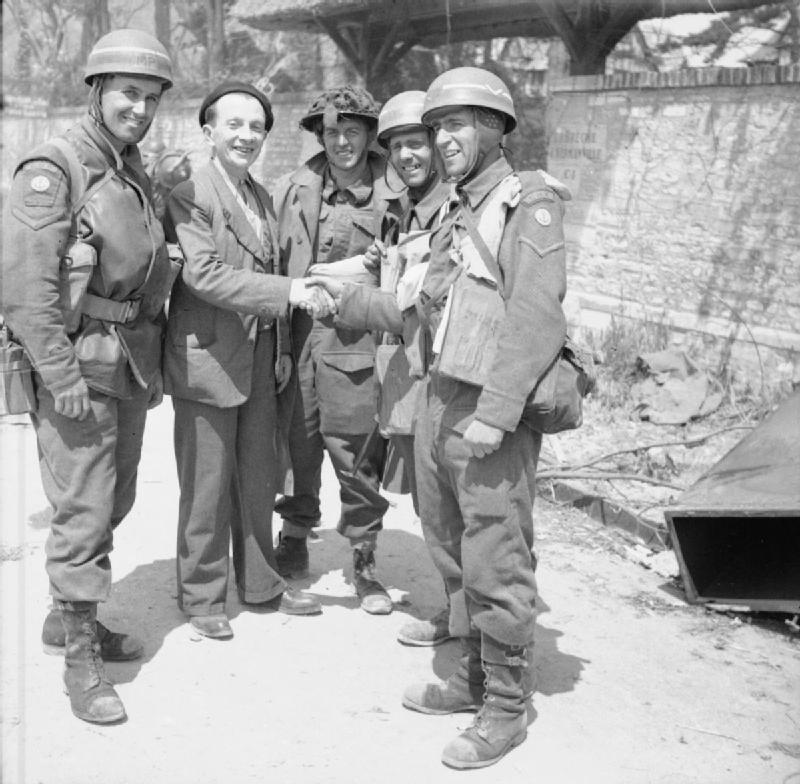
A French civilian greets British troops in Lion-sur-Mer, 6 June 1944.

== Population ==
Historical population
| Year | Pop. | ±% p.a. |
|---|---|---|
| 1968 | 1,613 | — |
| 1975 | 1,748 | +1.15% |
| 1982 | 1,823 | +0.60% |
| 1990 | 2,086 | +1.70% |
| 1999 | 2,401 | +1.57% |
| 2007 | 2,569 | +0.85% |
| 2012 | 2,568 | −0.01% |
| 2017 | 2,461 | −0.85% |
| 2023 | 2,486 | +0.17% |
Source: INSEE

== Sights ==
- The beach, its promenade (La digue) and its villas from the beginning of the 20th century
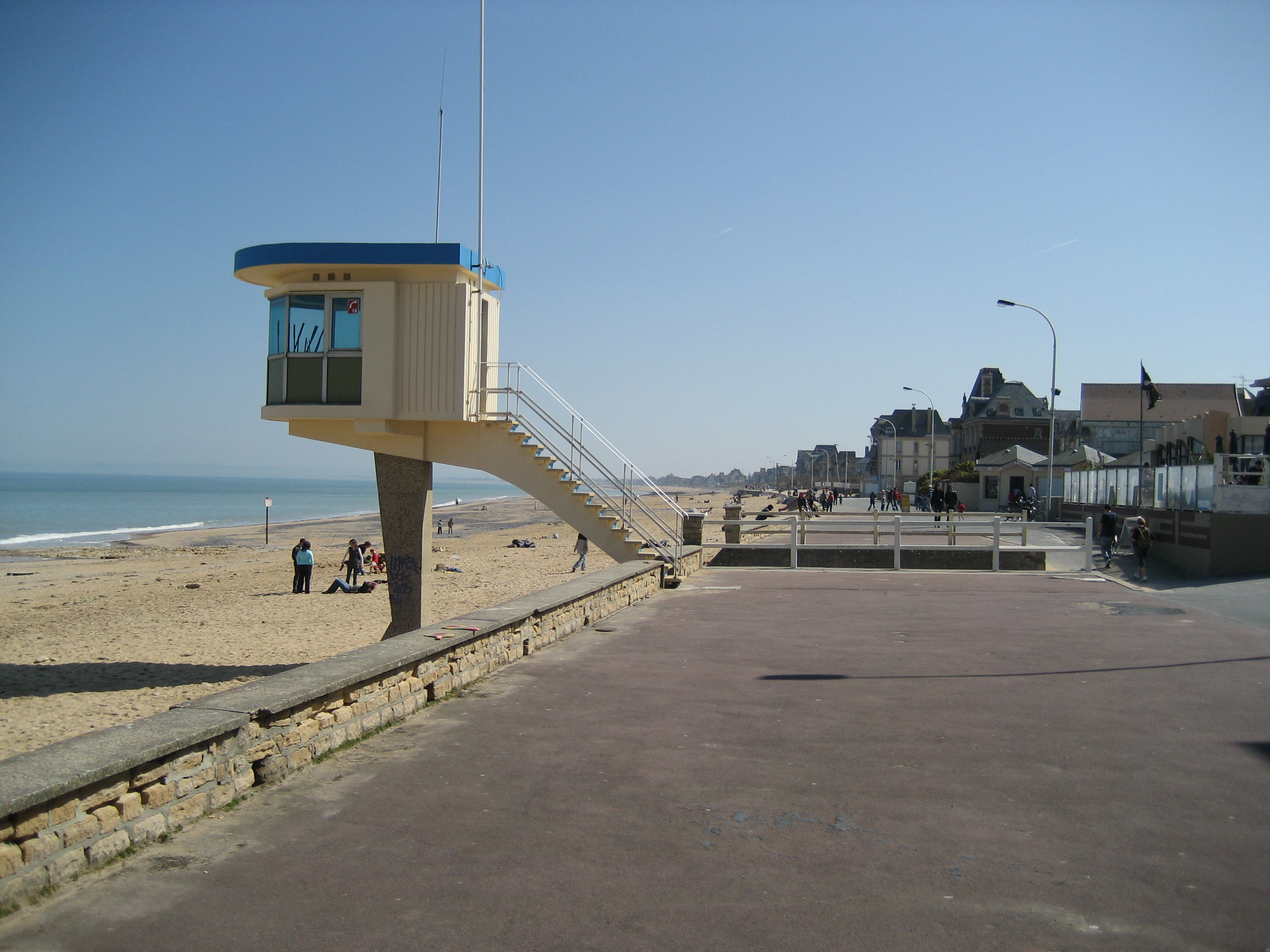
To the East, the beach with the promenade (in the foreground, the SNSM look-out post)

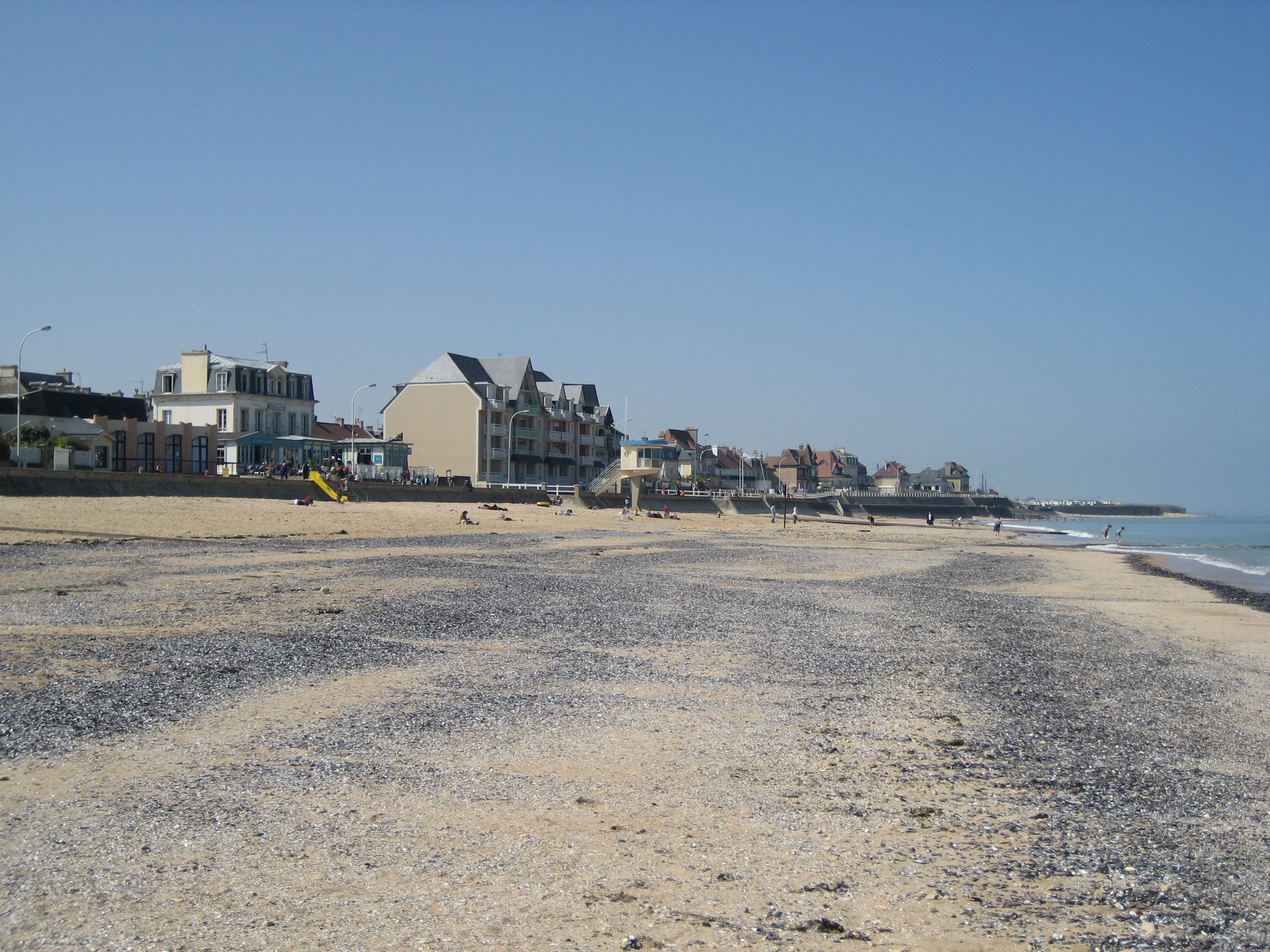
The promenade as seen from the beach

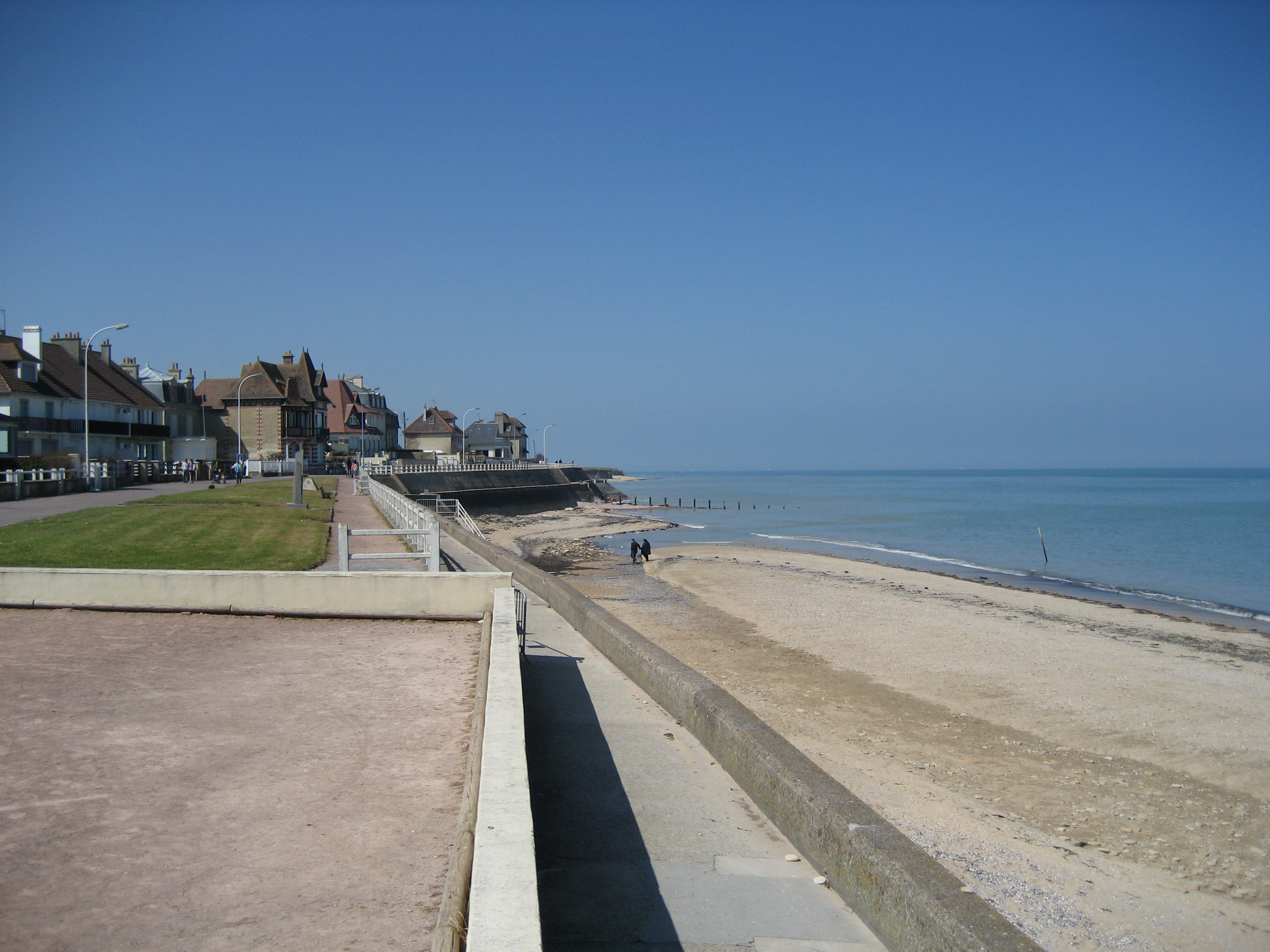
To the West, the coast with the cliffes in the background
- Saint-Pierre church (Tower from the 1st half of the 12th century)
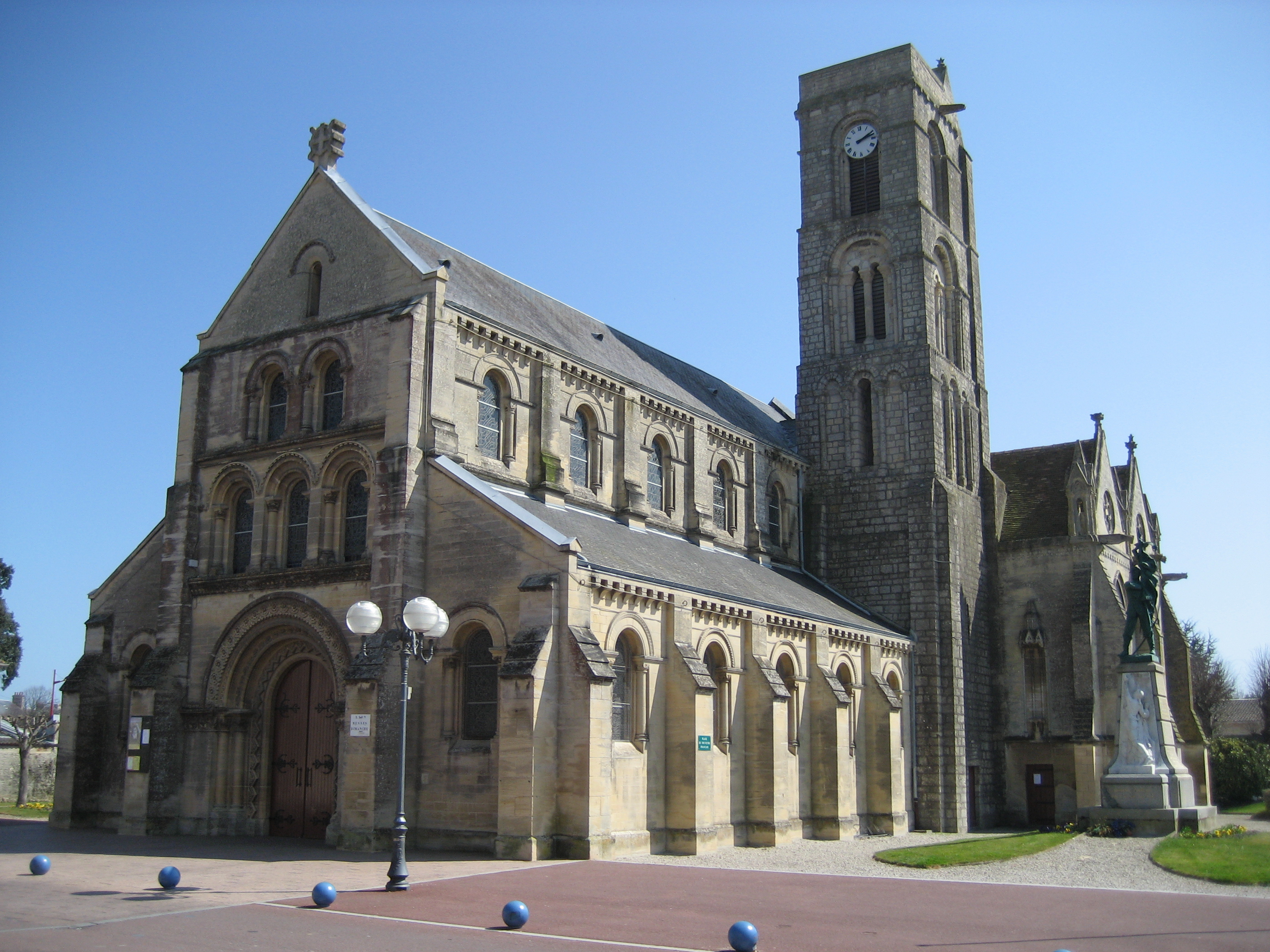
Façade of the church
- Lion-sur-Mer castle (Closed to the public)
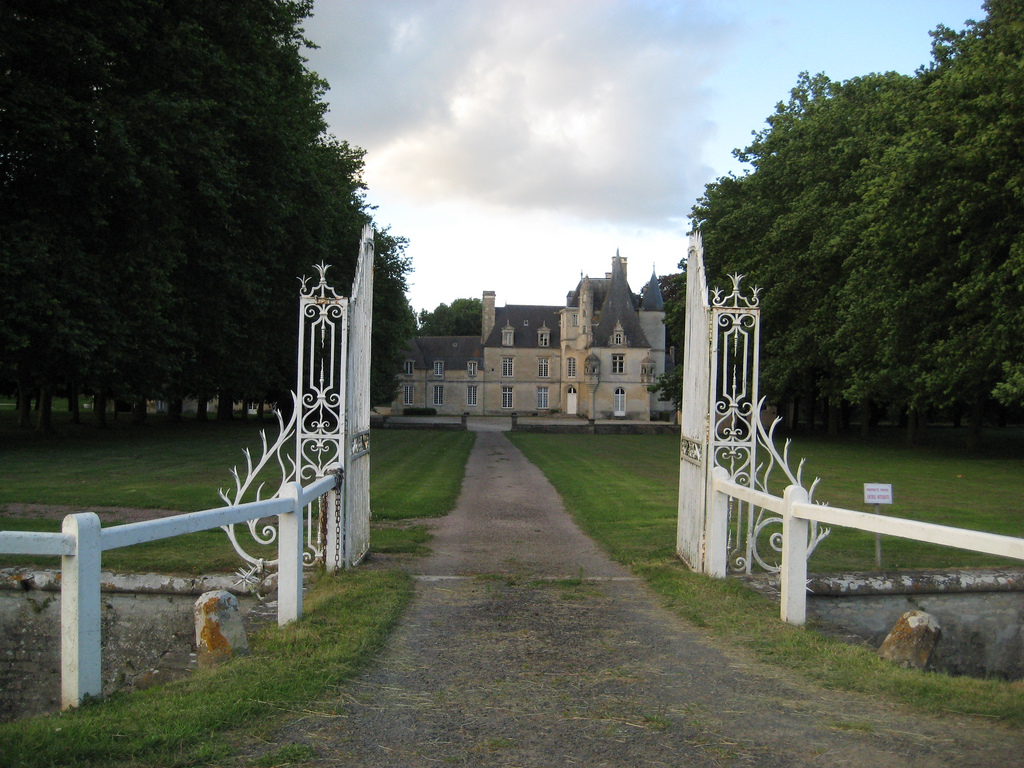
Front view of the castle
- The "le Castel Louis" or "la Villa Louis" house (listed building), ancient casino built in 1866–1868 and then transformed in the Art Nouveau style.
- The town is crossed by the EuroVelo 4 track.

== Events ==
- "Les terrasses de l'été" ("The summer terraces") : about 40 free animations and concerts in July and August.
- Flea markets several times per year.

== Sport ==
- Hermanville sporting club (8 tennis clay courts)
- Municipal sailing school
- Sport complex (Gymnasium, tennis courts and soccer field)

== International relations ==
Lion-sur-Mer is twinned with:

- Kiebingen in Baden-Württemberg, Germany

== See also ==
- Communes of the Calvados department

== Bibliography ==
- (in French) Villas de Lion-sur-Mer et Hermanville-sur-Mer, Coll. Itinéraires du patrimoine, n°125
