= Hermann Wittich =

German politician

Hermann Gottlieb Friedrich Wittich (May 26, 1826 – October 1, 1906) was a German politician and an honorary citizen of the city of Rottenburg.
