= Hermanville-sur-Mer =

- Commune
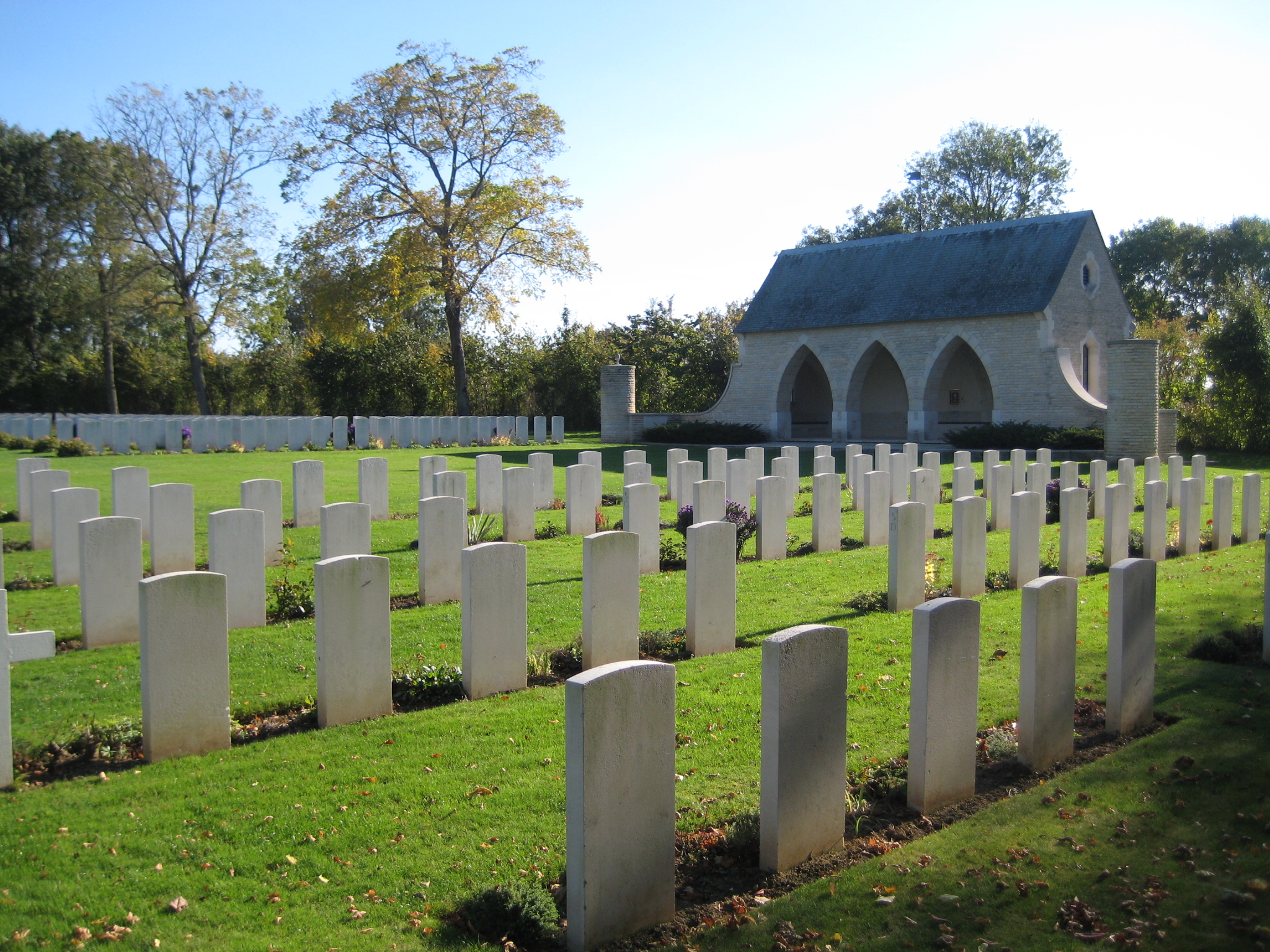
- WW II British cemetery

- Coat of arms
- Location of Hermanville-sur-Mer
- Location within France Location within Normandy
- Coordinates: 49°17′02″N 0°18′50″W
- Country: France
- Region: Normandy
- Department: Calvados
- Arrondissement: Caen
- Canton: Ouistreham
- Intercommunality: CU Caen la Mer

Government
  - Mayor (2020–2026): Pierre Schmit
- Area^{1}: 8.05 km^{2} (3.11 sq mi)
- Elevation: 25 m (82 ft)
- Highest elevation: 59 m (194 ft)
- Lowest elevation: 3 m (9.8 ft)
- Population (2023): 3,323
  - Density: 413/km^{2} (1,070/sq mi)
- Time zone: UTC+01:00 (CET)
  - Summer (DST): UTC+02:00 (CEST)
- INSEE/Postal code: 14325 /14880
- ^{1} French Land Register data, which excludes lakes, ponds, glaciers > 1 km^{2} (0.386 sq mi or 247 acres) and river estuaries.

Hermanville-sur-Mer (French pronunciation: [ɛʁmɑ̃vil syʁ mɛʁ]) is a commune in the Calvados department in the Normandy region in northwestern France.

== Population ==
Historical population

Year	Pop.	±% p.a.
1793	700	—
1800	642	−1.23%
1806	784	+3.39%
1821	799	+0.13%
1831	847	+0.59%
1836	864	+0.40%
1841	844	−0.47%
1846	879	+0.82%
1851	878	−0.02%
1856	822	−1.31%
1861	821	−0.02%
1866	776	−1.12%
1872	801	+0.53%
1876	790	−0.35%
1881	778	−0.31%
1886	715	−1.67%
1891	746	+0.85%
1896	705	−1.12%
1901	702	−0.09%

Year	Pop.	±% p.a.
1906	722	+0.56%
1911	747	+0.68%
1921	673	−1.04%
1926	612	−1.88%
1931	630	+0.58%
1936	630	+0.00%
1946	882	+3.42%
1954	1,037	+2.04%
1962	1,065	+0.33%
1968	1,160	+1.43%
1975	1,312	+1.77%
1982	1,753	+4.23%
1990	2,113	+2.36%
1999	2,661	+2.60%
2007	2,697	+0.17%
2012	2,801	+0.76%
2017	3,110	+2.11%
2023	3,323	+1.11%

Source: EHESS and INSEE (1968-2023)

== Sights ==
- 13th century church
- Commonwealth war cemetery
- Old village centre
- Villa la Bluette, an 1899 villa by architect Hector Guimard
- Villa La Houle
- Manoir de Prébois

== Normandy landings ==
The beach of Hermanville, part of the area codenamed Sword, was one of the targets of Operation Overlord on 6 June 1944. The Cod German stronghold was located on the coast. A Norwegian destroyer, the HNoMS Svenner, sank in front of Hermanville.

The sector at Hermanville was known as Queen Beach where elements of the British 3rd Division landed. The South Lancashire Regiment landed on Queen White and East Yorkshire Regiment on Queen Red; by 10:00 the village had been cleared. Offshore from Hermanville a Gooseberry was established, this consisted of a breakwater formed with ships sunk into position, including the French battleship Courbet.

== Twin towns ==
Hermanville is twinned with:

- (United Kingdom) Tangmere, England
- Nominingue, Canada, since 2002

== Personalities ==
Hermanville-sur-Mer was the birthplace of:

- Jean François Sarrazin (1611?–1654), author
- Alain Touraine (born 1925), sociologist

== See also ==
- Communes of the Calvados department
