= Weiler (Rottenburg) =

- Part of Rottenburg am Neckar
- Coat of arms
- Interactive map of Weiler
- Location within Germany Location within Baden-Württemberg
- Coordinates: 48°26′53″N 08°55′10″E
- Country: Germany
- State: Baden-Württemberg
- Admin. region: Tübingen
- District: Tübingen
- Town: Rottenburg am Neckar

Government
  - Mayor: Jochen Magner

Area
  - Total: 3.84 km^{2} (1.48 sq mi)
- Elevation: 373–558 m (1,224–1,831 ft)

Population (2018)
  - Total: 1,065
  - Density: 277/km^{2} (718/sq mi)
- Time zone: UTC+01:00 (CET)
  - Summer (DST): UTC+02:00 (CEST)
- Postal codes: 72108
- Dialling codes: (+49) 07472
- Vehicle registration: TÜ
- Website: www.rottenburg.de

Weiler (German pronunciation: [ˈvaɪlɐ]) is a suburban district of Rottenburg am Neckar in the administrative district of Tübingen in Baden-Württemberg (Germany).

== Geography ==
Weiler is located 4 km (2.48 mi) southern from Rottenburg am Neckar on a plateau with an elevation from 373 to 558 m.

=== Extent ===
The area of the district is 384 hectares. Thereof fall 53.3% upon agriculturally used area, 35.5% upon forest area, 10.3% upon settlement area and roads, 0.3% upon water expanse and 0.5% upon other.

== Population ==
Weiler has 1081 residents (31/01/08) At an area of 3.84 km² (1.5 sq mi) this corresponds to a population density of 282 people per km², or 729 per sq mi.

=== Faiths ===
Most of the population is Roman Catholic.
