= Oberndorf (Rottenburg) =

- Part of Rottenburg am Neckar
- Coat of arms
- Interactive map of Oberndorf
- Location within Germany Location within Baden-Württemberg
- Coordinates: 48°31′35″N 08°55′48″E
- Country: Germany
- State: Baden-Württemberg
- Admin. region: Tübingen
- District: Tübingen
- Town: Rottenburg am Neckar

Government
  - Mayor: Karl Schneck

Area
  - Total: 6.14 km^{2} (2.37 sq mi)
- Elevation: 280–485 m (919–1,591 ft)

Population (2018)
  - Total: 1,492
  - Density: 243/km^{2} (629/sq mi)
- Time zone: UTC+01:00 (CET)
  - Summer (DST): UTC+02:00 (CEST)
- Postal codes: 72108
- Dialling codes: (+49) 07073
- Vehicle registration: TÜ
- Website: www.rottenburg.de

Oberndorf (German: [ˈoːbɐndɔʁf]) is a suburban district of Rottenburg am Neckar in the administrative district of Tübingen in Baden-Württemberg (Germany).

== Geography ==
Oberndorf is located 6 km (3.7 mi) northern from Rottenburg, 10 km (6.2 mi) western from Tübingen and 14 km (8.7 mi) southeastern from Herrenberg.

=== Extent ===
Oberdorf has a territory of 614 hectares. Thereof fall 70.1% upon agriculturally used area, 15.7% upon forest area, 13.7% upon settlement area and roads, 0.2% upon water expanse and 0.3% upon other.

== Population ==
1466 people live in Oberndorf (31/01/08). It is one of the larger suburbs of Rottenburg. At an area of 6.14 km^{2} (2.4 sq mi) this corresponds to a population density of 239 people per km^{2}, or 618 per sq mi.

=== Faiths ===
The population is predominantly Roman Catholic.
