= Wurmlingen (Rottenburg) =

- Stadtteil of Rottenburg am Neckar
- Coat of arms
- Interactive map of Wurmlingen
- Location within Germany Location within Baden-Württemberg
- Coordinates: 48°30′08″N 08°57′55″E
- Country: Germany
- State: Baden-Württemberg
- Admin. region: Tübingen
- District: Tübingen
- Town: Rottenburg am Neckar

Government
  - Mayor: Hans-Dieter Bauschert

Area
  - Total: 7.14 km^{2} (2.76 sq mi)
- Elevation: 335–475 m (1,099–1,558 ft)

Population (2018)
  - Total: 2,600
  - Density: 360/km^{2} (940/sq mi)
- Time zone: UTC+01:00 (CET)
  - Summer (DST): UTC+02:00 (CEST)
- Postal codes: 72108
- Dialling codes: (+49) 07472
- Vehicle registration: TÜ
- Website: www.rottenburg.de

Wurmlingen (pronounced [ˈvʊʁmlɪŋən]) is a suburban district of Rottenburg am Neckar in the administrative district of Tübingen in Baden-Württemberg (Germany). It is famous for its chapel, located atop a hill, which is the subject of a famous poem by Ludwig Uhland.

== Geography ==
Wurmlingen is located 4 km (2.5 mi) northeastern from Rottenburg and 8 km (5 mi) southwestern from Tübingen in valley of the Neckar.

=== Extent ===
The area of the district is 714 hectares. Thereof fall 68.6% upon agriculturally used area, 15.1% upon forest area, 15.1% upon settlement area and roads, 0.1% upon water expanse and 1.1% upon other.

=== Neighbour localities ===
The territories of the following localities adjoin to Wurmlingen, they are called clockwise beginning in the north: Unterjesingen, Hirschau, Rottenburg (Town), Wendelsheim. All bordering localities are in the administrative district of Tübingen. Unterjesingen and Hirschau are suburban districts of Tübingen, Wendelsheim belongs to Rottenburg.

== Population ==
Wurmlingen has 2487 residents (31/01/08). It is the second largest suburb of Rottenburg. At an area of 7.14 km² (2.8 sq mi) this corresponds to a population density of 348 people per km², or 902 per sq mi.

=== Faiths ===
The population is predominantly Roman Catholic.
