= Ergenzingen =

- Part of Rottenburg am Neckar
- Coat of arms
- Interactive map of Ergenzingen
- Location within Germany Location within Baden-Württemberg
- Coordinates: 48°29′38″N 08°48′32″E
- Country: Germany
- State: Baden-Württemberg
- Admin. region: Tübingen
- District: Tübingen
- Town: Rottenburg am Neckar

Government
  - Mayor: Hans Beser

Area
  - Total: 10.04 km^{2} (3.88 sq mi)
- Elevation: 436–499 m (1,430–1,637 ft)

Population (2019-12-31)
  - Total: 4,376
  - Density: 435.9/km^{2} (1,129/sq mi)
- Time zone: UTC+01:00 (CET)
  - Summer (DST): UTC+02:00 (CEST)
- Postal codes: 72108
- Dialling codes: (+49) 07457
- Vehicle registration: TÜ
- Website: www.rottenburg.de

Ergenzingen is a suburban district of Rottenburg am Neckar in the administrative district of Tübingen in Baden-Württemberg (Germany).

== Geography ==
Ergenzingen is located 12 km (7.45 mi) western from Rottenburg am Neckar, 11 km (6.83 mi) southeastern from Nagold and 13 km (8.07 mi) northeastern from Horb am Neckar. The elevation is 436 to 499 m.

=== Extent ===
The territory of the district is 1004 hectares. Thereof fall 70.4% upon agriculturally used area, 11% upon forest area, 18.3% upon settlement area and roads and 0.3% upon other.

== Population ==
The population of Ergenzingen counts 4166 people (31/01/08). So Ergenzingen is the largest district of Rottenburg. At an area of 10.04 km^{2} (3.9 sq mi) this corresponds to a population density of 415 people per km^{2}, or 1,075 per sq mi.

=== Faiths ===
The population of the village is predominantly Roman Catholic.

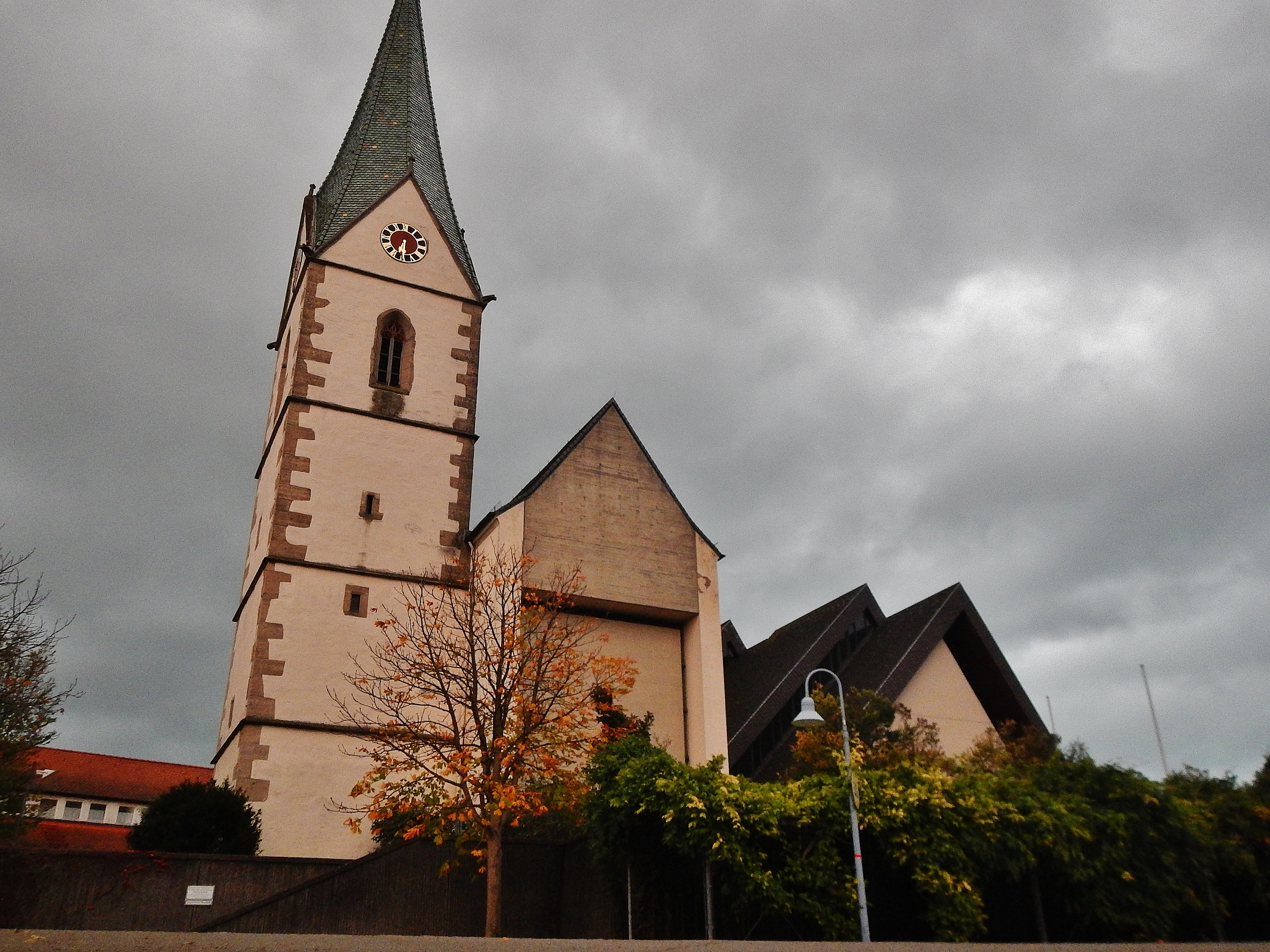
Catholic church Heilig Geist in Ergenzingen

== Politics ==
=== Sister villages ===
- Gols (Austria) since 2000
