= Bühl (Tübingen) =

Coordinates: 48°29′00″N 8°59′49″E

Bühl (German pronunciation: [byːl]) is a village in the Tübingen district in Baden-Württemberg, Germany. Since 1971, it is an outer district of the city of Tübingen.

Bühl has a population of 2 194 on an area of 6,41 km². It lies on the southern bank of the Neckar river, directly adjacent to the east to Kilchberg, 4 km to the east of Rottenburg am Neckar and about 6 km to the southwest of the inner city of Tübingen.
