= La Bluette =

Normandy villa

Coordinates: 49.299°N 0.305°W

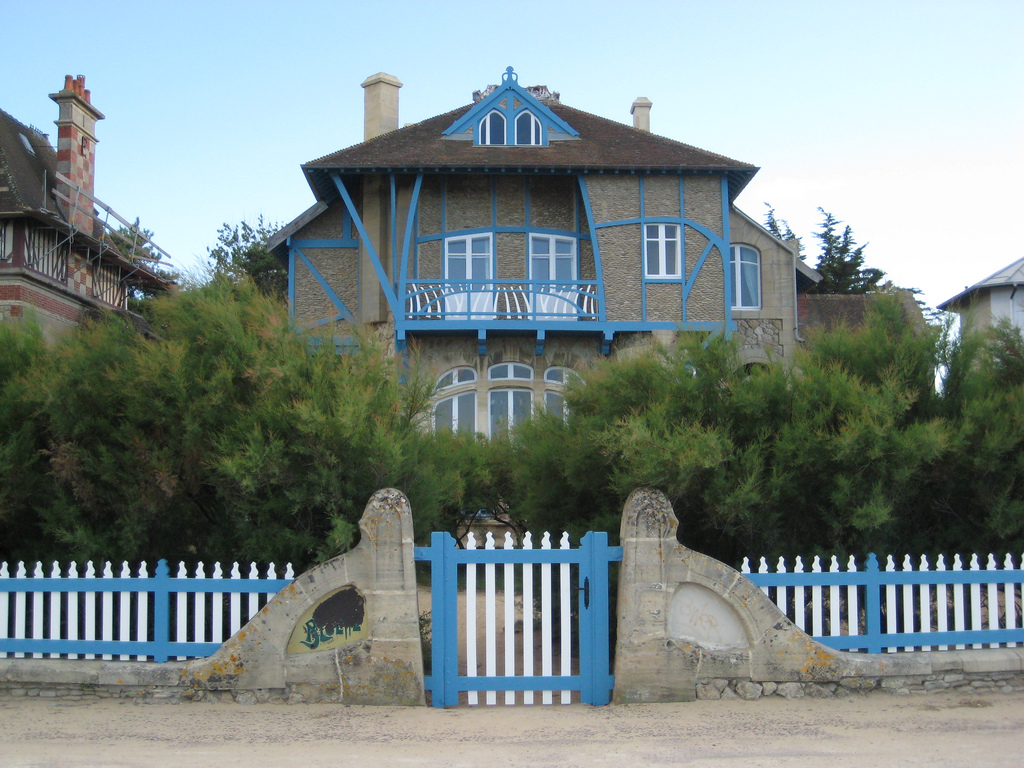
The villa La Bluette

La Bluette is a villa in Hermanville-sur-Mer by French architect Hector Guimard. It is one of the few remaining early works of Guimard and one of the few monuments of the Art Nouveau style in Calvados, Normandy. It was built in 1899 for Prosper Grivelle, a Parisian lawyer.

== Location ==
The house is located at 272 Rue du Pré de l'Isle, in Hermanville-sur-Mer, Calvados, Normandy, a seaside hamlet of 3,100 (at the 2017 census) in north-western France.

== Description ==
The house is built from limestone, pebble and a wooden timber frame. The wooden parts are painted in blue. The roof is crowned by a ceramic wave. The interior contains a large art nouveau staircase.

== Documents ==
A plan of the ground floor by Guimard is in the Musée d'Orsay.
