= Seebronn =

- Part of Rottenburg am Neckar
- Coat of arms
- Interactive map of Seebronn
- Location within Germany Location within Baden-Württemberg
- Coordinates: 48°30′28″N 08°52′36″E
- Country: Germany
- State: Baden-Württemberg
- Admin. region: Tübingen
- District: Tübingen
- Town: Rottenburg am Neckar

Government
  - Mayor: Ute Hahn

Area
  - Total: 8.11 km^{2} (3.13 sq mi)
- Elevation: 410–473 m (1,345–1,552 ft)

Population (2018)
  - Total: 1,705
  - Density: 210/km^{2} (545/sq mi)
- Time zone: UTC+01:00 (CET)
  - Summer (DST): UTC+02:00 (CEST)
- Postal codes: 72108
- Dialling codes: (+49) 07457
- Vehicle registration: TÜ
- Website: www.rottenburg.de

Seebronn is a suburban district of Rottenburg am Neckar in the administrative district of Tübingen in Baden-Württemberg (Germany).

== Geography ==
Seebronn is located 7 km (4.4 mi) northwestern from Rottenburg am Neckar.

=== Extent ===
The area of the district is 811 hectares. Thereof fall 73.0% upon agriculturally used area, 13.9% upon forest area, 11.8% upon settlement area and roads and 1.3% upon other.

== Population ==
Seebronn has 1714 residents (31/01/08). At an area of 7.51 km² (2.9 sq mi) this corresponds to a population density of 211 people per km², or 547 per sq mi.

=== Faiths ===
Seebronn is predominantly Roman Catholic.
