= Rottenburg am Neckar =

Town in Baden-Württemberg, Germany

- Town
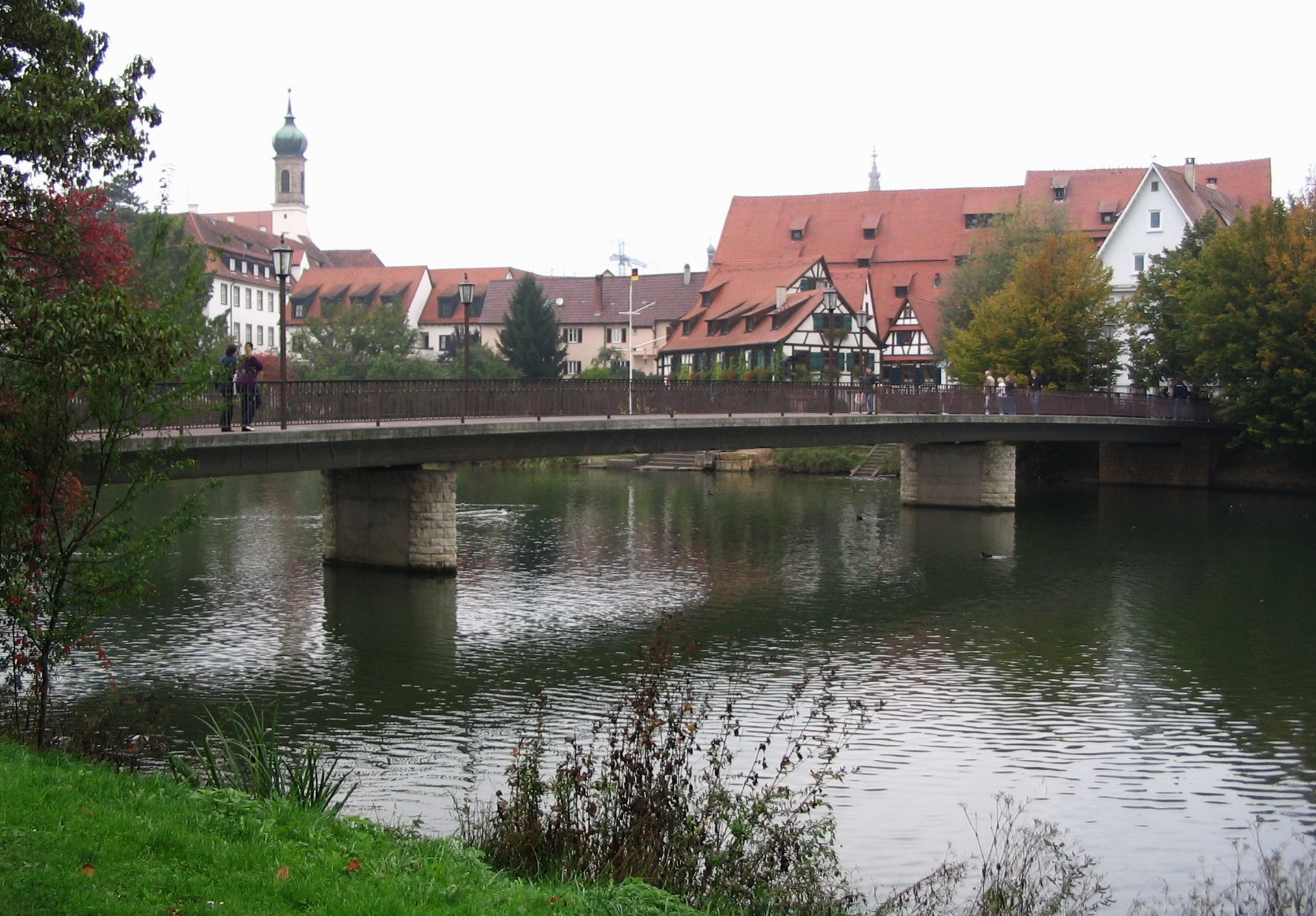
- River Neckar in Rottenburg

- Coat of arms

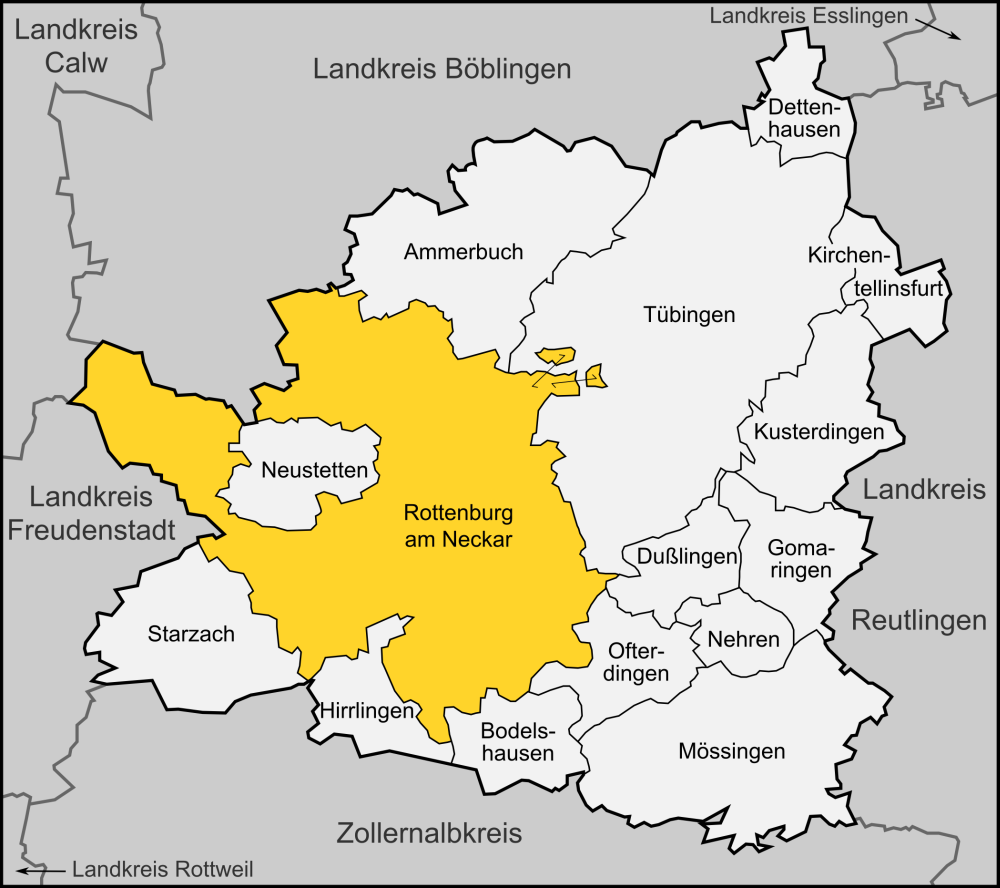
- Location of Rottenburg am Neckar within Tübingen district
- Interactive map of Rottenburg am Neckar
- Location within Germany Location within Baden-Württemberg
- Coordinates: 48°28′38″N 08°56′04″E
- Country: Germany
- State: Baden-Württemberg
- Admin. region: Tübingen
- District: Tübingen

Government
  - Mayor (2024–32): Stephan Neher

Area
  - Total: 142.26 km^{2} (54.93 sq mi)
- Elevation: 349 m (1,145 ft)

Population (2025-12-31)
  - Total: 45,579
  - Density: 320.39/km^{2} (829.81/sq mi)
- Time zone: UTC+01:00 (CET)
  - Summer (DST): UTC+02:00 (CEST)
- Postal codes: 72101–72108
- Dialling codes: 07472, 07478, 07457, 07073
- Vehicle registration: TÜ
- Website: www.rottenburg.de

Rottenburg am Neckar (German: [ˈʁɔtn̩bʊʁk ʔam ˈnɛkaʁ], lit. 'Rottenburg on the Neckar'; until 10 July 1964 only Rottenburg; Swabian: Raodaburg) is a medium-sized town in the administrative district (Landkreis) of Tübingen in Baden-Württemberg, Germany. It lies about 50 kilometres (31 miles) southwest of the provincial capital Stuttgart and about 12 km (7 mi) southwest of the district town Tübingen. Rottenburg is the second-largest town of the district after Tübingen and makes up a secondary centre for the surrounding community. Since 1 May 1972, Rottenburg am Neckar has been a district town (Große Kreisstadt). Rottenburg agreed to an administrative collective with the municipalities of Hirrlingen, Neustetten and Starzach.

Rottenburg is the seat of a Roman Catholic bishop, being the official centre of the diocese of Rottenburg-Stuttgart. Moreover, it has a college of church music and a university of applied sciences (German Fachhochschule), specialising in forestry.

== Geography ==
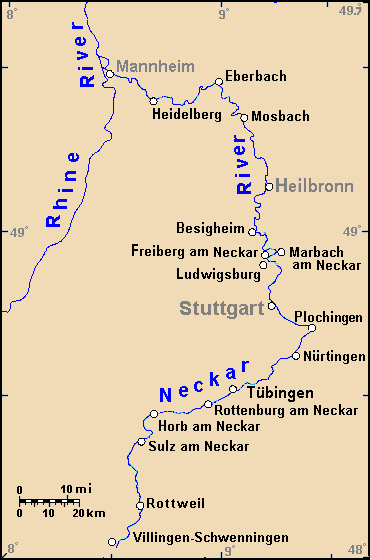
Rottenburg am Neckar on Neckar River

Rottenburg is divided into a town core and seventeen (suburban) districts.

Suburban districts of Rottenburg: Bad Niedernau, Baisingen, Bieringen, Dettingen, Eckenweiler, Ergenzingen, Frommenhausen, Hailfingen, Hemmendorf, Kiebingen, Obernau, Oberndorf, Schwalldorf, Seebronn, Weiler, Wendelsheim and Wurmlingen.

== History ==
Rottenburg was founded as a Roman town, Sumelocenna, probably around the year AD98, and was one of the most important Roman towns in the southwest of Germany. It had a line of walls built to defend it from the attacks of the Alamanni, who nevertheless destroyed it in 259-260.

The name Rottenburg is thought to derive from a Germanic root that is also present in the English word "rotten", in an older meaning of "destroyed". According to this hypothesis, the town would have received its name when, in the early Middle Ages, Alemannic people founded their settlement in the vicinity of the ruins of Roman Sumelocenna. An alternative etymology of Rottenburg as "red borough" is also considered possible, however.

In the Middle Ages, the town was first governed by the counts of Hohenberg, who, however, were forced to sell it to the Habsburg dynasty in 1381. Rottenburg remained a part of Further Austria until 1805, when it was assigned to Württemberg in the Peace of Pressburg.

Rottenburg became the seat of a Catholic bishop as late as 1821–1828, when, after the secularisation and the Napoleonic Wars, a reorganisation of Catholic life in southwest Germany had become necessary. It was then decided not to choose the more important nearby places of Stuttgart or Tübingen as a diocesan town, as these were firmly Protestant.

Rottenburg is known among Anabaptists as the place of death for Michael Sattler, a former monk who was involved in missionary activities in the Rottenburg and Horb am Neckar region. Sattler was burned at the stake on "Gallows Hill" on 20 May 1527.

== Main sights ==
Dom St. Martin has been the town's cathedral since 1821. Its tower, dating from 1486, is its most prominent feature.

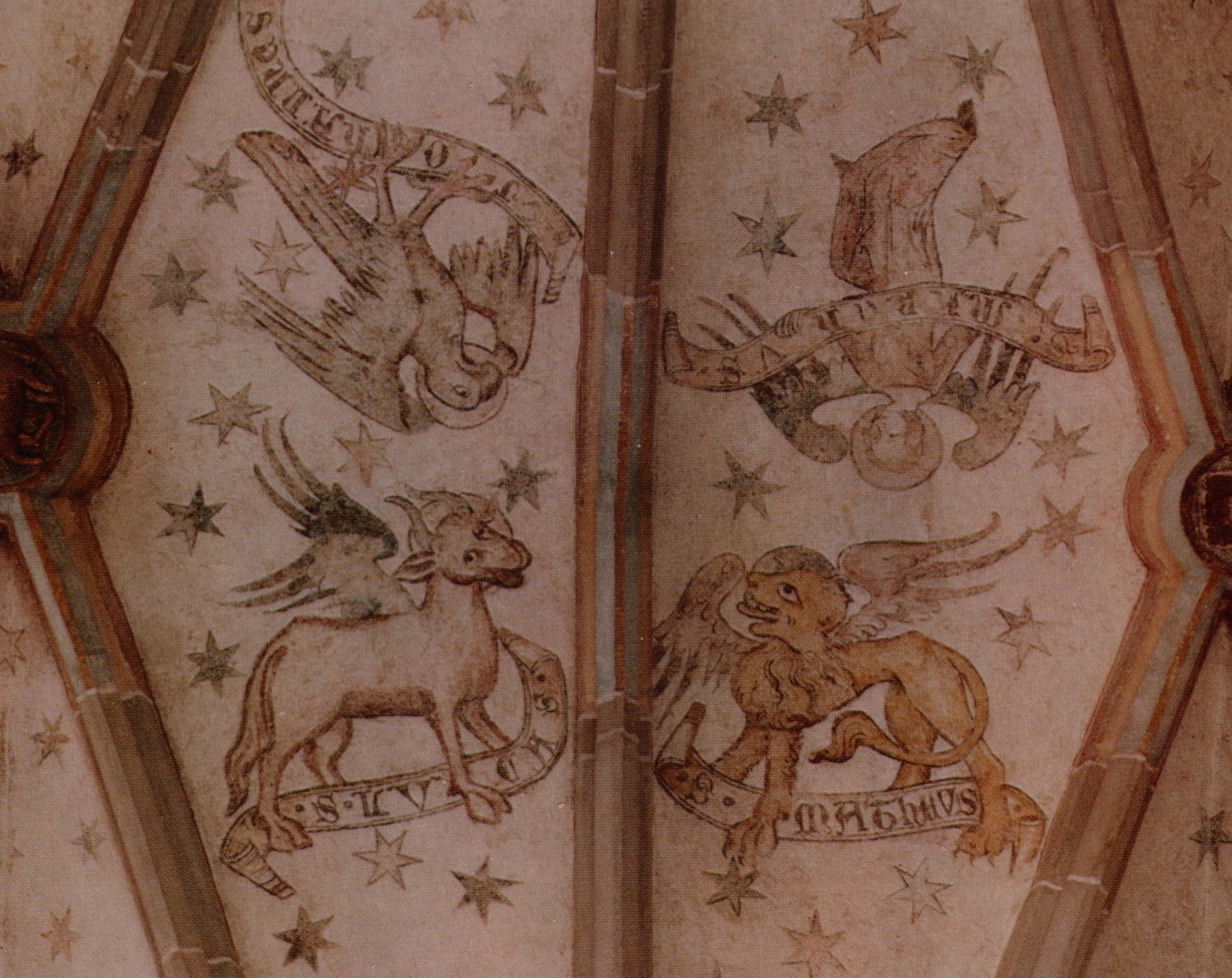
The Four Evangelists (15th century) on the choir ceiling of Stiftskirche St. Moriz

Spanning various architectural periods, the Stiftskirche St. Moriz incorporates a Gothic core with elements from an earlier church and a later Baroque hall church. The Gothic feel is what persists, from 14th- and 15th-century frescoes on the pillars to the 15th-century painting of the Four Evangelists on the ceiling in the choir. In the north aisle stands an ornamented column depicting various princes, donated in 1470 by Archduchess Mechthild, the wife of Ludwig I and mother of Eberhard I. A copy also stands in the town's Marktplatz.

There are two museums in town, the Sülchgau Museum, specialising in pre- and early history and Roman influences on the area, and the diocesan museum, focusing on ecclesiastical art, painting and sculpture.

In nearby Weggental is the pilgrimage church of Wallfahrtskirche St. Maria, rebuilt in 1682–1695 in Baroque style, but containing a medieval pietà and a very fine rendition of the Virgin swooning during the Deposition of Christ from the cross.

A more modern landmark is the Eckenweiler Water Tower. Built of reinforced concrete in the 1970s, its unusual design, a cube supported by a rectangular column, is notable.

== Twin towns – sister cities ==
Rottenburg am Neckar is twinned with:

- Ablis, France
- Gols, Austria
- Lion-sur-Mer, France
- Saint-Claude, France
- Yalova, Turkey

== Notable people ==
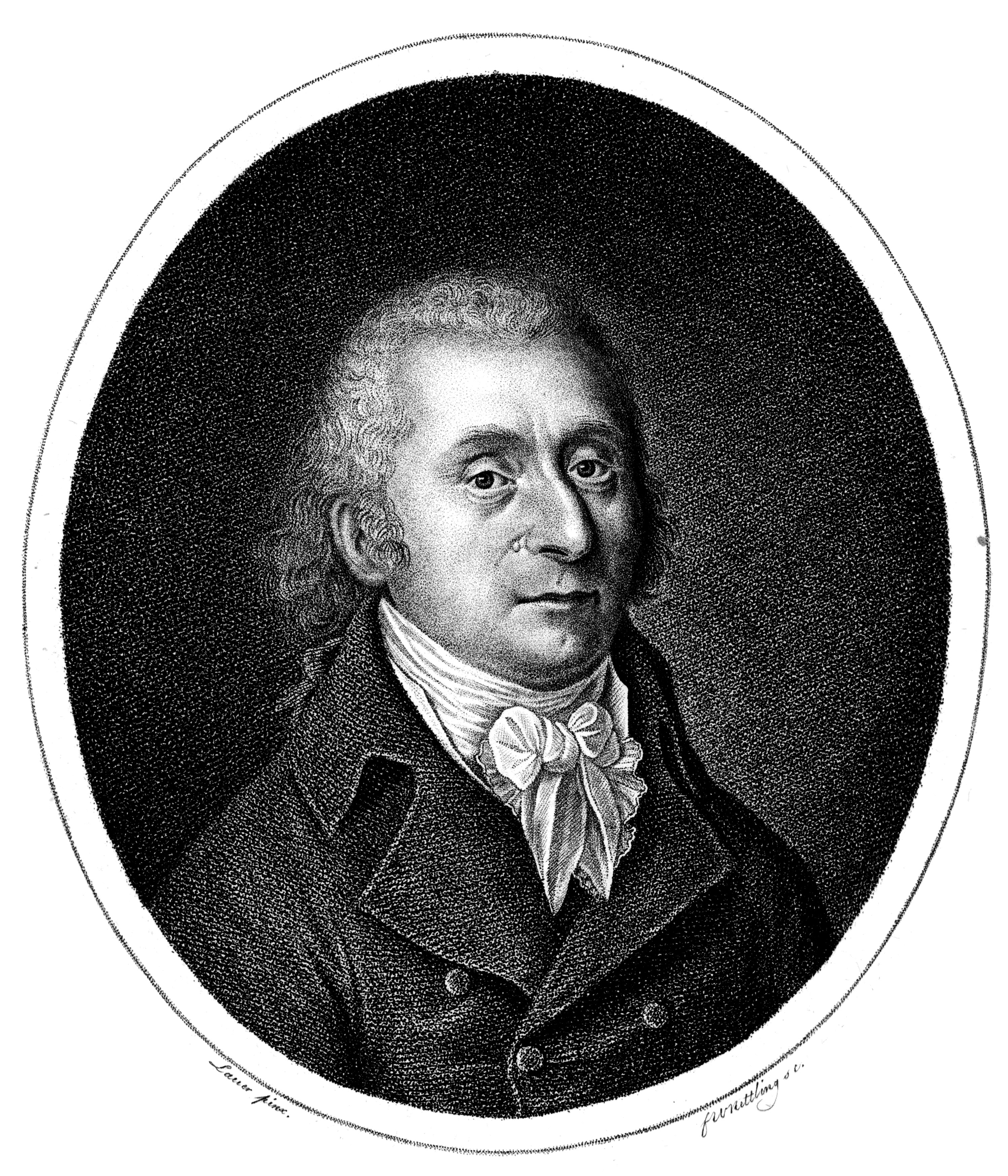
Franz Anton Hoffmeister in 1804

- Johann Baptist von Keller (1774–1845), a Catholic priest and the first Bishop of Rottenburg
- Franz Anton Hoffmeister (1754–1812), composer and music publisher
- Karl Josef von Hefele (1809–1893), Bishop of Rottenburg and theologian, died locally.
- Ottilie Wildermuth (1817–1877), author of children's books
- Eugen Bolz (1881–1945), politician (Zentrum) and member of the resistance to Nazism
- Winfried Hermann (born 1952), politician (Greens), since 2011 Minister for Transport in Baden-Württemberg
- Knut Kircher (born 1969), football referee, lives here

== Honorary citizens ==
The town of Rottenburg am Neckar and respectively the former municipalities, which have been incorporated, have awarded the honorary citizenship to the following persons:

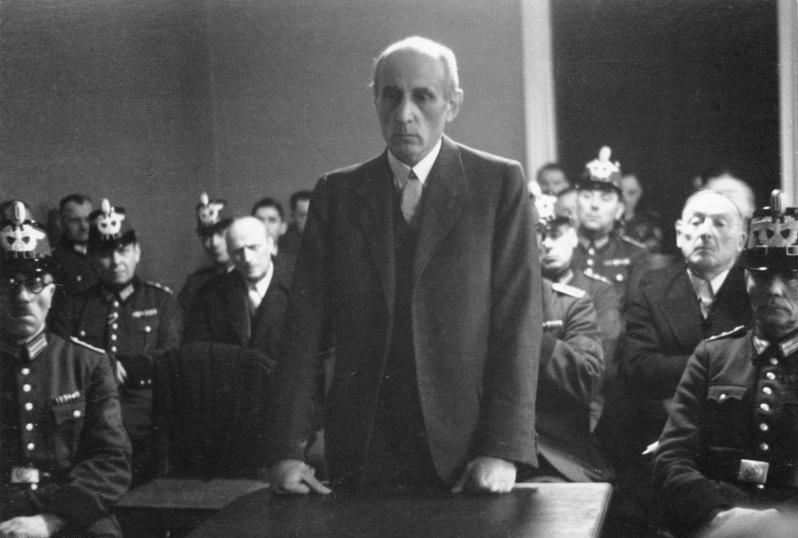
Eugen Bolz in 1944

Rottenburg

- 1901: Hermann Friedrich Wittich, Regierungsrat
- 1904: Gustav Holzherr, independent gentleman
- 1909: Karl Bitzenauer, parish priest of the town
- 1924: Paul Wilhelm von Keppler, Bishop of Rottenburg
- 1930: Karl Landsee, merchant
- 1931: Alois Kremmler, Oberstudiendirektor (principal)
- 1931: Eugen Bolz (1881–1945 (executed in Berlin-Plötzensee), politician and member of the resistance to Nazism
- 1947: Joannes Baptista Sproll, Bishop of Rottenburg
- 1947: Max Kottmann, vicar general
- 1949: Josef Schneider, Mayor of Rottenburg and Kanzleidirektor (retired)
- 1958: Franz Anton Buhl, schoolmaster and local historian
- 1961: Josef Eberle, poet and publisher
- 1967: Alfred Planck, entrepreneur
- 1968: Carl Joseph Leiprecht, Bishop of Rottenburg
- 2003: Winfried Löffler, Lord Mayor of Rottenburg (retired)
- 2008: Walter Kasper, Bishop of Rottenburg-Stuttgart and Cardinal of the Roman Curia

Bad Niedernau

- 1891: Kilian von Steiner, banker

Ergenzingen

- 1919: Hieronymus Baur, Mayor of Ergenzingen (retired)
- 1961: Alfons Leykauf, parish priest
- 1965: Maximilian Schier, schoolmaster

Frommenhausen

- ?: Rudolf Franziskus de Paula Joseph Fidel Freiherr von Wagner, Warminister of Württemberg
- 1908: Ludwig Franz Freiherr von Wagner, Lieutenant General

Kiebingen

- 1938: Karl Franz Ferdinand Viktor Osterwald, factory manager of the power station

Obernau

- ?: Ignaz Kleiner, parish priest
- 1947: Otto Heine, parish priest

Wurmlingen

- 1905: Sebastian Bauer, dean
- 1953: Franz Josef Fischer, auxiliary bishop
- 1968: Stefan Kruschina, parish priest

== Gallery ==
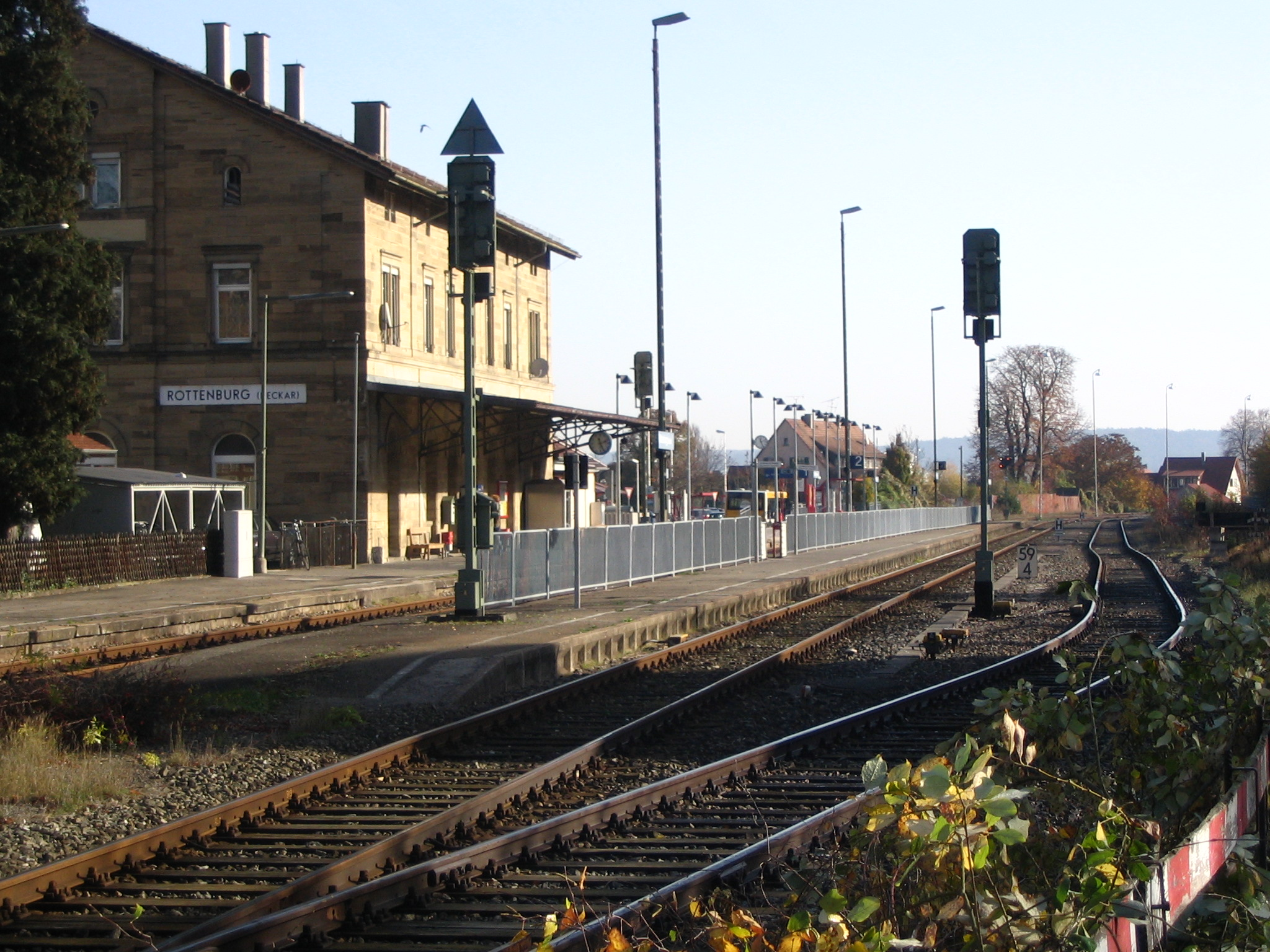
Railway station in Rottenburg

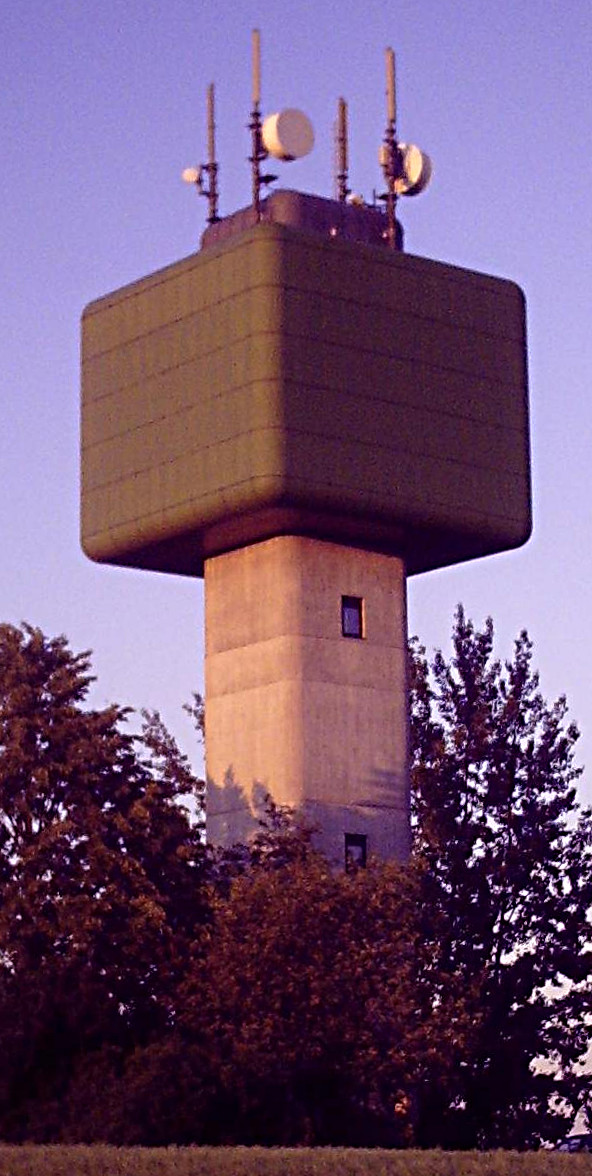
Eckenweiler water tower

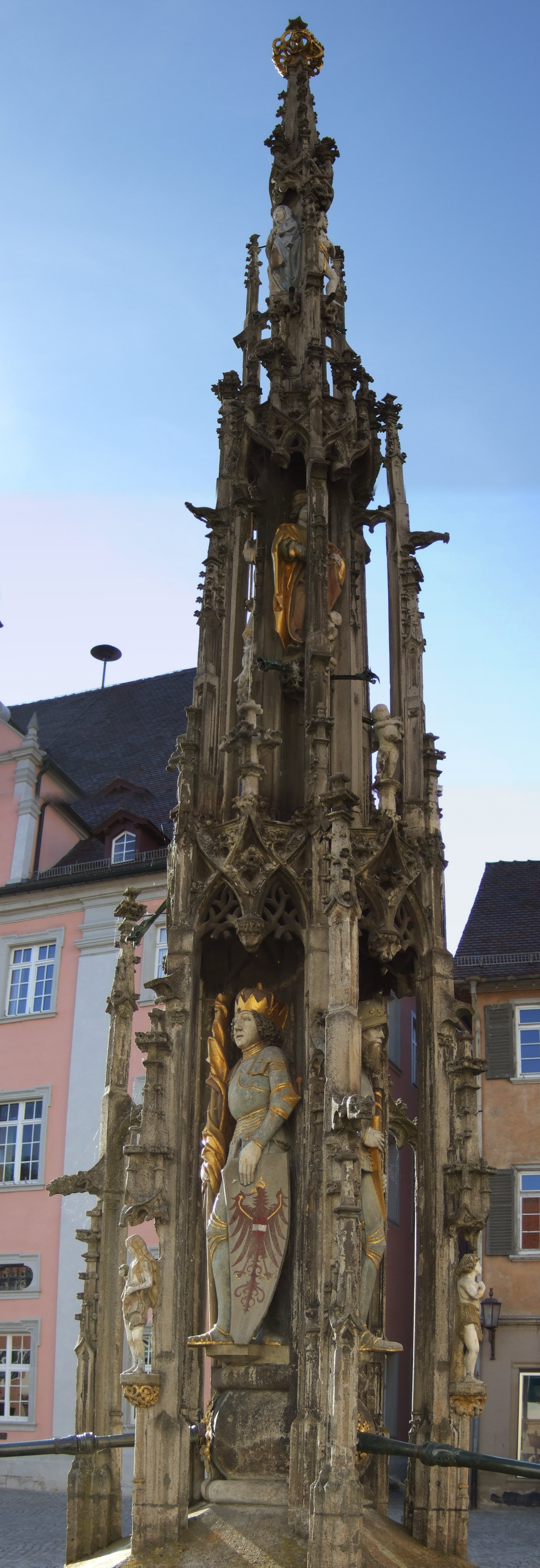
Gothic fountain

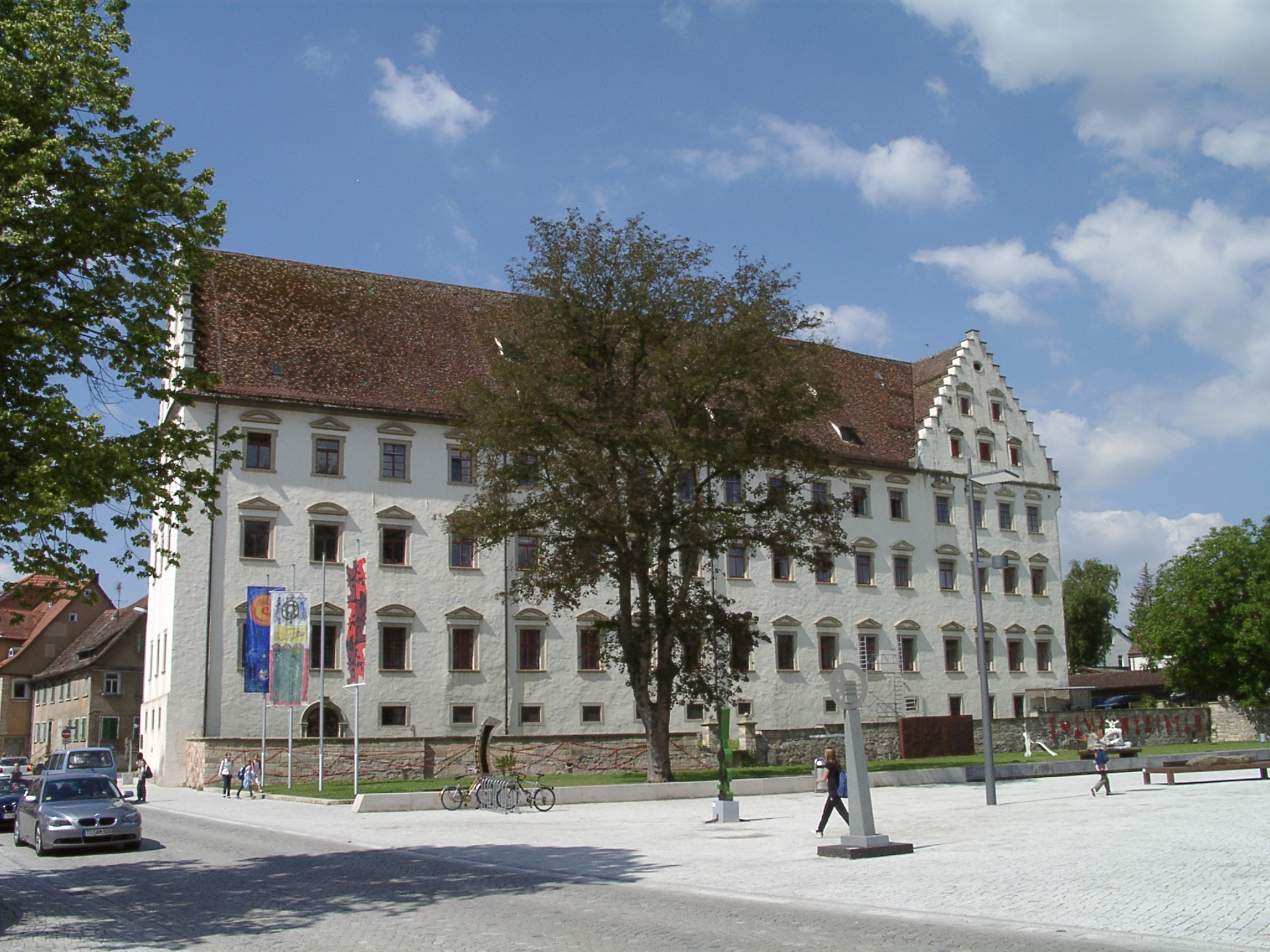
Episcopal Palace at the Eugen-Bolz-Square
