= Bad Friedrichshall =

- Town
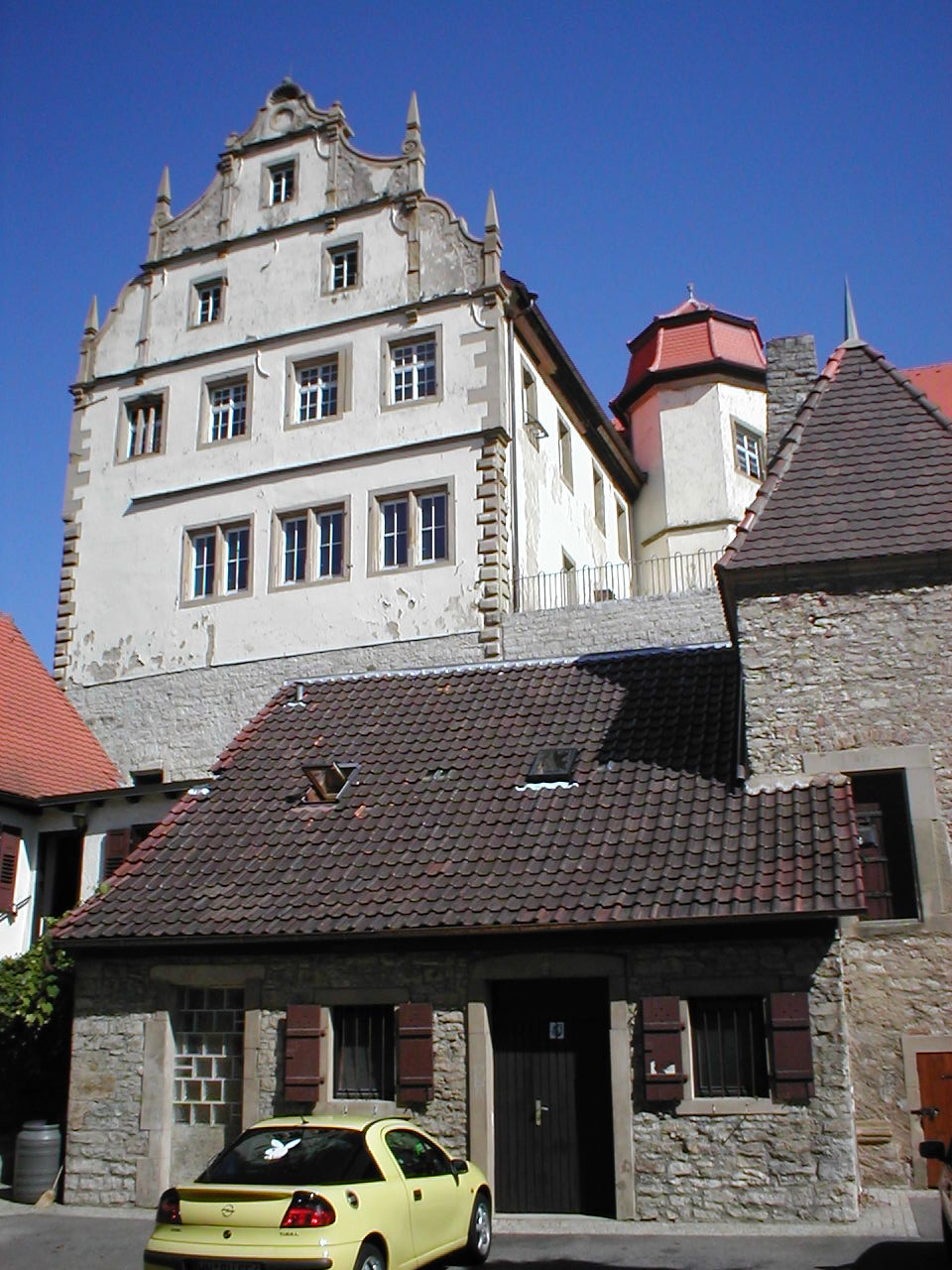
- Kochendorf castle

- Coat of arms

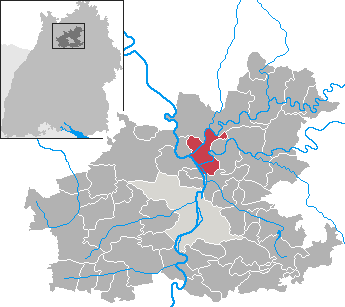
- Location of Bad Friedrichshall within Heilbronn district
- Interactive map of Bad Friedrichshall
- Location within Germany Location within Baden-Württemberg
- Coordinates: 49°14′N 9°13′E
- Country: Germany
- State: Baden-Württemberg
- Admin. region: Stuttgart
- District: Heilbronn
- Subdivisions: 6

Government
  - Mayor (2023–31): Timo Frey

Area
  - Total: 24.71 km^{2} (9.54 sq mi)
- Elevation: 167 m (548 ft)

Population (2025-12-31)
  - Total: 19,910
  - Density: 805.7/km^{2} (2,087/sq mi)
- Time zone: UTC+01:00 (CET)
  - Summer (DST): UTC+02:00 (CEST)
- Postal codes: 74177
- Dialling codes: 07136
- Vehicle registration: HN
- Website: www.friedrichshall.de

Bad Friedrichshall (German: [baːt ˈfʁiːdʁɪçshal]) is a town in the district of Heilbronn in Baden-Württemberg in southern Germany. It is situated at the confluences of the Jagst and of the Kocher into the Neckar, some 10 kilometres (6 mi) north of Heilbronn. Bad Friedrichshall arose by the connection of Kochendorf and Jagstfeld in 1933, and is famous for its salt mine.

== Geography ==
Bad Friedrichshall is a town in the district of Heilbronn in Baden-Württemberg in southern Germany. It is situated at the confluences of the Jagst and of the Kocher into the Neckar.

=== Neighbouring municipalities ===
Neighbouring towns and villages of Bad Friedrichshall are (clockwise from the south): Neckarsulm, Untereisesheim, Bad Wimpfen, Offenau, Gundelsheim, Neudenau, Neuenstadt am Kocher and Oedheim, which all belong to the district of Heilbronn. It is 10 kilometres (6 mi) north of the city of Heilbronn Bad Friedrichshall has combined its administration with Oedheim and Offenau.

=== Town structure ===
Bad Friedrichshall is subdivided into the villages of Kochendorf, Jagstfeld, Hagenbach, Duttenberg, Untergriesheim and Plattenwald. A hamlet named Heuchlingen belongs to Duttenberg. The hamlets Waldau and Hasenmühle previously belonged to Hagenbach are parts of Kochendorf.

== History ==
Bad Friedrichshall arose in 1933 by the combination of Kochendorf and Jagstfeld. Its name Friedrichshall is derived from the term Bad for a brine and salt-works in Jagstfeld, named after Frederick I of Württemberg in 1818. The term Hall is a common term in the area related to salt industry.

=== Kochendorf ===
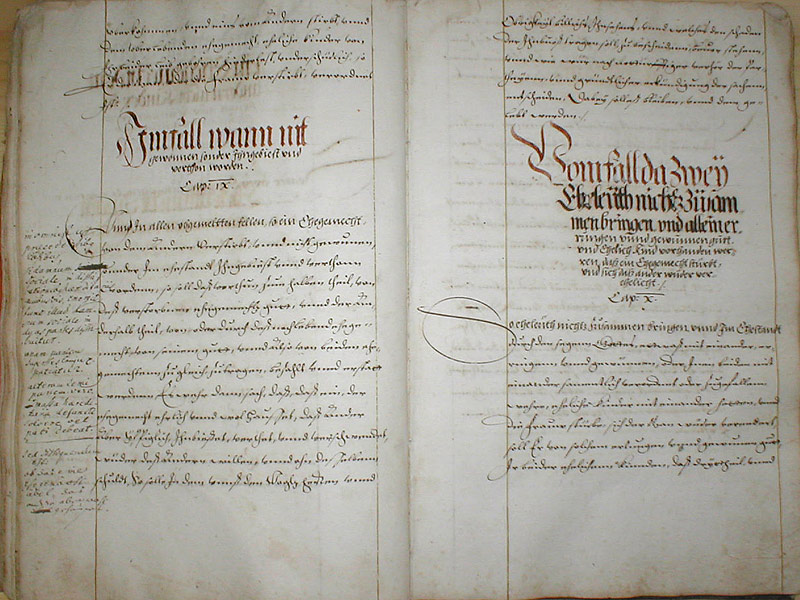
town and court routine of Kochendorf, 16th century

A consolidated estate, around which people settled and from which the village of Kochendorf arose, was first mentioned in 817, Situated at the confluence of the Kocher and the Neckar on a hill. St. Sebastian church probably already existed before 1100. Around 1200, Kochendorf was enclosed with a wall of bricks. In the 13th century there is first mention of a gentry of Kochendorf, dealing with ministerialis of the Staufers in Wimpfen. In the 15th and 16th century the gentry had three castles built. In 1672 the Freiherrs of Saint-André bought a third of the village, and built a new castle on one of the three former castle sites.

In 1762 The Ritterkanton Odenwald was able to buy the whole village from the former heirs, made Kochendorf their chancellery and carried on a knightly hotel, which no longer exists.

In 1806, Kochendorf became part of Württemberg as a free municipality. In 1899, salt-works of the Salzwerke Heilbronn AG were opened.

From the 16th century to the 19th century a large Jewish parish existed: around 1740 a synagogue was built, replaced by a new construction in 1806. Until 1854, the parish grew to 154 people and represented nearly 9% of the village population. However, migration and emigration in the following time decreased the parish enormously. In 1880, merely 71 Jewish inhabitants, and in 1925 only 7 Jews were left. The Jewish parish broke up before 1933 and sold its synagogue to the Protestant parish. Five of Kochendorfs last seven Jews were killed by Nazi persecution between 1940-43.

=== 1933-45 ===
In 1933, Kochendorf combined with the neighbouring Jagstfeld into Bad Friedrichshall. Two years later, Hagenbach was incorporated.

In September 1944, the SS established a subcamp of the Natzweiler-Struthof KZ in Kochendorf. in this last phase of the third reich concentration camps were erected near factories, quarries or mines using inmates as slave labor under the motto "Vernichtung durch Arbeit" (Destruction through work) Companies had to apply for a building modification at the Organisation Todt.

Various military contractors and construction companies were involved: Hochtief, a leading construction company which played a major role in the Third Reich, was commissioned to rebuild the halls into capable production facilities. A large scale expansion up to 40 or 50 mine chambers was planned. Another construction company was the company Koch & Mayer GmbH from Heilbronn. The aircraft company Ernst Heinkel AG had a leading position among the military companies in Kochendorf, commissioned to build experimental units for turbine He S 011, which was to be installed in the Messerschmitt Me P 1101 hunting aircraft. For this turbine, Robert Bosch GmbH and Siemens-Schuckert-Werke AG produced spark plugs, injection pumps and electrical materials. The Motorenwerke Mannheim AG had submarine engine components built in the mine. Only the production of machine guns could not be attributed to any company yet. A detailed permanent exhibition since 2012 can be visited in the Bad Friedrichshall Kochendorf saltmine.

=== 1945–present ===
On June 17, 1951, Bad Friedrichshall was raised to the level of a town. On March 15, 1972, Duttenberg and on January 1, 1975 Untergriesheim followed.

From 1992 until 1998 in the context of increased migration and lack of dwellings for new immigrants the district Plattenwald was rebuilt as part of a flat building program of the state Baden-Württemberg.

== Politics ==
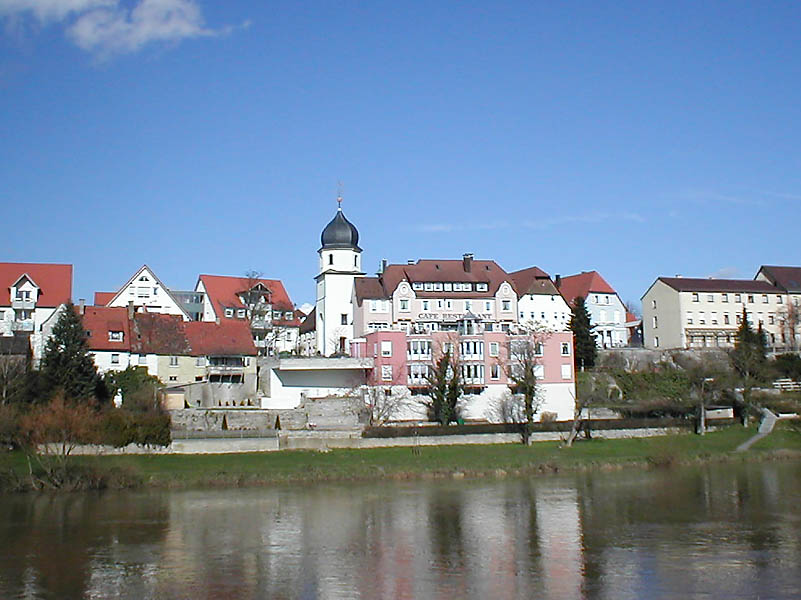
view of Jagstfeld from the Neckar

=== Mayors ===
- 1933-1943: Wilhelm Auwärter (died 1943 at a murder in Paris)
  - 1943-1945: Deputies of Auwärter: Carl Mollenkopf, Hermann Busse (1883-died 1970), Franz Burkart
- 1945: Max Held (introduced by the Americans)
- 1946-1948: Wilhelm Gutmann (deputy of Max Held)
- 1948-1978: Otto Klenert (1915-1993)
- 1978-2002: Peter Knoche
- 2002-2015: Peter Dolderer
- Since 2015: Timo Frey

=== District council ===
Since the municipal election of 25 May 2014, the district council of Bad Friedrichshall has 28 seats. The election results are as follows:

Party / list	share of vote	+ / −	seats	+ / −
CDU	40.2%	− 2.2	11	− 1
SPD	27.9%	−1.9	8	± 0
Freie Wähler (Free voters)	28.3 %	+ 0.6	8	+ 1
FDP	3.6%	+ 3.6	1	+ 1
total	100%		28	

The mayor is a member of the district council and its chairman.

Untergriesheim, Duttenberg, and Plattenwald, each have a village council which sends an honorary chairman to and approved by the district council. These bodies hear matters concerning each village.

=== Arms and flag ===
Arms of Bad Friedrichshall

Blazon: Within the split sign on top of three blue waves a blue globus cruciger with a silver hoop and a black cross, behind in blue a straightened up horse.

The town's colours are blue and white; town logo: depicts the three rivers Neckar, Jagst and Kocher.

The Friedrichshalls coat of arms was originally designed on December 1, 1936, upon the direction of the town and Württemberg's archive. It connects the seal and weapon figures of Kochendorf and Jagstfeld. The three blue waves symbolize the rivers Neckar, Jagst and Kocher. The seal of Jagstfeld, derived since 1797 shows a Fleckenzeichen. In 1951 blue and white colors were determined. on March 4, 1963, the ministry of the interior of Baden-Württemberg officially dedicated the Friedrichshalls arms and flag.

=== International relations ===
Friedrichshalls twin towns are

- Saint-Jean-le-Blanc in the French Department called Loiret (since 1989)
- Hohenmölsen in the former East German state of Saxony-Anhalt (since 1990)
- Isenbüttel in Lower Saxony, Northern Germany (since 2002)

== Culture and sights ==
=== Notable buildings ===
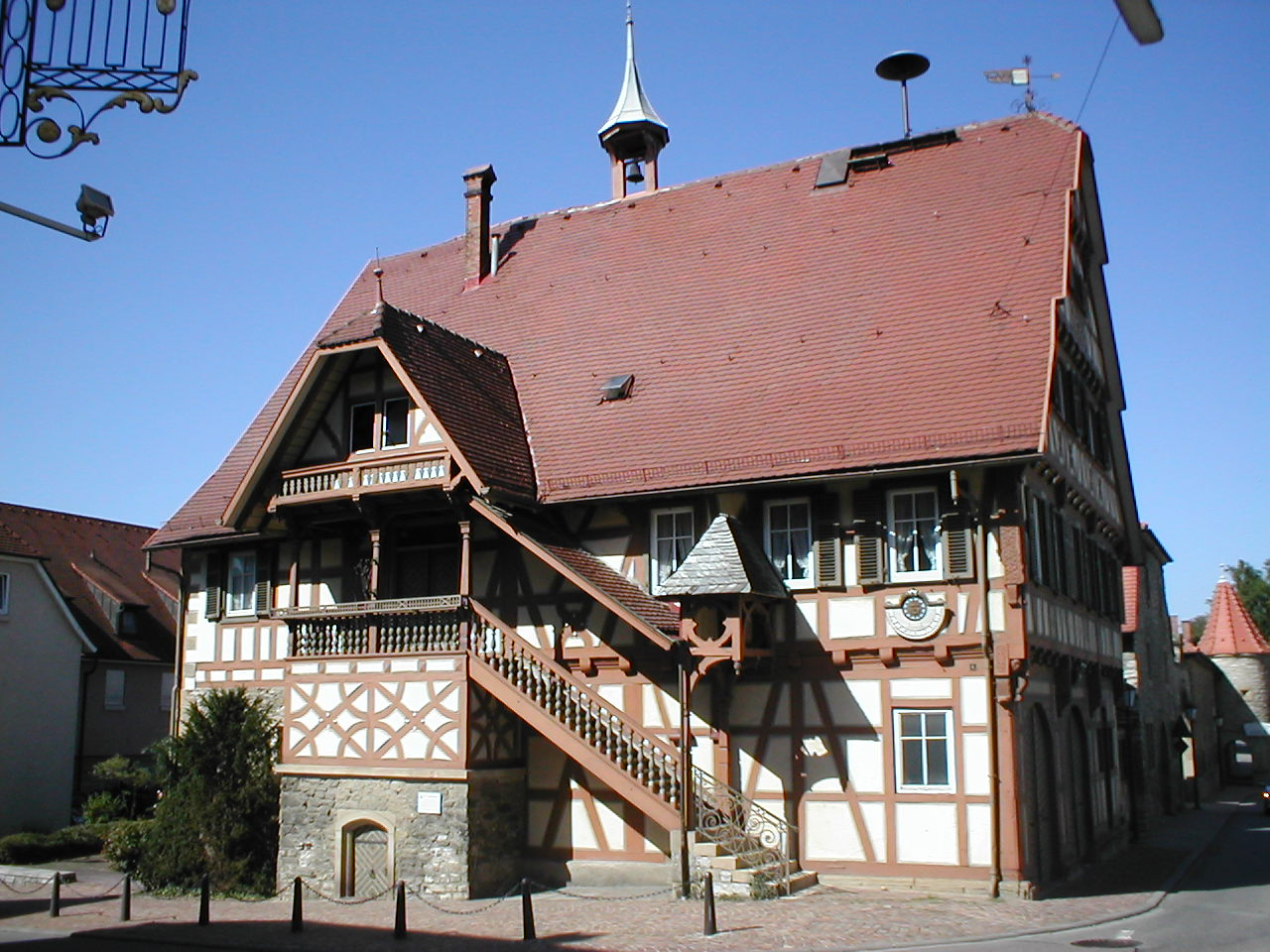
old town hall of Kochendorf

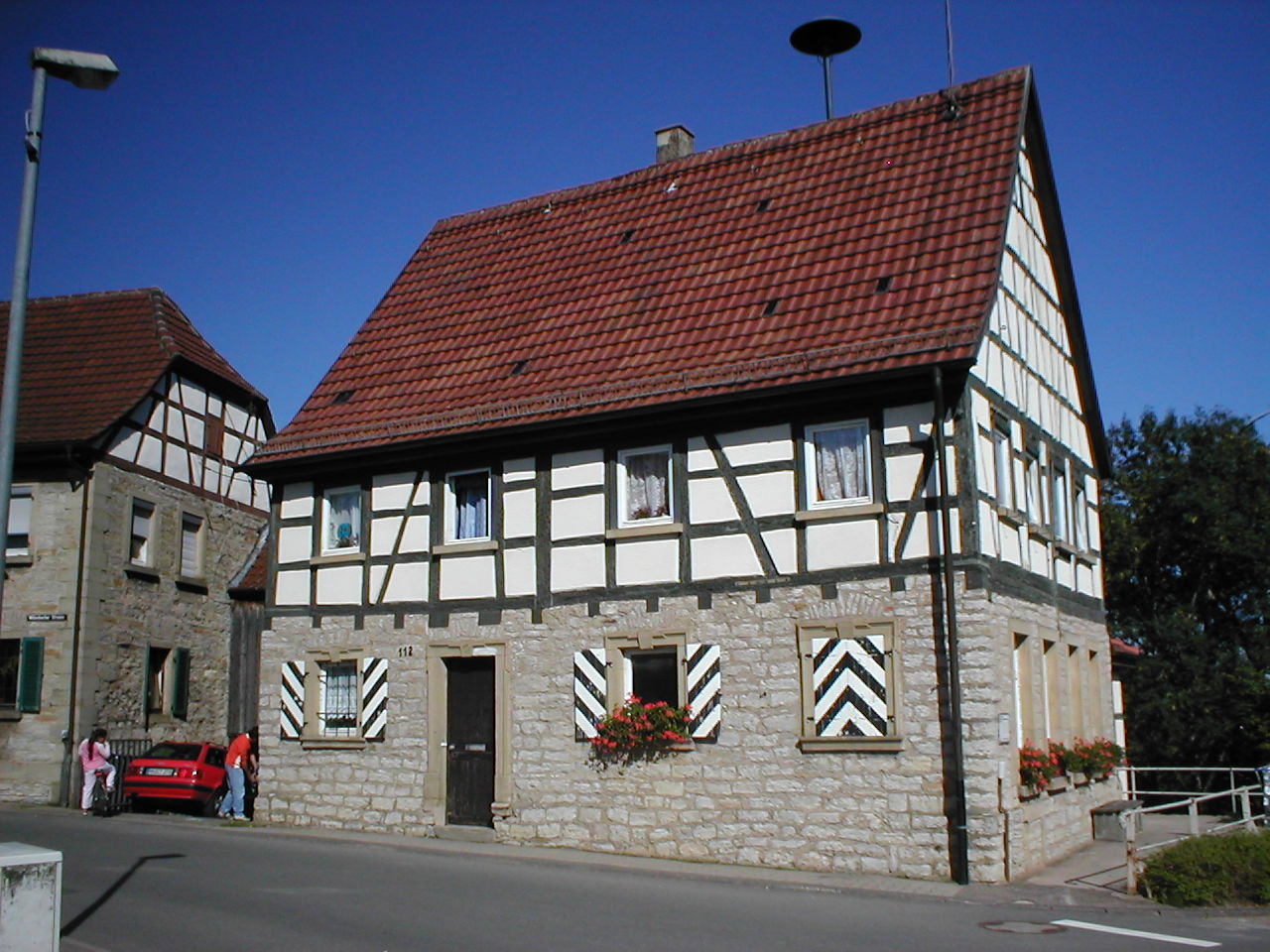
old town hall of Hagenbach

- The Lehen Castle (Kochendorf) was built in 1533 in the renaissance style to replace an old water castle. It serves as a hotel today.
- The Greckenschloss (Kochendorf) was built in 1602 by Wolf Conrad Greck II of Kochendorf and has served different purposes since 1806. In 1829, it became privately owned, and was a cigar and liqueur factory for some time. Next to the castle was a school and residential building. The castle was vacant for some time. Since its renovation in 2010 it serves as an elementary school with rooms rented to the music school of Bad Friedrichshall and painting school for children.
- The St. Andre Castle was built in 1710 by the same-named Freiherrs, owning from 1672 until 1762 a third of Kochendorf. In the today's building instead of the castle there's a notary's office.
- The old town hall of Kochendorf was built in half-timbering in 1597 and received its present form by a renovation in 1890. Once the ground floor consisted a covered market. Within its long history it also served as chancellery of the Ritterkanton Odenwald, whose weapons still adorn the gable side. Later it was a police station. The interior is a private residence, in need of renovation today.
- The Protestant Sebastianskirche presumably arose before 1100 and is the oldest building in Kochendorf. The formerly bricked church was first mentioned in 1294 and consisted of different valuable monuments. It was destroyed in World War II.
- The old wine press of Kochendorf, built in 1553, used as a gym since 1920, is a venue of the Lehen Castle.
- Wendelinus Tower (Jagstfeld)
- Heuchlingen Castle (Duttenberg), is in the agricultural state domain.
- The old town hall of Hagenbach was built around 1800 to replace the former Hagenbach Castle.
- The cemetery chapel (Hagenbach) from the 16th century
- The salt-mine Bad Friedrichshall (Kochendorf) is still active, and attracts visitors from all over Germany and abroad, when it can be visited on weekends.
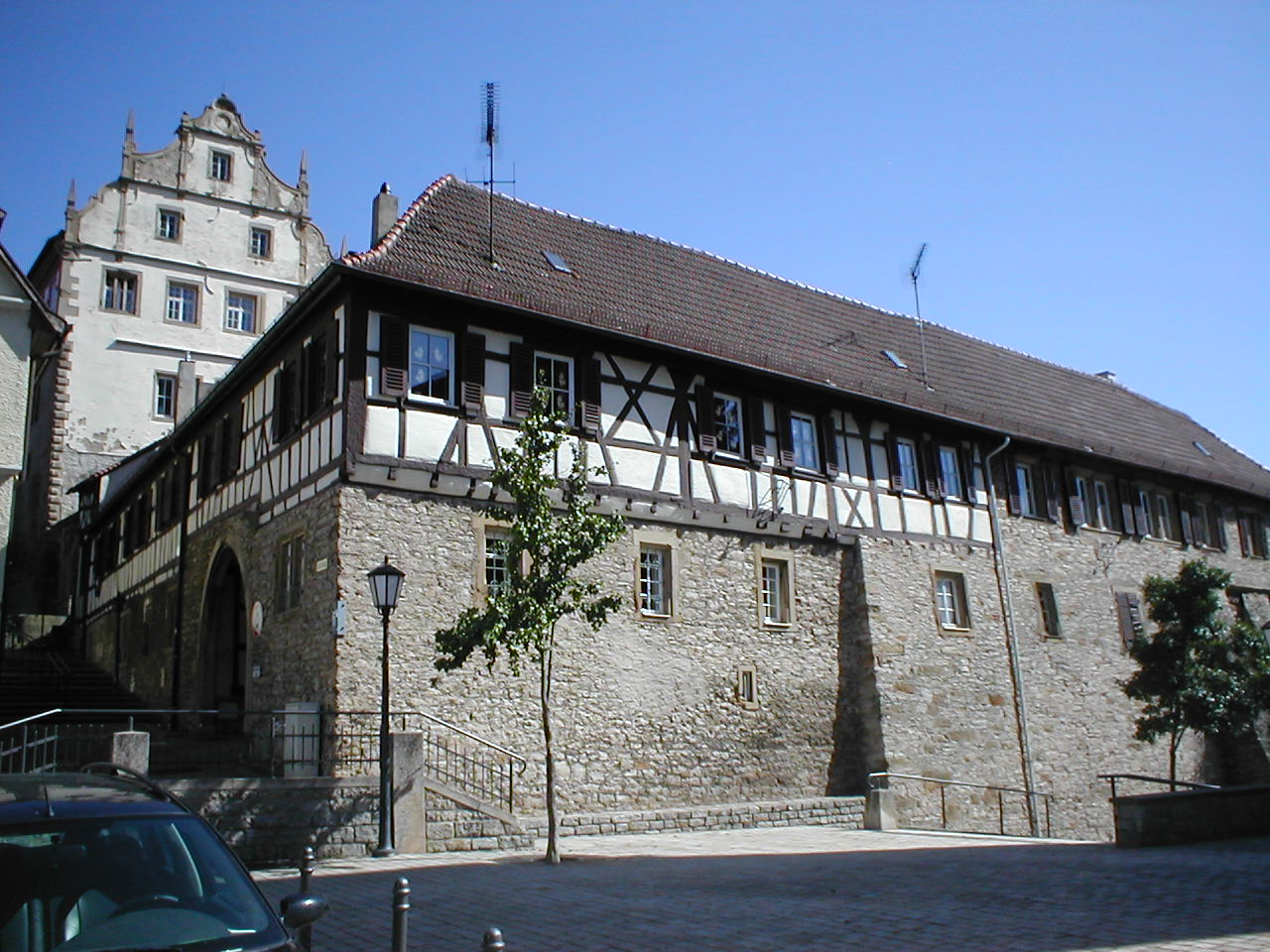
working quarters

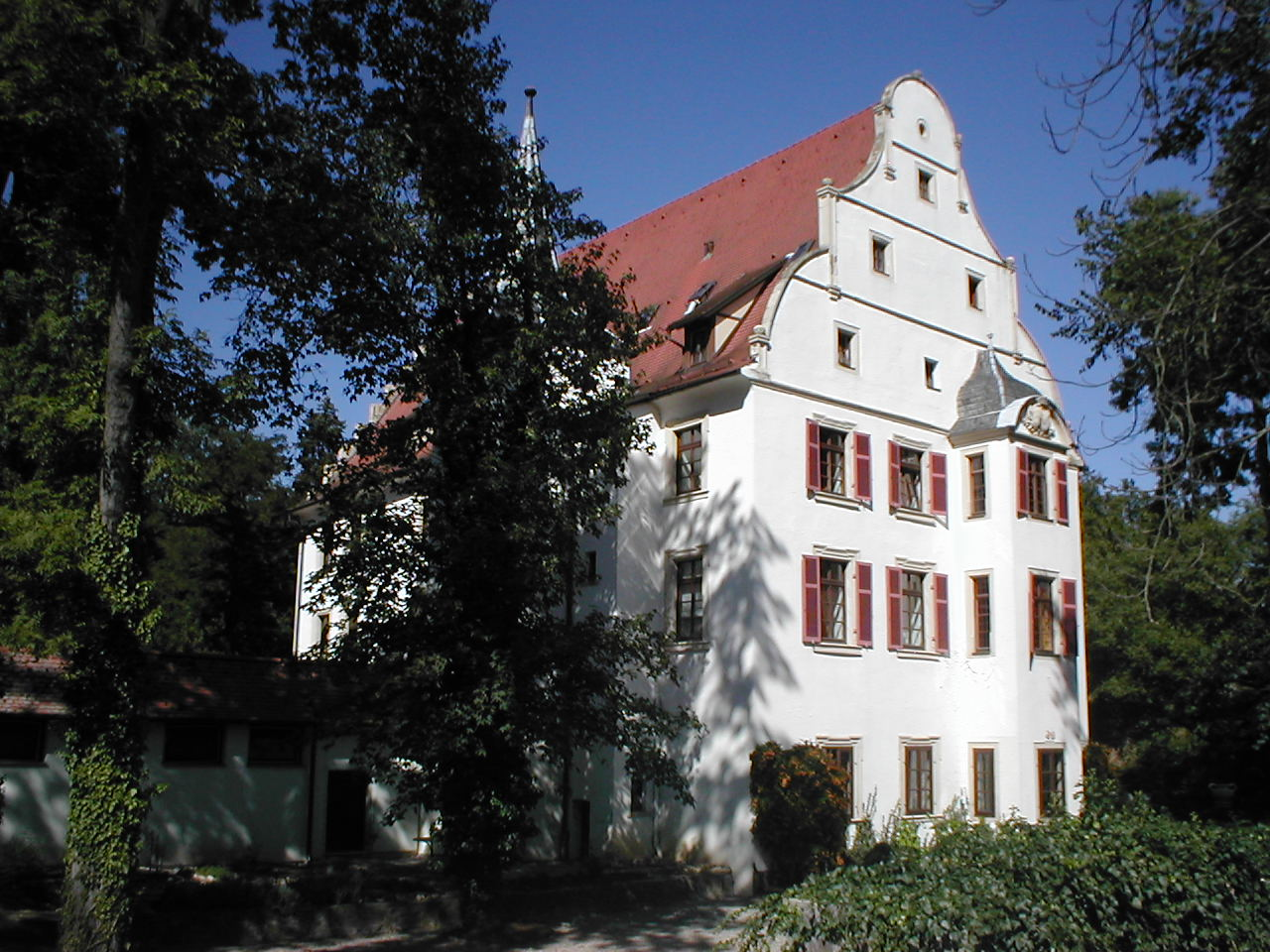
Lehen Castle Kochendorf

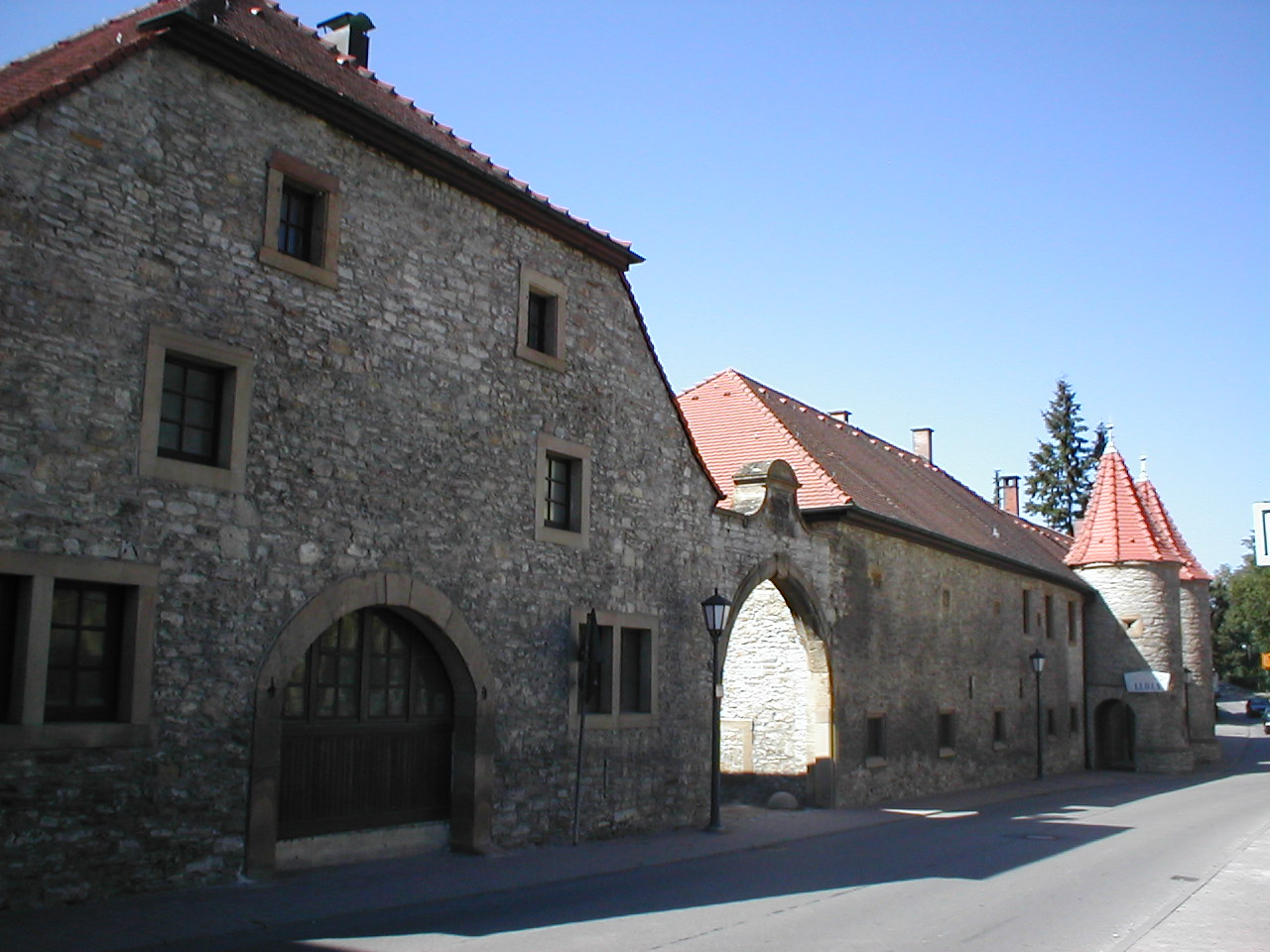
old wine press of Kochendorf

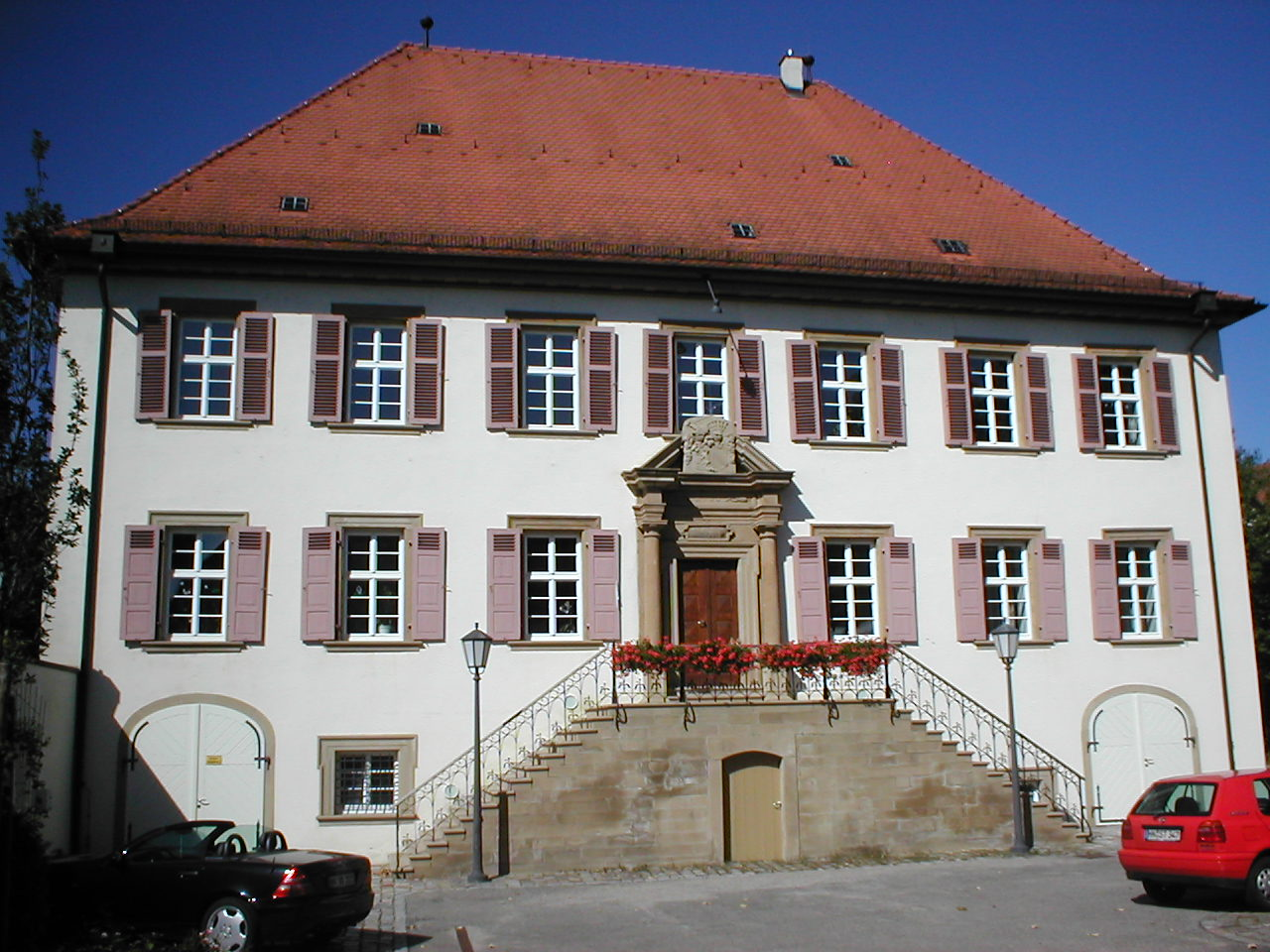
St. Andre Castle

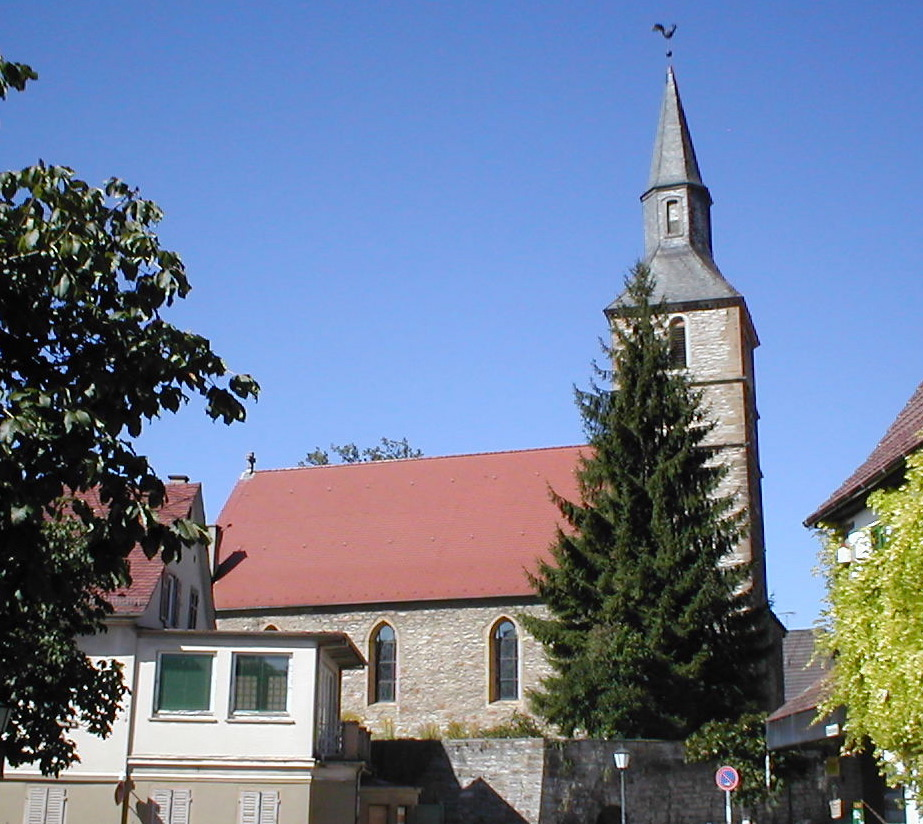
Sebastianskirche Kochendorf

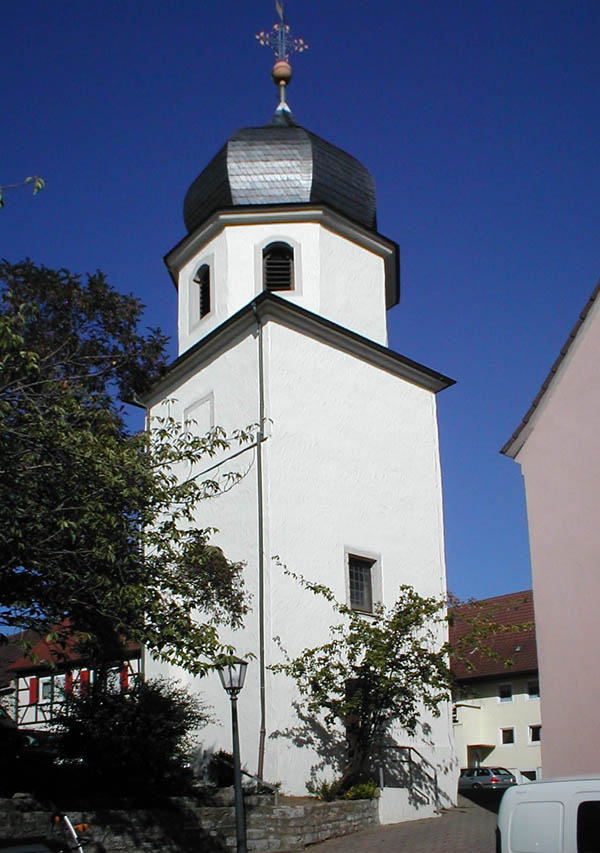
Wendelinus Tower Jagstfeld

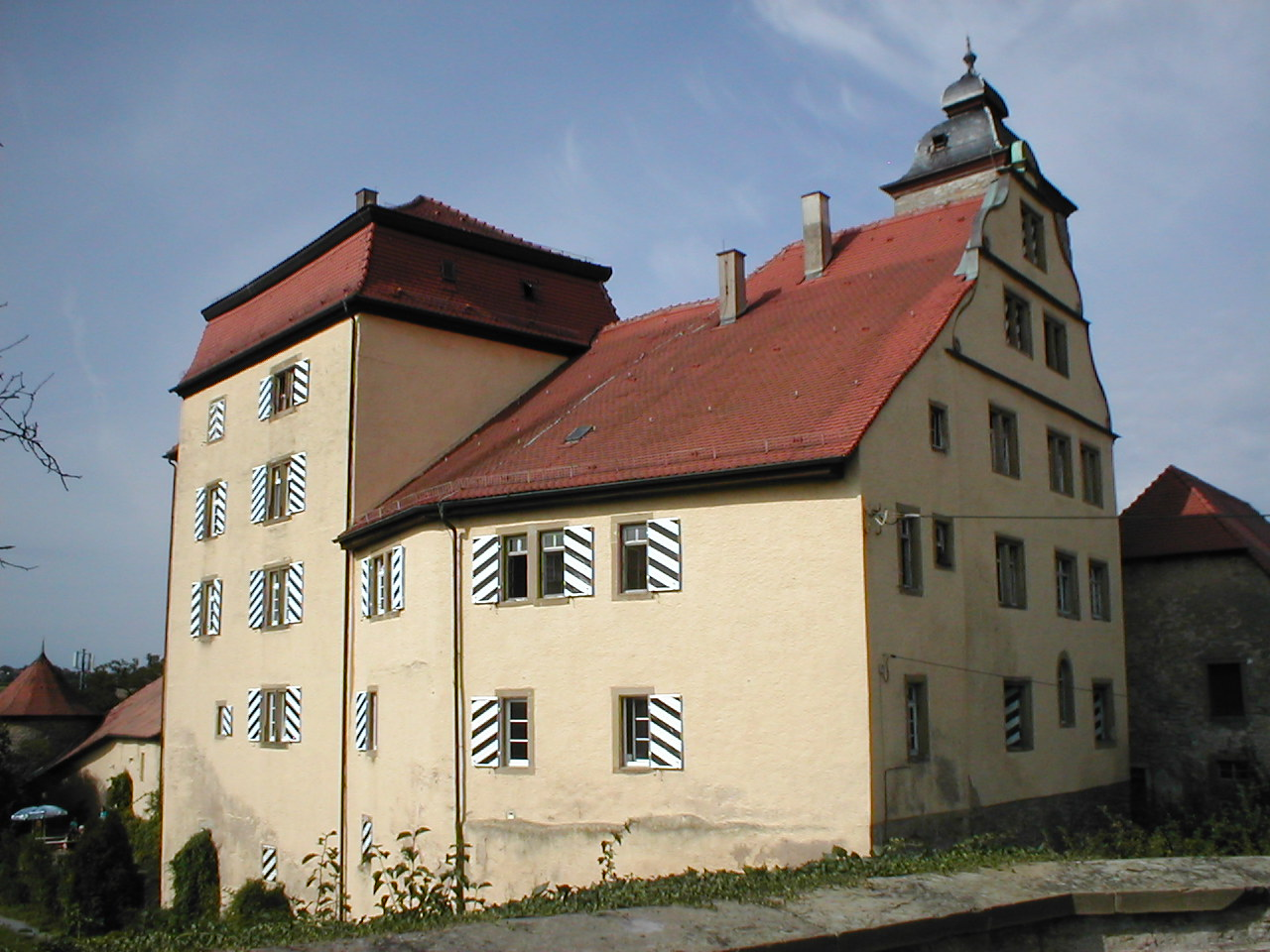
Heuchlingen Castle

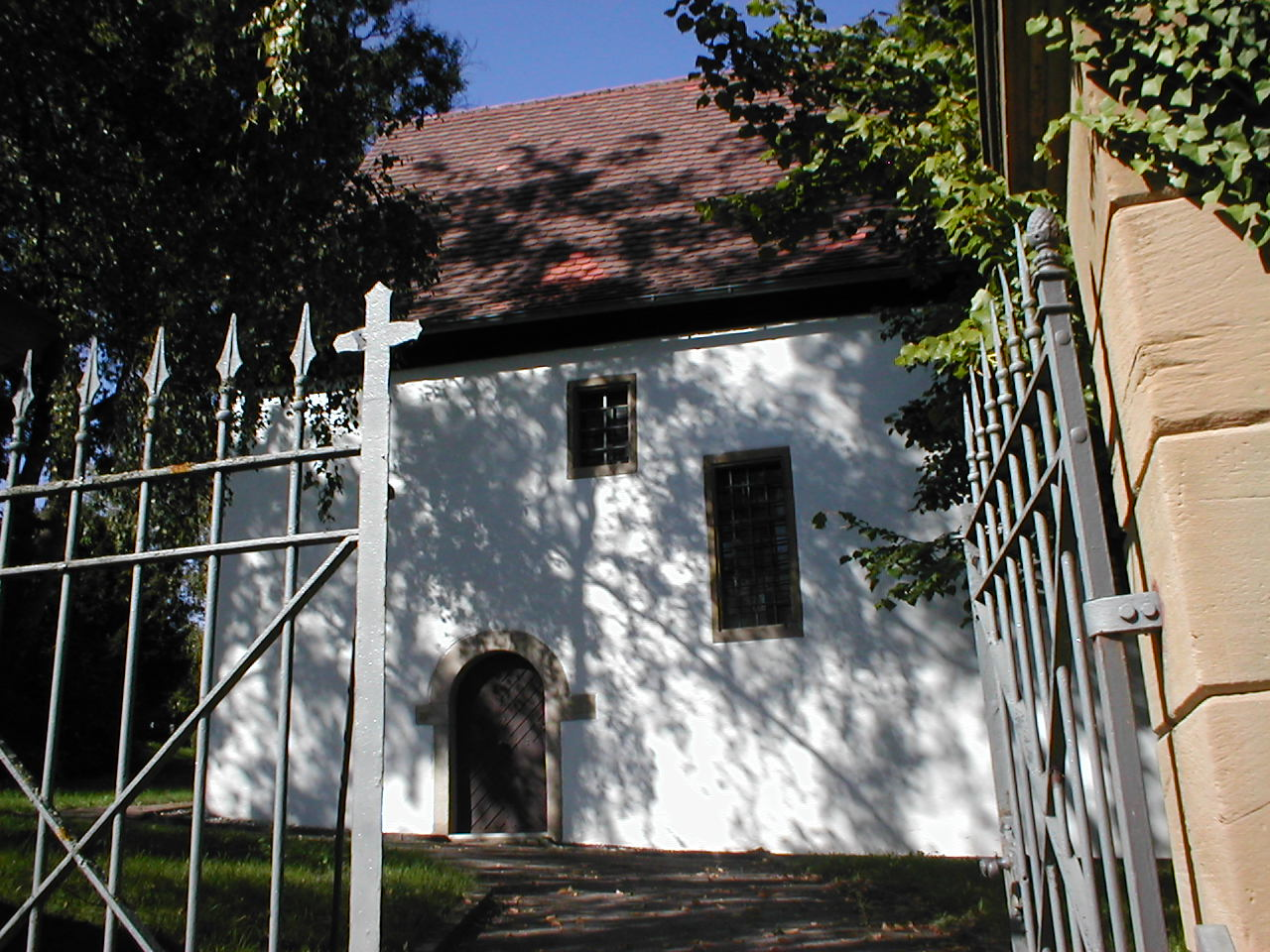
cemetery chapel Hagenbach

=== Regular events ===
- Kilianimarkt, market every year at the beginning of July
- Wald- und Bockbierfest, celebration every year at the last weekend of July and the first weekend of August

== Economy and infrastructure ==
=== Transport ===
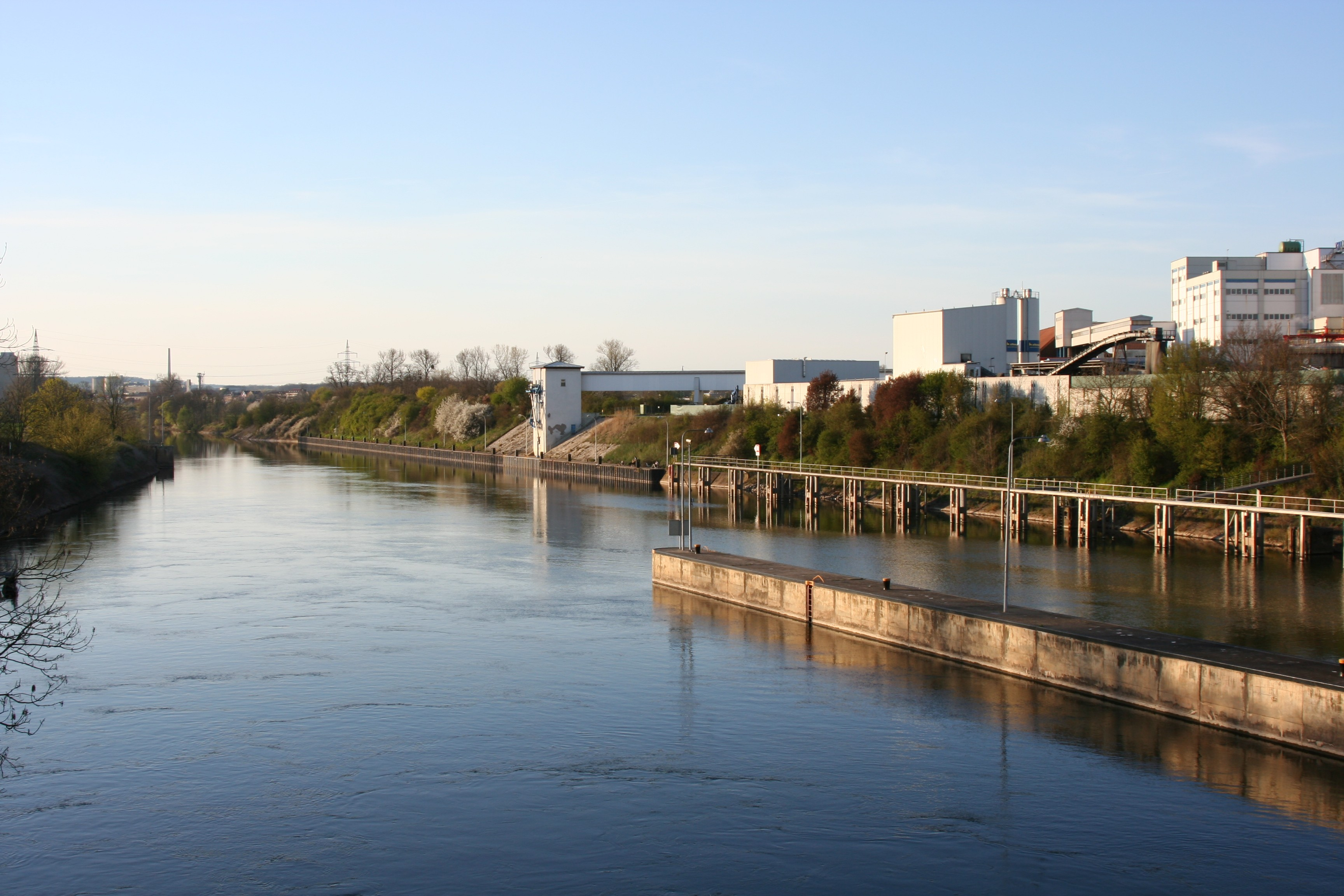
The Neckar Canal nearby the lock of Kochendorf

Bad Friedrichshall-Jagstfeld was an important railway junction and border station between Baden and Württemberg between 1869 and 1920. The large railway yard bears witness to this fact, in the middle of which the station building was placed.

At Bad Friedrichshall-Jagstfeld station the Elsenz Valley Railway and the Neckar Valley Railway (from Heidelberg via Sinsheim and Mosbach respectively) connect with the Franconia Railway from Stuttgart to Würzburg. There was also the Lower Kocher Valley Railway to Ohrnberg until 1993.

In Kochendorf and Untergriesheim there are further stations of the Franconia Railway, only served by RegionalBahn trains. The Duttenberg-Obergriesheim station on the same line was closed in 1971.

Public transport is managed by the Passenger Transport Executive Heilbronner Hohenloher Haller Nahverkehr (HNV).

The Bundesstraße B 27 (Blankenburg (Harz)–Schaffhausen) passes through the town and connects to the Bundesautobahn 6.

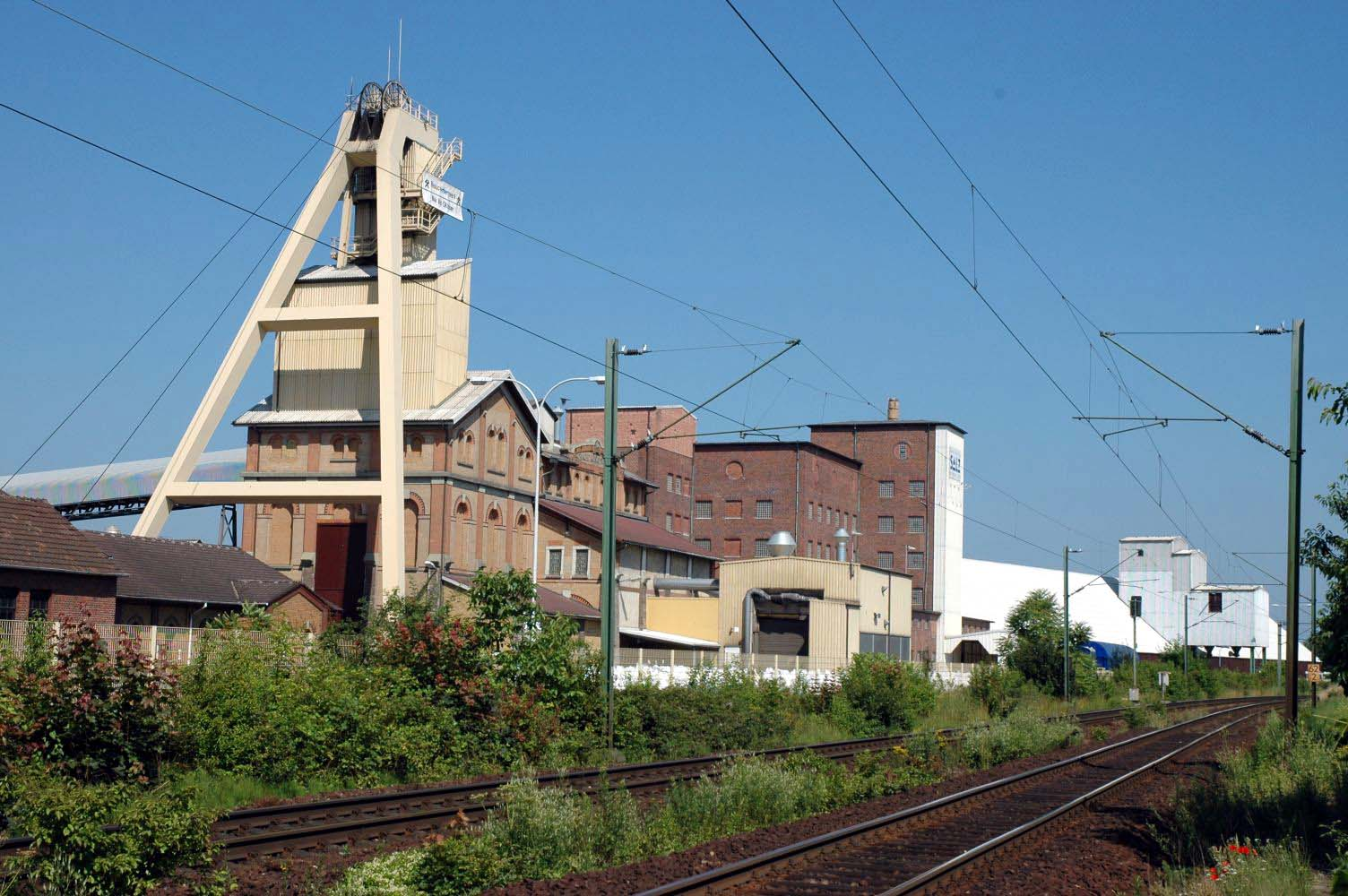
salt-mine of the SWS with shaft König Wilhelm II.

=== Local businesses ===
From 1899 until 1994 the Südwestdeutsche Salzwerke AG (SWS) ran the salt-mine Kochendorf and created a hollow space below Bad Friedrichshall and Neckarsulm of about 12 million cubic metres (420×10^{6} cu ft). In 1901, the shaft was christened to William II. Until 1984, the mine had just one shaft at its disposal, when a 3.7-kilometre (2.3 mi) long subterranean connection to the plant of Heilbronn maintained by the same factory was built. It was also built to evacuate workers in case of emergency. Since 1994 the mine has been filled with rubble and hazardous waste. However, a visitor's mine is still open; it features a subterranean dome hall of the 1920s.

The factory Richard Hengstenberg GmbH & Co. KG produces conserves in Kochendorf. The factory Hänel Büro- und Lagersysteme founded in 1953 produces storekeeping systems with subsidiaries in Wiesentheid, the Swiss Altstätten SG and further ones abroad. The Zahnradfabrik Hänel belongs to the same group and produces cogwheels.

=== Media ===
The Heilbronner Stimme (edition north-middle) and the official paper Friedrichshaller Rundblick are reporting local news in Bad Friedrichshall.

=== Public institutions ===
The Klinikum am Plattenwald is a district hospital in Plattenwald consisting of 422 beds.

=== Education ===
Bad Friedrichshall has six primary schools in Duttenberg, Hagenbach, Höchstberg-Untergriesheim, Jagstfeld, Kochendorf and Plattenwald. There is a Hauptschule and Werkrealschule, the Otto-Klenert-Realschule and the Friedrich-von-Alberti-Gymnasium.

Bad Friedrichshall has a small public library within the Rathaus.

== Personalities ==
- 1913, Hermann Müller, German politician (FDP/DVP), Member of Landtag (Baden-Württemberg), minister of finance of Baden-Württemberg (died 1991)
- 1930, Hans Schreiner, German painter and professor of art in Stuttgart
- 1939, Hermann Mühlbeyer, politician of the CDU, Member of Landtag 1973-2001, permanent secretary 1984-1992
- 1977, Sebastian Deyle, actor and musician
- 1981 Michael Zepek, football player
- 1987 Dominik Britsch, boxer
