= Lower Kochertal railway =

Private railroad in Württemberg, Germany

Bad Friedrichshall-Jagstfeld–Ohrnberg
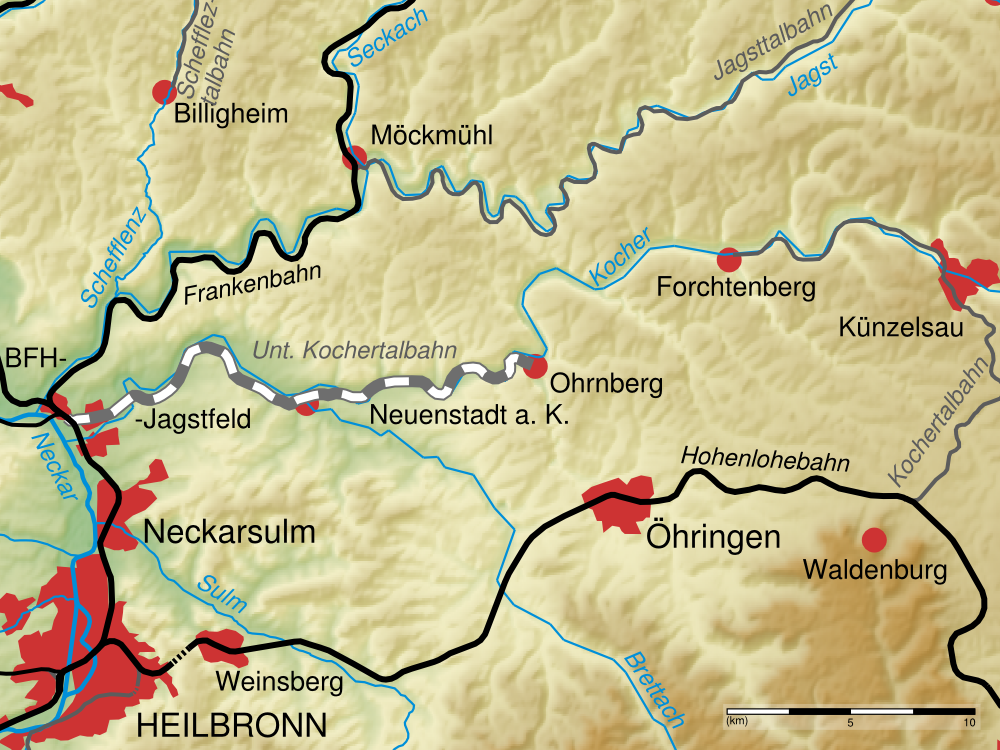

Technical
- Track length: 22.6 km (14.0 mi)
- Track gauge: 1435
- Minimum radius: 180 m (590 ft)
- Operating speed: 50 km/h (31 mph)
- Maximum incline: 8.3

The Lower Kochertal Railway was a standard-gauge private branch line of the Württemberg Railway Company (WEG) in northern Württemberg, Germany. It ran as a branch line from Bad Friedrichshall to Ohrnberg and followed the lower reaches of the Kocher.

With a length of 22.6 kilometres (14.0 mi), it was the longest route of the WEG. It was opened in two stages: on 15 September 1907, the railway reached Neuenstadt, and on 1 August 1913, it was extended to Ohrnberg. After the cessation of operations on 27 December 1993, the initially planned integration into the Heilbronn Stadtbahn network failed. The route is now passable as a cycle path.

== History ==
=== Prehistory, planning, and construction ===
In the era before the construction of the railway, Neuenstadt was located on the stagecoach route from Heilbronn via Mergentheim to Würzburg and was therefore well developed in terms of transport. With the continuous opening of the Stuttgart–Heilbronn–Würzburg line (today's Franconian Railway) in 1869, which ran from Jagstfeld in a northerly direction along the Jagst (Western Fork Railway), Neuenstadt was sidelined. The plans for the construction of the Heilbronn–Hall Kocher Railway, which opened in 1862 and were to run eastwards via Neckarsulm and the lower reaches of the Kocher, promised a remedy. However, the towns in the Weinsberg Valley and the city of Heilbronn succeeded i pushing through a more southerly route via Weinsberg, bypassing Neckarsulm and Neuenstadt, for which the complex construction of the Weinsberg Tunnel was accepted. The reason for Heilbronn was the plans of the Württemberg state for a Neckar port as a transshipment point between ship and rail in Neckarsulm so that Heilbronn as the region's sole transport hub saw its preeminence in danger.

After neither the connection via the Kocher Railway nor the Western Fork Railway was successful, the cities and municipalities petitioned in 1873 for the construction of a railway line in the lower Kocher Valley, but without success. 19 years later, on the occasion of the opening of the Waldenburg–Künzelsau Kocher Valley Railway on 1 October 1892, the Württemberg Prime Minister of Mittnacht held out the prospect of an extension of the line downstream of the Kocher. Citing this, the residents soon submitted a petition for further construction, but this was rejected by the Württemberg government concerning a lack of planning capacity and the heavy burden caused by the construction of main lines. The Kocher Valley Railway was not extended until 1924, but only to Forchtenberg.

While Heilbronn and Neckarsulm flourished due to industrialization and Jagstfeld developed into an important railway junction, the lack of transport connections in the lower Kocher valley led to a creeping depopulation. In Neuenstadt, trade and commerce shrank. The concession of private railway companies in Württemberg from the 1890s onwards brought new hope. On 15 April 1898, a railway committee was formed from Neuenstadt and the communities of Kochertürn, Degmarn, and Oedheim, which commissioned the Arthur Koppel company to carry out studies for a railway. Initial proposals to run the line from the Oberamtsstadt Neckarsulm or Kochendorf to the Kochertal did not meet with the approval of the four municipalities and the royal government, as a connection to the Jagstfeld railway junction (today Bad Friedrichshall Hauptbahnhof) seemed more convenient and thus more economical. The topographical conditions also spoke against Neckarsulm as a starting point.

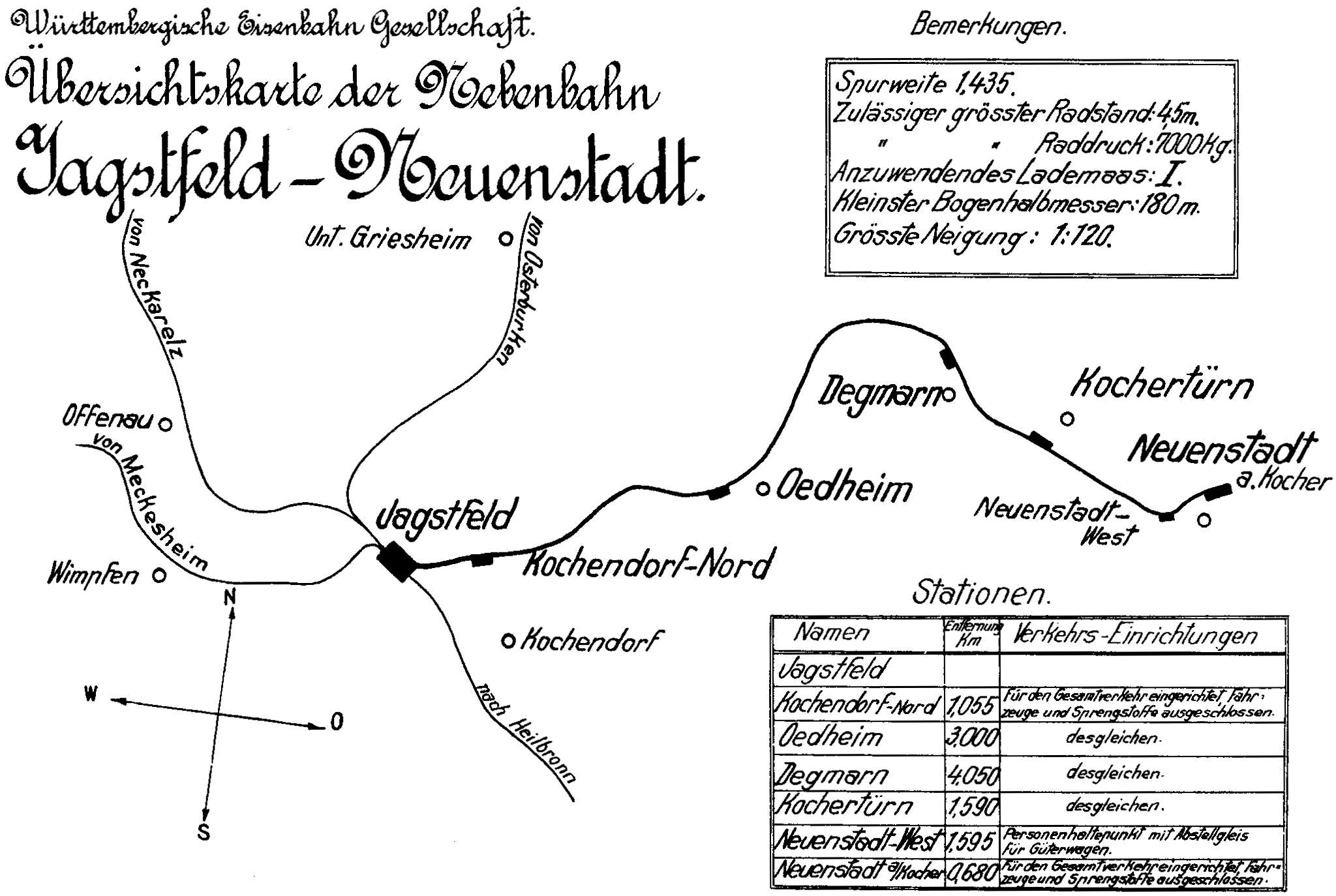
Overview map from the time of the line construction

On 18 December 1898, Koppel proposed a narrow-gauge railway with a gauge of 750 millimeters from Jagstfeld to Neuenstadt. On 25 January 1899, Koppel and the municipalities agreed on the exact route, the location of the stations, and other formalities. The municipalities had to make land available for the route free of charge and also pay a "one-off" subsidy of 50,000 marks per kilometer of rail. The towns then submitted the plans to the Württemberg government, which granted the concession for the construction of the narrow-gauge railway on 29 July 1899 and approved a state subsidy of 20,000 marks per kilometer of railway. This also motivated the municipalities along the Kocher between Neuenstadt and Künzelsau to request a gap closure to the Kocher Valley Railway Waldenburg–Künzelsau.

In the meantime, on 13 May 1899, the WEG with Koppel's representative Köhler as its first director broke away from the Arthur Koppel company. The WEG took over seven further construction and operating concessions for branch lines from Koppel throughout the country. It examined the existing plans and proposed an adjustment to standard gauge due to the favorable terrain conditions and the economic efficiency (freight wagons could be transported continuously). The municipalities agreed to this and with the new contract of 2 January 1901, committed themselves to bear the additional costs of 5000 marks per kilometer of railway. The state of Württemberg approved the project with its new concession of 25 July 1902. This now provided for a state subsidy of 28,000 marks per kilometre, but a maximum of 338,000 marks. The construction of the line had to be completed within four years.

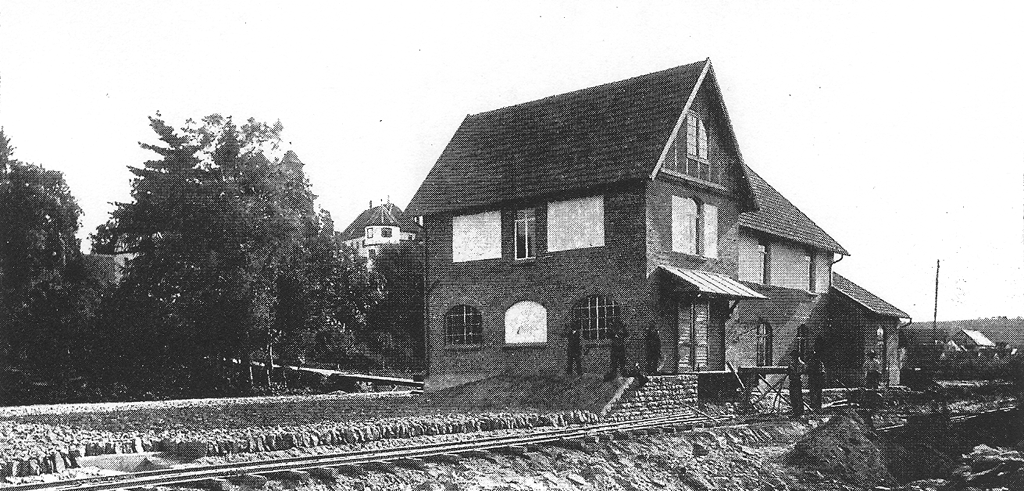
Bahnhof in Neuenstadt vor seiner Eröffnung (1907)

At the end of 1904, construction work could be started from the west with the line through Jagstfeld and the Kocher bridge near Hagenbach. However, there were delays in the construction of the upper section: Since Neuenstadt and Bürg could not agree on the location of the terminus, Bürg demanded that the station be directly on the opposite side of the Kocher. Bürg terminated his support for the project. It was only when the other municipalities took over the outstanding amount that construction at the eastern end of the line could begin in 1906.

With a one-year delay compared to the state requirement, the construction work was completed in 1907. The construction proceeded without any major accidents; the construction costs amounted to 1.49 million marks. On 14 September 1907, the ceremonial inauguration of the Jagstfeld–Neuenstadt branch line finally took place. The following day, the WEG began regular operations.

=== Extension to Ohrnberg ===
While the line was still being built to Neuenstadt, the WEG began planning for the extension of the line to Ohrnberg, after the communities of Gochsen, Kochersteinsfeld, Möglingen, and Ohrnberg had petitioned for the extension of the line at the beginning of 1907. On 17 May 1910, Württemberg granted the WEG the concession for the construction and operation of the extension with a term until 1 November 2000, with a state subsidy of 30,000 marks per kilometer of railway. The neighboring municipalities undertook to contribute a total of 80,000 marks and to make land available free of charge.

On 1 November 1911, construction work began, which included the construction of two more bridges over the Kocher. The construction period extended over a year and a half until July 1913, and the construction costs amounted to 1.072 million marks. On 1 August 1913, the Neuenstadt–Ohrnberg section of the Lower Kocher Valley Railway was ceremoniously opened. The completion of the branch line network in the area of today's Heilbronn district was thus completed.

In 1924, the Deutsche Reichsbahn extended the Kocher Valley railway Waldenburg–Künzelsau to Forchtenberg. The approximately 13-kilometre-long gap between Forchtenberg and Ohrnberg was not closed, although the 40th anniversary of the line to Ohrnberg was still debated in 1953. Plans for a continuation from Ohrnberg to Öhringen or Brettach–Bitzfeld–Bretzfeld also proved to be no longer feasible.

=== Further development (1912–1990) ===
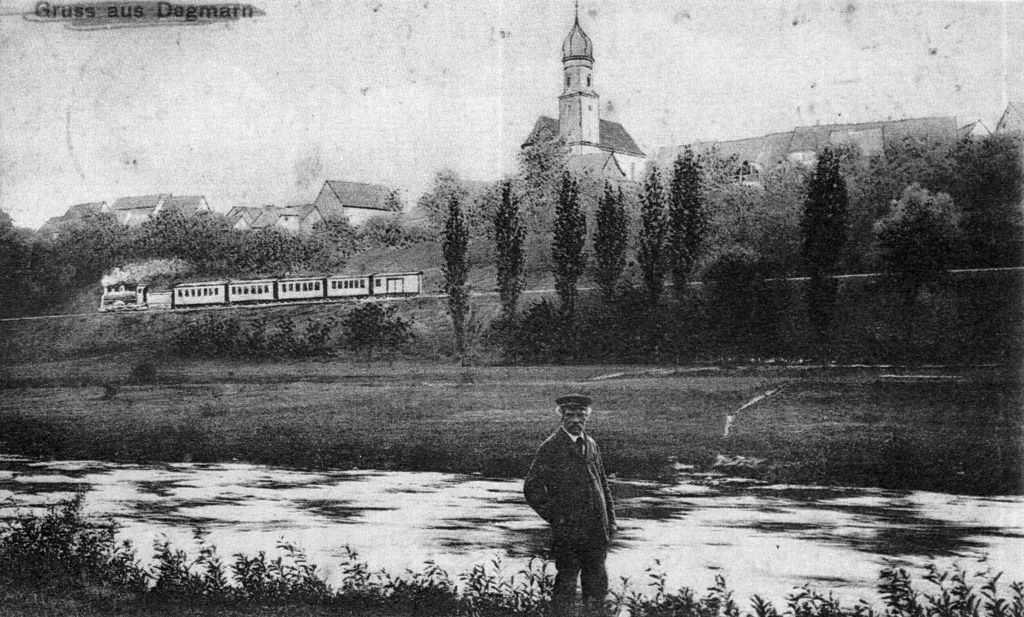
1908 postcard by Melchior Ruoff with a view of Degmarn, in which a fictitious passenger train was drawn in anticipation of the railway

After the opening, the traffic volume developed promisingly. Until the First World War, the railway transported around 120,000 people a year. Thanks to the economic upswing in the late 1920s, the volume of traffic increased to 350,000 people per year. Since necessary maintenance work on the line was not carried out due to the First World War and the crises in the 1920s, renovation could not be started until 1933.

During the Nazi era, a siding was set up in 1937 for the Oedheim military airfield at the level of today's Hirschfeldpark, which led about two kilometers in a south-easterly direction out of the Kocher valley. Towards the end of the Second World War, the line suffered severe damage, especially from low-flying attacks and bombings in the area of Bad Friedrichshall-Jagstfeld station, in which the station building was also destroyed. On November 8, 1944, a bomb hit the railway track near the Kocher Bridge near Bad Friedrichshall-Hagenbach, but operations could be continued for the time being. Only after the Wehrmacht blew up all three Kocher bridges on its retreat to the south on April 1, 1945, between 6:00 p.m. and 8:00 p.m., was train traffic no longer possible.

In 1946, operations were resumed: on 15 August to Neuenstadt, on 23 September to Möglingen, and on 21 December to Ohrnberg. From 1944 until the end of the war, the wrecks of downed Allied aircraft were collected at the airfield, which was reached here via the siding. After the scrap yard was dissolved in 1948, the track became superfluous and was removed soon afterwards.

From 1951 to 1952, the Deutsche Bundesbahn (DB) built a new building for the destroyed station building of Bad Friedrichshall-Jagstfeld station. The building, which had been located on an island until it was destroyed, was replaced by a building on the eastern side of the Bundesbahn facilities, where the passenger train tracks of the WEG had previously been located. From this point on, the WEG also used the DB facilities for passenger transport.

The WEG was one of the first private railways in Germany to consistently switch from steam locomotives to diesel railcars to increase profitability. In 1956, for example, the brand-new diesel railcar T 06 replaced all three existing steam locomotives, which enabled a significant reduction in travel time. Nevertheless, passenger traffic declined continuously from the early 1950s onwards, not only due to the increase in individual traffic but also due to the bus line established by the WEG in 1949, which connected the lower Kocher Valley to Neckarsulm and Heilbronn with double-decker buses without the need to change trains and with a shorter travel time. In 1955, the newly founded WEG subsidiary WEG-Kraftverkehrs-GmbH (KVG) took over the bus operation.

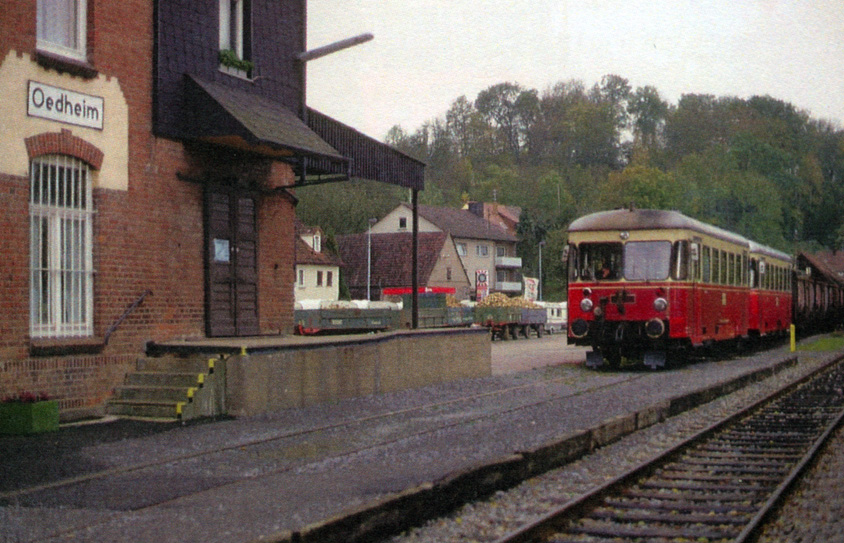
Beet campaign in Oedheim (October 1992)

The school transport to the new middle schools in Neuenstadt and Bad Friedrichshall, which was handled by rail, provided a base load in passenger transport but was not very profitable. Freight traffic developed ambivalently after the Second World War: new sidings to industrial plants in Bad Friedrichshall-Kochendorf and Neuenstadt caused a temporary increase. In the 1970s, freight traffic increased significantly in the autumn due to more efficient transport of sugar beet to Südzucker's plants, so that from about 1980 onwards, beet transport accounted for 85% of freight traffic in the last quarter of the year. The other volume of goods fell continuously.

From 1977 onwards, steam-hauled museum trains of the Eisenbahnfreunde Zollernbahn (EfZ) ran on several Sundays a year on the Lower Kocher Valley Railway. The neighboring communities celebrated the 75th anniversary of the line on 2 October 1982 with a ceremony in Neuenstadt, to which steam special trains of the Society for the Preservation of Rail Vehicles (GES) operated. Occasionally, museum steam locomotives were used in front of photo freight trains and as a scheduled steam service in beet traffic.

=== Light rail planning and decline ===
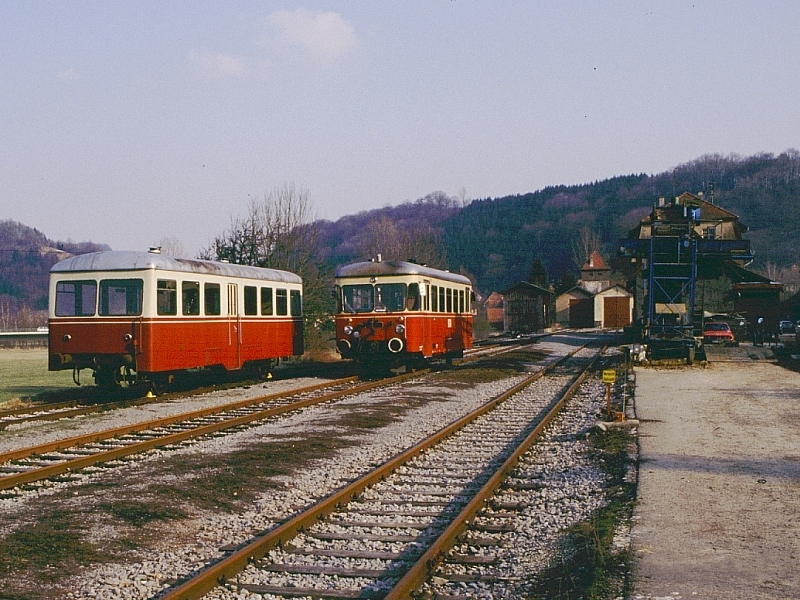
Ohrnberg station with VT 23 (right) and sidecar (left), February 1993

In December 1991, the state of Baden-Württemberg initiated the 1992/1993 public transport mission statement with financial support from the program for the improvement of the traffic situation in Baden-Württemberg and the city and district of Heilbronn with the redrawing of the overall transport plan. Within the framework of this study, the potential of an improved public transport infrastructure in the Heilbronn area was investigated using expanded bus or train services and the option of a light rail operation based on the Karlsruhe model. The Bad Friedrichshall-Jagstfeld–Kochersteinsfeld section in the Heilbronn district was taken into account. The result of the study presented on 25 September 1992 was the recommendation to include this section of the Lower Kocher Valley Railway in the network of the Heilbronn Stadtbahn, which was born as a result of the study. The estimated investments for the Bad Friedrichshall-Jagstfeld–Kochersteinsfeld section alone amounted to 35.4 million German marks (DM).

By the end of the 1980s at the latest, operations on the Lower Kocher Valley Railway were becoming heavily loss-making due to declining traffic volumes, with annual losses of DM 60,000 to DM 240,000. In addition, Südzucker AG announced that it would cease beet transports to the sugar factory in Offenau, which accounted for the majority of freight traffic, at the end of 1993. The WEG took this as an opportunity to apply to the Baden-Württemberg Ministry of Transport for release from the obligation to operate as of 31 December 1992. It presented the plans to the affected municipalities on 17 June 1992. They rejected the project and demanded at least continued operation until beet traffic was discontinued, as well as subsequent conservation of the line to Kochersteinsfeld to enable the later light rail operation.

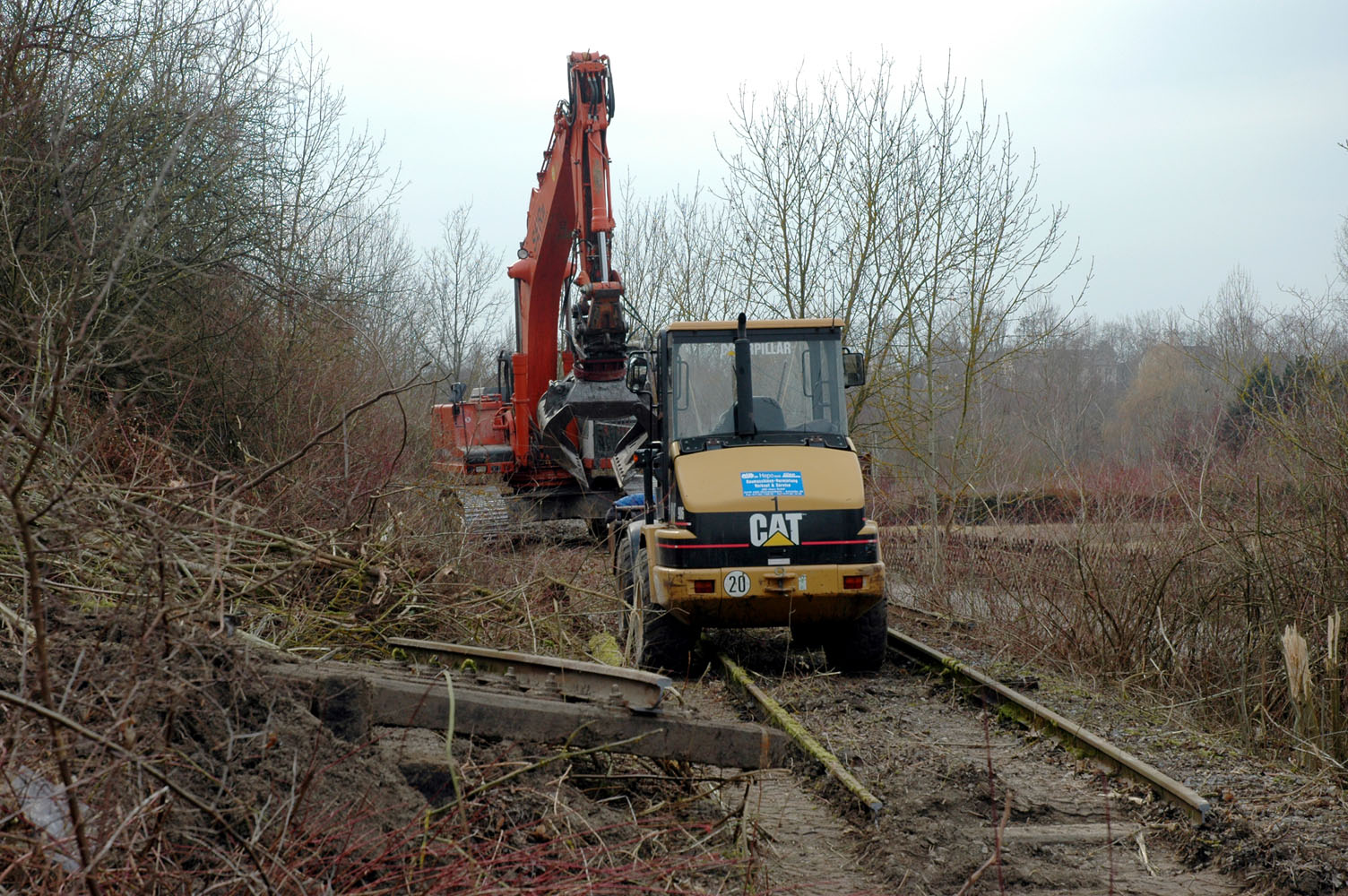
Dismantling of the line near Oedheim (Feb. 2006)

Since an additional volume of goods of 100,000 tons per year from 1993 onwards seemed to be in prospect due to the transport of excavated earth and plans for a freight trunk track in Neuenstadt arose, the WEG refrained from discontinuing it for 1993 for the time being. The last regular passenger train ran on the line on 28 February 1993, even before the Baden-Württemberg Ministry of Transport granted permission on 1 April 1993 for the permanent cessation of passenger services and for a temporary release from the obligation to operate freight traffic. The last museum train ran on 10 October 1993. With the end of the beet campaign in 1993, a freight train ran on the line between Bad Friedrichshall-Jagstfeld and Ohrnberg for the last time. The last official day of operation was December 27, 1993. After that, traffic came to a standstill, and the line became deserted. The level crossings were successively asphalted. The Kochersteinsfeld–Ohrnberg section was then closed and converted into a cycle path through the Hohenlohe district, which is part of the Kocher-Jagst cycle path.

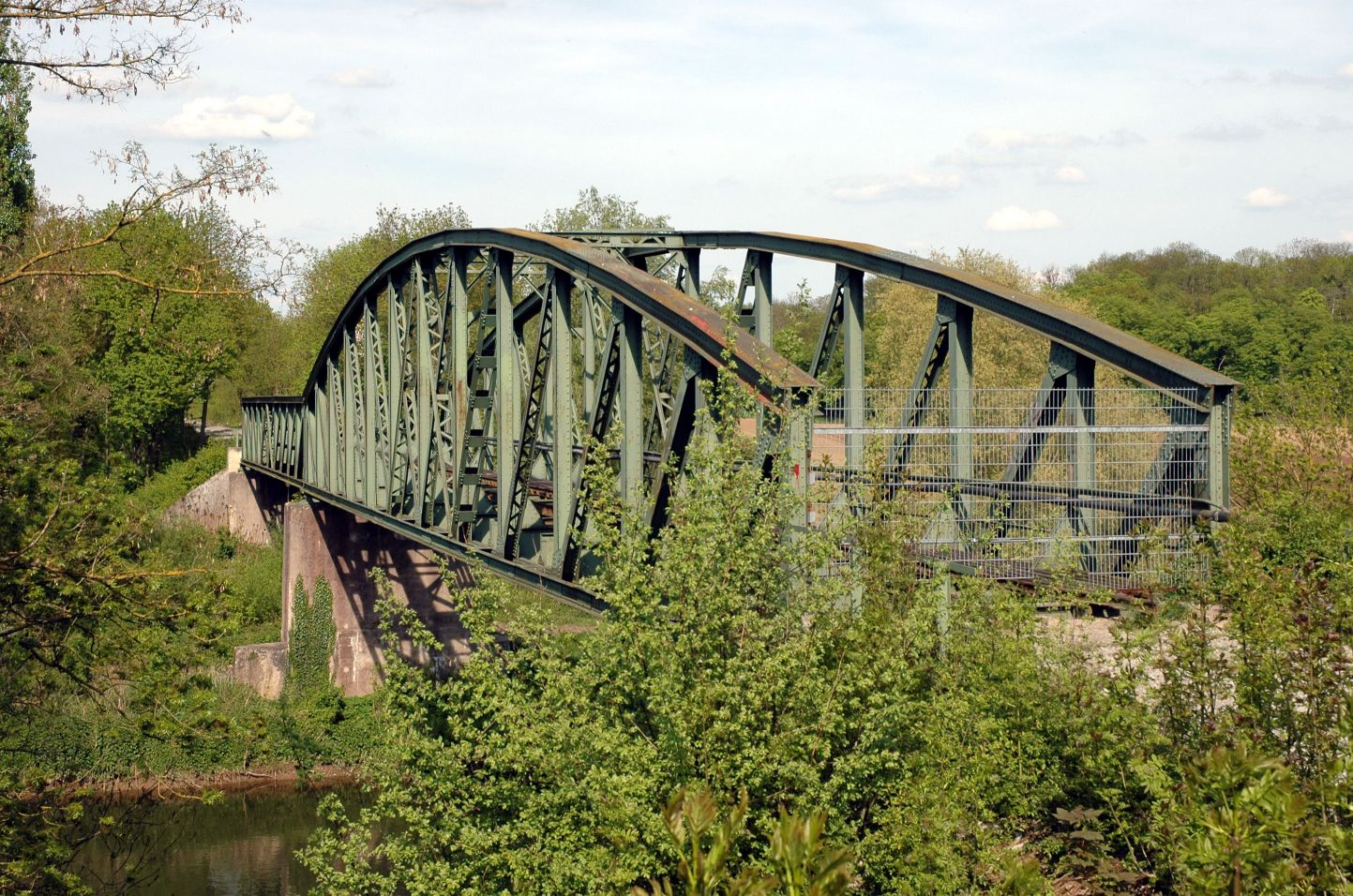
Kocher Bridge near Bad Friedrichshall-Hagenbach in May 2008

It was not until seven years later that the situation changed for the railway: In the updated public transport mission statement 1999/2000, published in 2000, the economic efficiency of the light rail operation was again examined on behalf of the city and district of Heilbronn. Since the originally assumed passenger potential was not found to be realistic, the study recommended that the project of a light rail system in the lower Kocher Valley should not be pursued any further. Other factors identified as unfavorable were high investments with simultaneous operational disadvantages due to the necessary head-making in Bad Friedrichshall-Jagstfeld and the shorter travel time of express buses between Heilbronn and Neuenstadt. Therefore, the district council of the Heilbronn district decided in its meeting on 22 July 2002 to dispense with the standardized assessment and not to include the Bad Friedrichshall-Jagstfeld–Kochersteinsfeld route in the 2010 target concept for the Heilbronn Stadtbahn. The city of Neuenstadt took this as an opportunity to use the conveniently located railway line for a bypass.

The WEG then put the line out to tender by § 11 of the General Railway Act and, after no interested party was found by 27 December 2002, applied for de-zoning, which was granted on 21 June 2003. After long negotiations, the neighboring municipalities took over the route after the WEG had dismantled all remaining tracks at the beginning of 2006. At the end of 2007, the Neuenstadt northern bypass was completed. The remaining route was then also expanded as part of the Kocher-Jagst cycle path, and the official opening took place on 13 June 2009. The costs for the 19 km long section amounted to a total of € 3.7 million and were borne by the state of Baden-Württemberg, the district of Heilbronn, and the neighboring municipalities. The main cost factor was the demolition and new construction of the Hagenbach Kocher Bridge, which cost € 1.1 million after renovation had proven to be too expensive.

== Operation ==
The headquarters of the operations management for the entire line was located at Neuenstadt station. Ohrnberg had been the home station for all vehicles since the extension, and the previously used locomotive shed in Neuenstadt could be abandoned. A workshop in Ohrnberg made minor repairs possible. At the end of the elongated tracks, there was a two-standing locomotive shed and an older one-standing shed. Rooms on the ground floor of the station building were most recently used as service rooms. In Bad Friedrichshall-Jagstfeld, the staff and waiting rooms of the state railway were available for the line to Ohrnberg.

=== Vehicles ===
==== Steam locomotives ====
The WEG initially put the line into operation in 1907 with two brand-new four-coupler tank locomotives. The engines were procured by the Humboldt Engineering Institute in Cologne as a wet steam compound engine and bore the WEG internal numbers 11 and 12. Locomotive 12 was stationed in Ohrnberg until 1959 and was scrapped on-site after the end of its service. Locomotive 11 was added to the Amstetten–Gerstetten WEG line in 1933 and later to the Vaihingen Stadtbahn.

The WEG locomotives 14 and 15, both four-couplers with wet steam compound engines, replaced locomotive 11. They were built in 1908 by Borsig for the Bremen–Thedinghausen light railway (BTh) and acquired in 1914 by the WEG, which initially used them on the Nürtingen–Neuffen railway. Until their retirement (1956 and 1960, respectively), the two locomotives remained on the lower Kocher Valley Railway and were then scrapped in Ohrnberg.

At times, the WEG used other individual machines on this route. Locomotive 16 was a three-coupler with a wet steam twin engine and was built in 1911 by Hohenzollern AG for the Kaldenkirchen–Brüggen light railway. In 1922, it came to the WEG, first on the Nürtingen–Neuffen line, later also to Ohrnberg. Locomotive 19 was a four-coupler with a wet steam compound engine. It had been built by Borsig in 1906 for the Eberswalde-Schöpfurther Railway and came to the WEG in 1926. In addition to the Lower Kocher Valley Railway, it was also in service between Nürtingen and Neuffen. In 1932, locomotive 20 was in use for a short time: The wet steam quad-coupler had been built by Hanomag in 1914 for a sugar factory in Cape Town but was not delivered due to the First World War. It was used on the Flensburg Harbour Railway until it was taken over by the WEG in 1932. Due to its insufficient steam production, it was unsuitable for use on the long line between Bad Friedrichshall-Jagstfeld and Ohrnberg and was used as a replacement locomotive on various WEG lines.

==== Railcar ====
The steam-free era began on 14 February 1956 with the new T 06 railcar procured from Waggonfabrik Fuchs. It had the axle arrangement Bo and offered seating for 42 people. It was equipped with buffers and screw couplings and could thus also haul freight trains as a towing railcar. Two Büssing U11D engines, each with 210 hp, were installed. From 1956 to 1979, it handled all traffic. It then moved to the Nürtingen–Neuffen line and is still in use today on the Amstetten–Gerstetten Museum Railway.

On 3 October 1979, the two railcars T 23 and T 24, which were no longer needed between Nürtingen and Neuffen, replaced the T 06. After the cessation of operations between Bad Friedrichshall-Jagstfeld and Ohrnberg, they were first transferred to Neuffen and are now in service with Westerwaldbahn GmbH.

==== Car ====
Initially, three cars were available for passenger transport, and there was also a combined mail and baggage car until postal transport was discontinued in 1958. With the extension to Ohrnberg, the number of passenger coaches increased to five, and two trains could be formed. Due to a lack of demand for the handling of passenger traffic with diesel railcars, the stock gradually fell to three by the end of the 1960s, and it was then completely dismantled. In 1965, the VB 122 sidecar came from the Albstadt-Ebingen–Onstmettingen WEG line to Ohrnberg to reinforce the VT 06. The car was built in 1956 by Auwärter from the chassis of an old passenger car. With the exchange of T 06 for T 23 and 24, the VB 122 came to Neuffen, and the VB 204 sidecar, which had been converted in 1958 from a passenger car chassis from 1908, from Neuffen to Ohrnberg. Thus, from 1980 until the cessation of operations in 1993, the vehicle fleet of the Lower Kocher Valley Railway constantly included the diesel railcars T 23 and 24 as well as the VB 204 trailer.

=== Passenger traffic ===
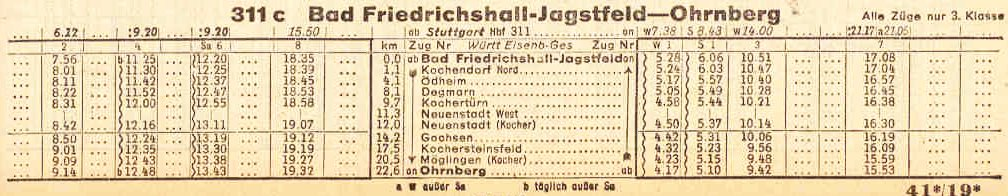
Excerpt from the timetable book of 1944

After the opening of the entire line, the passenger train service comprised four pairs of trains on weekdays and five on Sundays. On Wednesdays, an additional pair of trains ran between Jagstfeld and Neuenstadt. The travel time for the 11.9 kilometers was 62 to 72 minutes. This train service remained constant until the end of the Second World War. In 1938, a passenger train took 56 minutes to cover the entire route to Ohrnberg. From 1950 onwards, the train service included only three pairs of trains with a travel time of 60 to 70 minutes. In addition, there was a pair of trains between Bad Friedrichshall-Jagstfeld and Kochersteinsfeld. This train service remained constant in the following years. With the conversion of operations to diesel railcars, the travel time could be reduced to 42 minutes. From 1970 onwards, additional school trains enriched the timetable. It was not until 1983 that the WEG suspended operations on weekends from Saturday noon to Monday morning, at a time when this had already been implemented for the other WEG routes. In 1984, the train service included only one pair of trains in both directions, plus a train from Ohrnberg to Bad Friedrichshall-Jagstfeld, a pair of GmP, and a GmP from Bad Friedrichshall-Jagstfeld to Ohrnberg. For school transport, there was a pair of trains and a single train from Bad Friedrichshall-Jagstfeld to Neuenstadt, as well as a pair of trains from Bad Friedrichshall-Jagstfeld to Kochersteinsfeld. The journey time was 43 minutes, with a GMP it was 64 to 91 minutes. In 1985, the timetable offered an additional pair of trains but was then continuously reduced: in 1989, there were two pairs of trains on weekdays outside school transport, from 1990, only one in the form of the GmP.

Development of passenger numbers 1908–1990

The annual number of passengers after the opening was around 120,000. This number hardly increased due to the extension of the line to Ohrnberg in 1913 and rose to around 350,000 by 1919. After that, the number fell steadily and reached a minimum of 80,000 in 1935. After the end of the Second World War, the numerous hoarding trips reached a passenger peak of 470,000 people. Due to the increase in private transport and the competing bus lines since 1949, the number of passengers fell again and reached its absolute low point in 1966. The orientation of the transport service towards school transport to the middle schools established in the 1950s in Bad Friedrichshall, Oedheim, and Neuenstadt was able to revive the traffic volume somewhat, even if school transport was not very profitable.

=== Freight traffic ===
Freight traffic along the lower Kocher Valley developed satisfactorily in the early years without any particular focus. In freight transport, the bell foundry and fire brigade equipment factory Bachert, Unterland AG (today: Hengstenberg) and the gasworks in Kochendorf and various quarries and sawmills were supplied, among others, and land trade also accounted for a share of just under 10% in the end; there were cooperative camps at the stations in Oedheim, Neuenstadt, Kochersteinsfeld and Möglingen. After the Second World War, additional customers were acquired at Kochendorf Nord station with a manufacturer of office and storage systems and a waste oil recycling company. In 1962 and the 1970s, there were plans for an oil refinery between Oedheim and Kochertürn, which would have received a siding. However, the project failed due to resistance from the population.

In general cargo traffic, the entire route to Ohrnberg was served, in recent years, with at least one wagon a day. In Neuenstadt, there was a large shed for the storage of general cargo. The WEG served other places in the Kocher Valley from Neuenstadt by truck; after the discontinuation of general cargo traffic in the lower Jagst valley by the DB on 31 December 1979, the WEG also took over the general cargo transports there by truck. After the DB completely shifted general cargo traffic to the road on 31 December 1989, and thus the WEG no longer delivered freight wagons, a freight forwarder served the traffic from Heilbronn by truck.

Development of freight volume 1908–1990

After World War II, transporting sugar beet to sugar factories was of paramount importance during the autumn campaign. From the 1970s onwards, cooperatively procured modern loading facilities that supported the automatic transfer of beets from trailers to open freight wagons. Fixed facilities were located in Oedheim, Kochertürn, Gochsen, and Ohrnberg, there was a movable plant in Kochersteinsfeld and, for a time, in Neuenstadt. During the campaign in 1990, for example, 600 to 700 freight wagons were handled per month and a maximum of 20 out of season. These transports ultimately account for around 85% of the total volume of freight traffic, so the shift of freight traffic to road transport at the beginning of the 1990s, in addition to the uncompetitive passenger transport service, was decisive for the decline of the railway line.

== Course ==
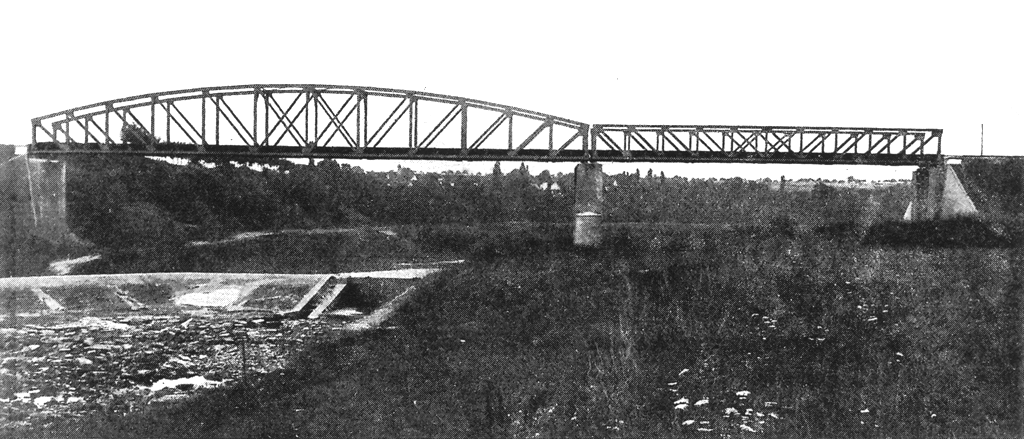
Kocher Bridge near Bad Friedrichshall-Hagenbach (1907)

Since the construction of the new Bad Friedrichshall-Jagstfeld station in 1952, the Lower Kocher Valley Railway has started at the station of the Deutsche Bundesbahn, previously, the WEG had its simple tracks and a connecting track for the transfer of freight wagons. There was no separate office building at that time.

Behind Jagstfeld, the railway ran through the Kocherwald and reached the edge of Kochendorf north of the Kocher at Kochendorf Nord station, which had sidings for various industrial companies. The only level crossing secured with barriers was the adjacent crossing of the L 1096 Bad Friedrichshall–Züttlingen. After 2.5 kilometers, the railway reached the Kocher behind Hagenbach, shortened a loop using the first of three truss bridges over the Kocher, and returned to the Kocher in Oedheim. To run along the route between the castle and the river, several buildings had to make way for the route.

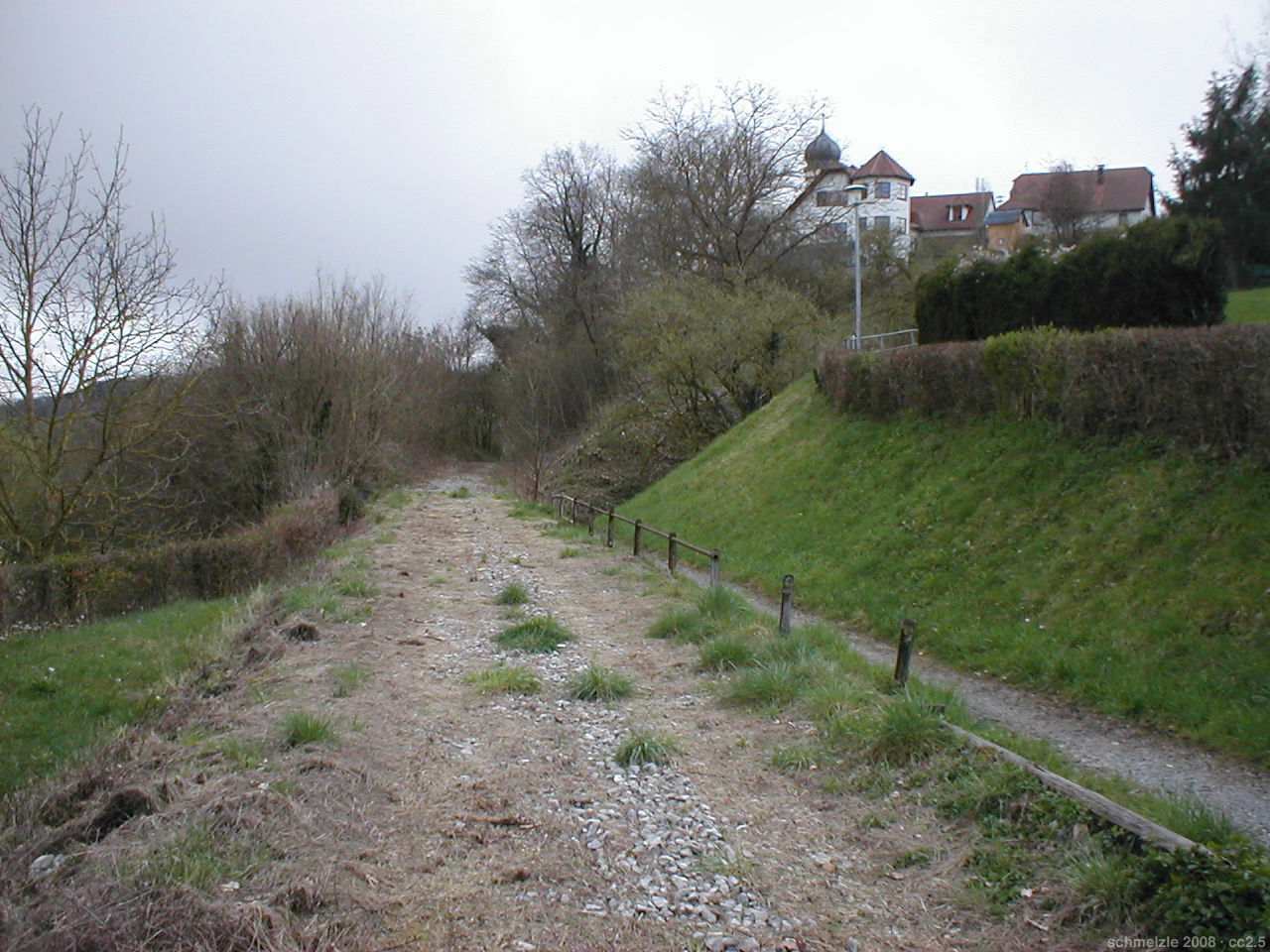
Fallow route after dismantling in Degmarn (Apr. 2008)

The route followed the following loop of the wide and not deeply cut valley to Kochertürn and thus reached Degmarn. The station building there was demolished in 1971, and the station was downgraded to a halt in 1981. The train station of Kochertürn was opposite the village and could be reached via a bridge. At Neuenstadt West, located at the mouth of the Brettach, the railway line had to be secured by extensive retaining walls to the Kocher. The following station of Neuenstadt, with its spacious station building, was located below the town near the Kocher.

Following the second Kocher bridge, the railway passed under the Kochertal bridge of the A 81 and reached Gochsen. The following stations of Kochersteinsfeld and Möglingen were close to the slope of the Kocher Valley. Before Ohrnberg, the line changed sides of the river for the last time. In Ohrnberg, today a district of Öhringen, the facilities for the maintenance of the vehicles were located. In the large station building, offices were available.

Course of the Lower Kocher Valley Railway (1993)

Characteristic of the Lower Kocher Valley Railway between Bad Friedrichshall-Jagstfeld and Neuenstadt were the station buildings in half-timbered clinker brick construction with service and waiting rooms as well as goods sheds. The buildings of the extension to Ohrnberg were kept much simpler. The buildings in Kochendorf Nord and Degmarn, as well as the buildings in Gochsen and Möglingen, were each identical.

== Relics ==
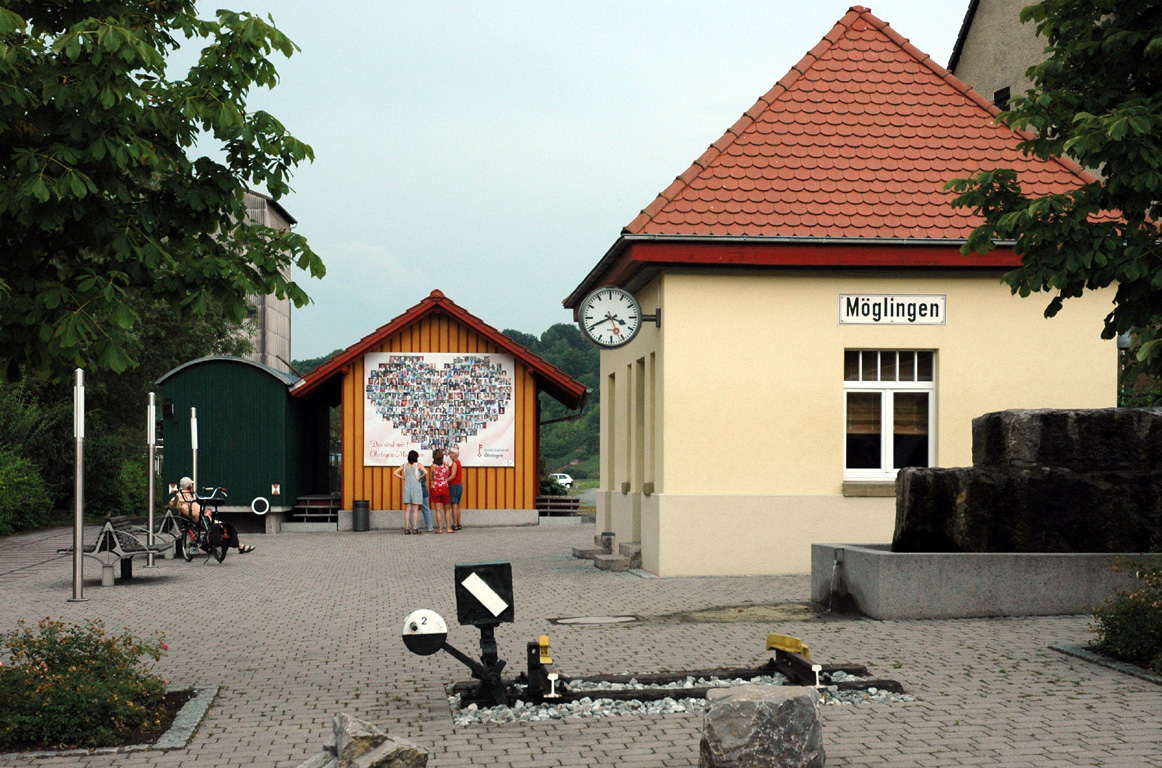
Former stop in Möglingen, today village square (July 2008)

Seven of the nine station buildings are still preserved today (as of 2011). The Oedheim building is still inhabited and has been located in the middle of a wasteland since the dismantling of the line. There are still no concrete plans on the part of the municipality about future use. The same applies to the currently vacant stations in Kochertürn and Neuenstadt, although the listed station building in Neuenstadt housed the management of the WEG-KVG until 2007. The station sign can still recognise the station building in Gochsen as such, and now serves as a clubhouse.

The former railway station area in Möglingen, which has been converted into a village square, is remarkable. Various railway relics, such as a carriage, a station clock, and the station sign on the former station building, point to the former railway. Today, the station building is used, among other things, as a polling station. The former station area in Ohrnberg, which is now a listed building, is home to a shop and a trade fair construction company, where old railway carriages are used as storage rooms.

== Bibliography ==
- Erlewein, Udo (1991). 125 Jahre Eisenbahn in Bad Friedrichshall. Ein Stück Heimatgeschichte [125 years of railway in Bad Friedrichshall: A piece of local history] (in German). Bad Friedrichshall: Stadt Bad Friedrichshall.
- Bürnheim, Hermann (1986). Württembergische Eisenbahn-Gesellschaft. Die Geschichte einer bedeutenden Privatbahn [Württemberg Railway Company: The History of a Significant Private Railway] (in German) (1 ed.). Stuttgart: Motorbuch Verlag. ISBN 3-613-01145-X.
- Jelen, Christian. Machel, Wolf-Dietger (ed.). "Bad Friedrichshall-Jagstfeld – Ohrnberg". Neben- und Schmalspurbahnen in Deutschland Einst & Jetzt (Loose-leaf collection) (in German). GeraNova. ISSN 0949-2143.
- Schön, Petra (2005). "Nebenbahnen im Raum Heilbronn". Die Stadtbahn Heilbronn. Schienenverkehr zwischen Eppingen und Öhringen [The Heilbronn Stadtbahn: Rail Transport between Eppingen and Öhringen] (in German). Ubstadt-Weiher: Verlag Regionalkultur. pp. 21–36. ISBN 3-89735-416-0.
- Seitz, Thomas, ed. (2007). 100 Jahre Kochertalbahn [100 Years of the Kochertalbahn]. Oedheimer Hefte (in German). Oedheim: Eigenverlag Thomas Seitz.
- Wolff, Gerd; Menges, Hans-Dieter (1995). Deutsche Klein- und Privatbahnen. Band 3: Württemberg [German Small and Private Railways. Volume 3: Württemberg] (in German). Freiburg: EK-Verlag. ISBN 3-88255-655-2.
