= Württemberg =

Württemberg Württeberg (Swabian)
- Historical region of Germany
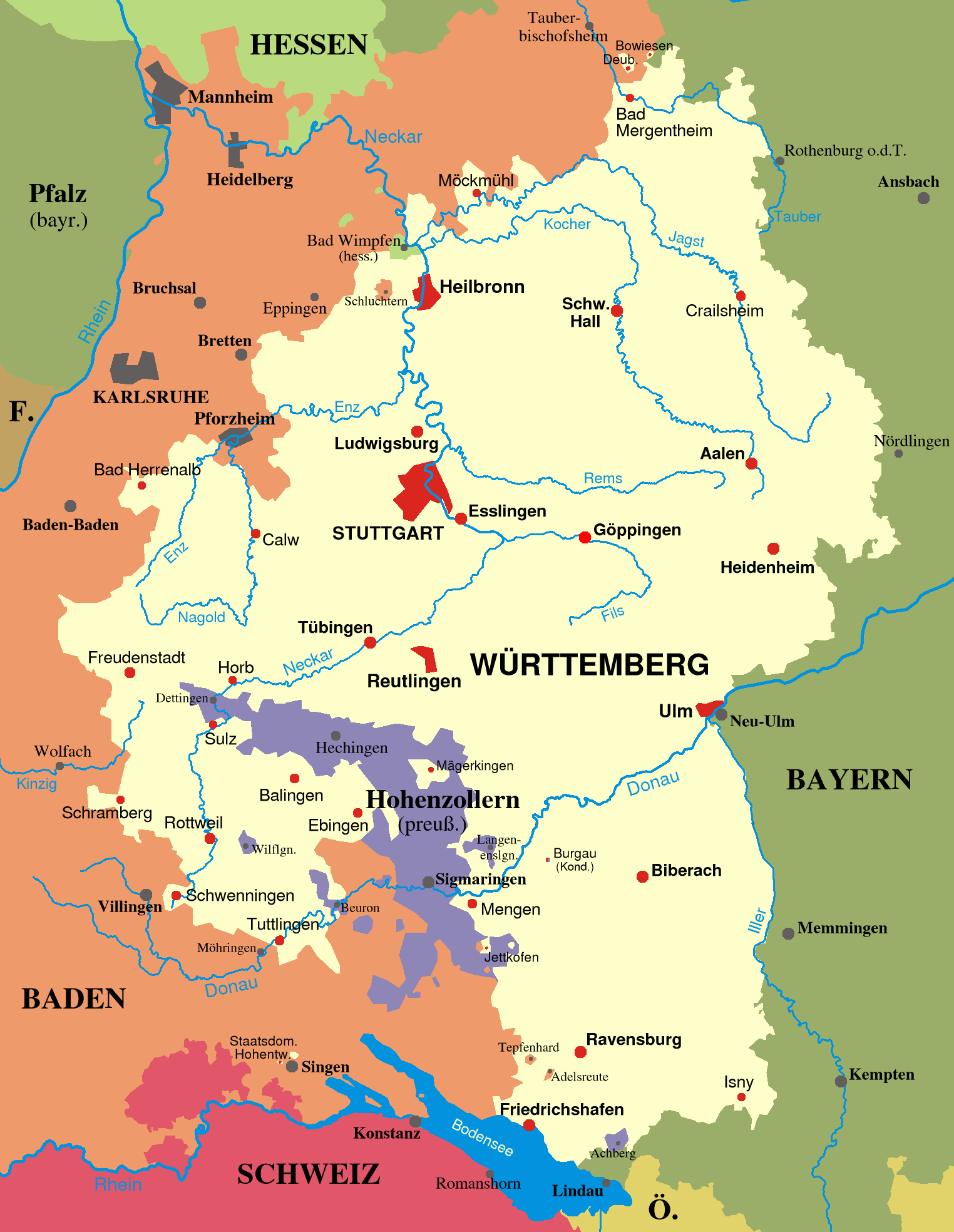
- Map depicting the territory of the Kingdom of Württemberg between 1810 and 1918.
- Country: Germany
- Largest city: Stuttgart
- Time zone: UTC+1 (CET)
  - Summer (DST): UTC+2 (CEST)

Württemberg (Note: /ˈwɜːrtəmbɜːrɡ/ WUR-təm-burg or /ˈvɜːrtəmbɜːrɡ/ VUR-təm-burg) (German: [ˈvʏʁtəmbɛʁk]; Swabian: Württeberg) is a historical German territory roughly corresponding to the cultural and linguistic region of Swabia. The main town of the region is Stuttgart.

Together with Baden and Hohenzollern, two other historical territories, Württemberg now forms the Federal State of Baden-Württemberg. Württemberg was formerly also spelled Würtemberg and Wirtemberg.

== History ==
Originally part of the old Duchy of Swabia, its history can be summarized in the following periods:

- County of Württemberg (1083–1495)
- Duchy of Württemberg (1495–1803)
- Electorate of Württemberg (1803–1806)
- Kingdom of Württemberg (1806–1918)
- Free People's State of Württemberg (1918–1945)

After World War II, it was split into Württemberg-Baden and Württemberg-Hohenzollern owing to the different occupation zones of the United States and France. Finally, in 1952, it was integrated into Baden-Württemberg. Stuttgart, the historical capital city of Württemberg, became the capital of the present state.

== See also ==
- History of Württemberg
- Coat of arms of Württemberg
- List of states in the Holy Roman Empire
- Province of Hohenzollern
- Lower Kochertal railway
