= Schefflenz (Jagst) =

River in Germany

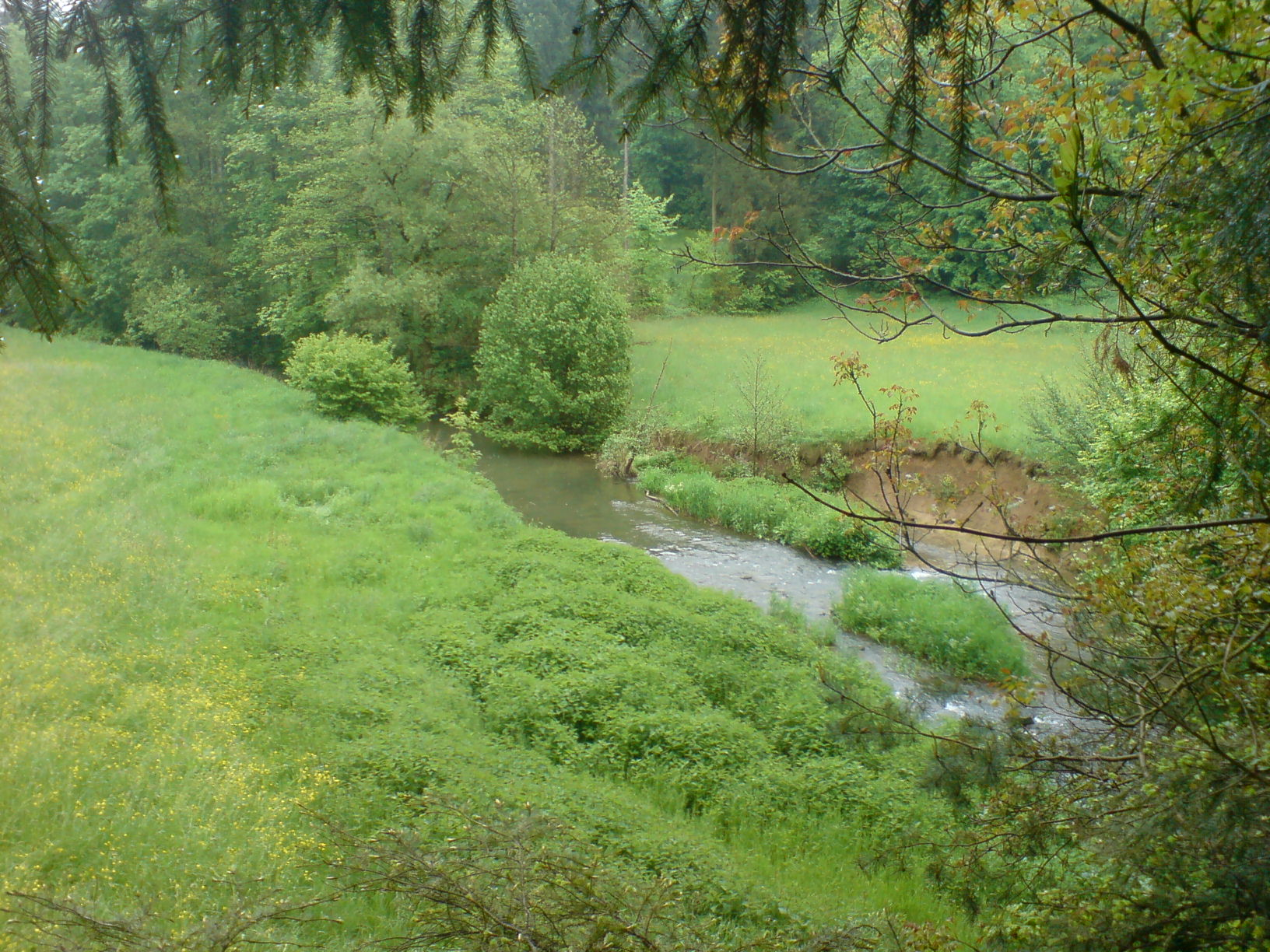

Location
- Country: Germany
- State: Baden-Württemberg

Physical characteristics
- Mouth
  - location: Jagst
  - coordinates: 49.2760°N 9.2277°E
- Length: 24.3 km (15.1 mi)

Basin features
- Progression: Jagst→ Neckar→ Rhine→ North Sea

The Schefflenz is a right tributary of the Jagst in the north of Baden-Württemberg. On its just over 24-kilometer-long course to approximately south-southwest, it crosses the Neckar-Odenwald-Kreis and the Heilbronn district.

== Name ==
The body of water was first mentioned in a document in 1338 as Schevelintz. The place of the same name Schefflenz appears in written records as early as 774 as Scaflenze. The name could be interpreted as a -nt derivation of the Proto-Indo-European verb *(s)kep-/ "to chop, to cut, to split".

== Geography ==
=== Course ===
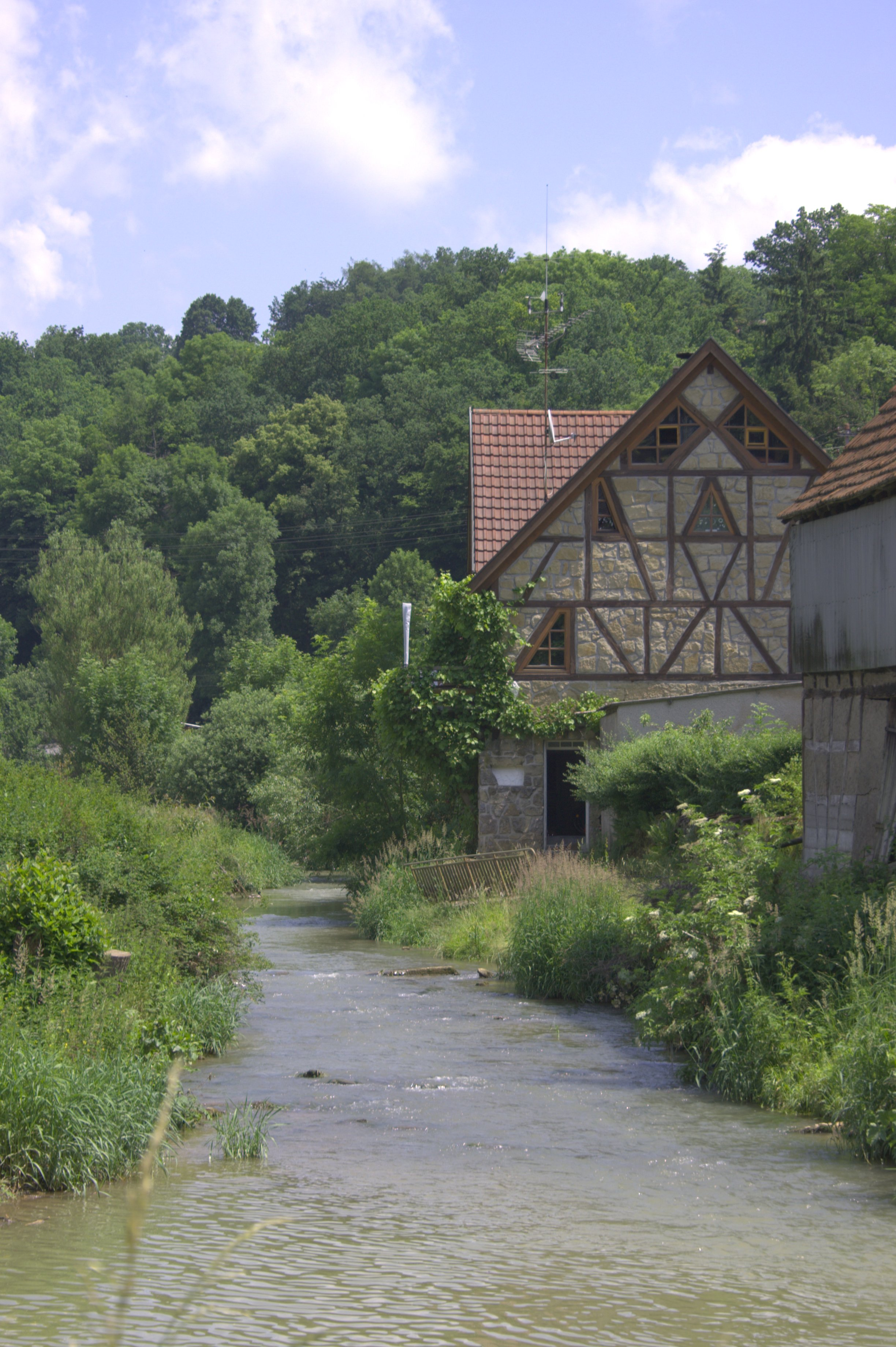
The Schefflenz in Allfeld

The Schefflenz rises immediately north of Großeicholzheim (municipality of Seckach) at about 328 m ü. NHN and then flows in a southerly direction.

It crosses the districts of the municipality of Schefflenz named after it, namely Kleineicholzheim, Ober-, Mittel- and Unterschefflenz. It then flows through the Billigheim districts of Katzental, Billigheim and Allfeld, where the longest tributary Sulzbach flows in from the right. In the lower reaches, facing southwest, it is the city border between Neudenau and Gundelsheim.

In this area, the Schefflenz flows through an idyllic meadow valley, the slopes of which are covered with forests on both sides. North of Untergriesheim, it flows into the lower reaches of the Jagst at 151.0 m. NHN as the last significant tributary. Geologically speaking, the Schefflenz flows in the layers of Muschelkalk.

The 24,289 km long course of the Schefflenz ends approximately 177 meters below its source, so it has an average stream gradient of approximately 7.3 ‰.

=== Catchment area ===
The catchment area of the Schefflenz covers around 97 km². Although it is only a few kilometers wide along its course, the stream is one of the four major tributaries of the Jagst on its lower reaches, and the fourth largest overall, after the Seckach and the Erlenbach and before the Kessach. In the west, the catchment area is bordered by that of the Elz, in the north and east by that of the Seckach. The only tributary (including the upper reaches) that is more than 5 km long is the Sulzbach in Allfeld. At the gauge there, the average discharge of the Schefflenz is 0.53 m³/s with a catchment area of 60 km². In addition to the towns directly on the river, the catchment area also includes the villages of Sulzbach, Waldmühlbach (both in the municipality of Billigheim), and a large part of Höchstberg (municipality of Gundelsheim).

At just under 392 DE-NHN, the above-ground catchment area reaches its greatest height on the northern watershed in the Spitzenwald, north of Großeicholzheim.

=== Tributaries ===
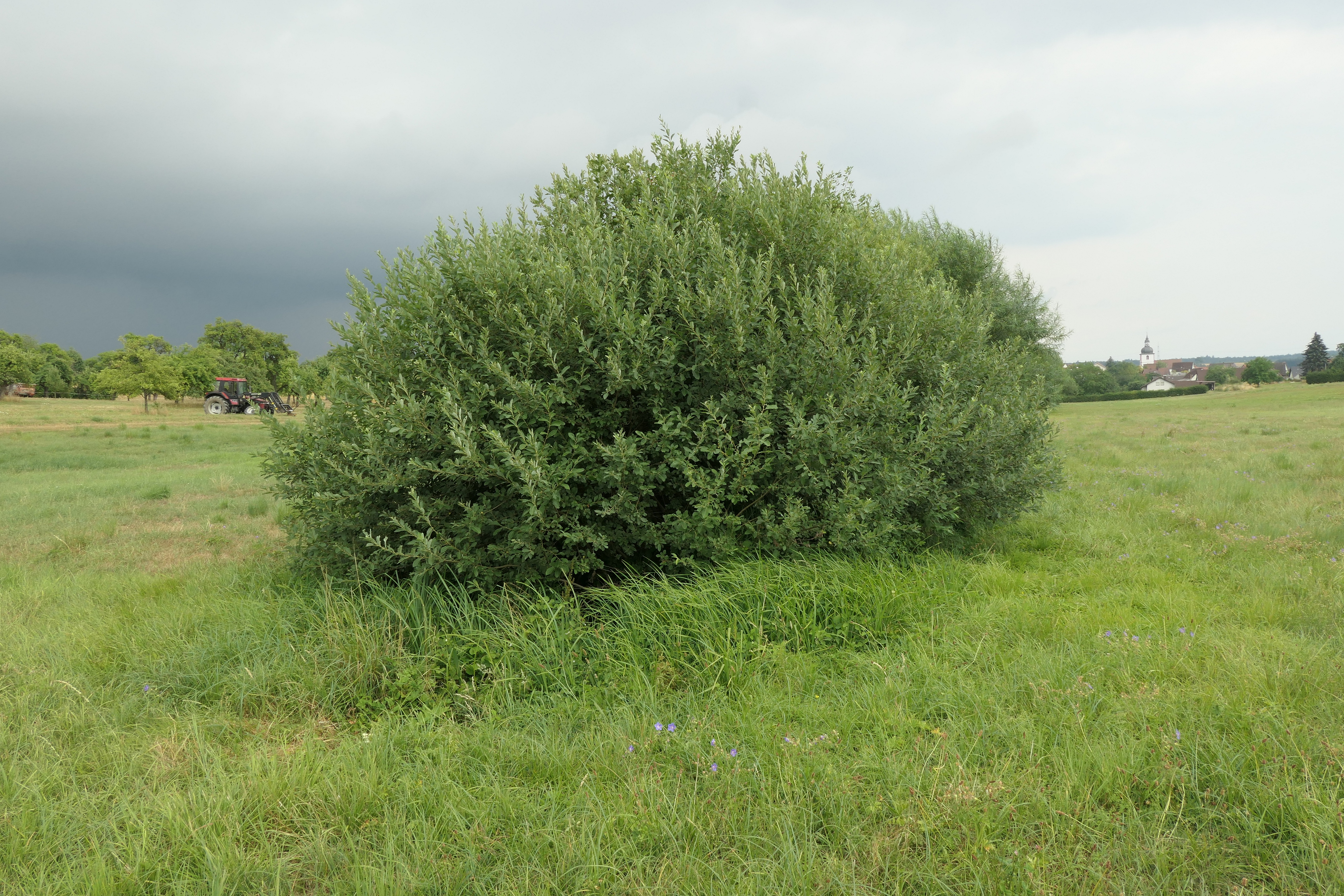
Spring of the river Schefflenz

List of direct tributaries, lakes, and flood retention basins from the source to the mouth. References for the data, where available, can be found in the respective articles; otherwise, stream length, (Note: Length according to the Water Network (Official Digital Hydrological Water Network) layer.) lake area, (Note: Lake area according to the Standing Water Bodies layer.) catchment area, (Note: Catchment area according to the Base Catchment Area layer.) and elevation (Note: Elevation based on the gray labeling in the background layer in the Topographische Karte.) are based on the corresponding layers of the LUBW online map. Other sources for the data are noted.
Selection.

- Götzenbrunnen, from the left and northwest in Seckach-Großeicholzheim, 0.4 km. The Schefflenz is culverted shortly before the confluence.
- Passes a pond on the right along its course between Groß- and Kleineicholzheim, 0.5 km
- Eberbach, from the right and northwest in Schefflenz-Kleineicholzheim, 2.5 km
- Frankenbach, from the left and northeast before Schefflenz-Oberschefflenz, 0.8 km
- Flows through the Zehnwiesen flood retention basin, built in 2002, before the upper edge of Oberschefflenz. The basin has an earth dam 5.9 m high and a retention volume of 48,000 m³, which is released in a controlled manner. No permanent impoundment. (Note: Data for the flood retention basin from the Reservoir layer.)
- Weihergraben, from the right and north-northwest in Oberschefflenz, 0.8 km (Lower course culverted through the village)
- Auebächlein, from the right and north-northwest in Oberschefflenz, 3.0 km and 3.2 km²
- (Stream from the Grünegerten-Klinge), from the left and east between Ober- and Mittelschefflenz, approx. 0.6 km (Note: Length measured on the background layer in the Topographic Map.)
- Flows through the Zehnwiesen flood retention basin, built in 2004, before the upper edge of Mittelschefflenz. The basin has an earth dam 7 m high and a retention volume of 42,700 m³, which is released in a controlled manner. No permanent impoundment.
- Safferackergraben, from the right at the entrance of Schefflenz-Mittelschefflenz, 0.6 km
- Kertelgraben, from the left and east-northeast in Mittelschefflenz, 2.8 km and 3.5 km²
- Hoheweidenbach, from the right and northeast at 263.9 m above NHN (Note: Elevation based on the gray labeling in the background layer in the Topographic Map.) between Mittelschefflenz and Schefflenz-Unterschefflenz, 1.3 km and 1.4 km²
- Flows through the Oberes Wiesental flood retention basin, built in 2006, before the upper edge of Katzental. The basin has an earth dam 8.4 m high and a retention volume of 164,000 m³, which is released in a controlled manner. No permanent impoundment.
- Sulzbach, from the right and northwest at approx. 210 m above NHN in Allfeld, 3.5 km and approx. 6.7 km including the official right-hand upper course Moostalbächle as well as 19.3 km².
- Löchlesgraben, from the right and north-northwest near Gundelsheim-Höchstberg, 0.8 km
- Mühlkanal Bachmühle, short right-hand distributary, 0.6 km

== Flood protection ==
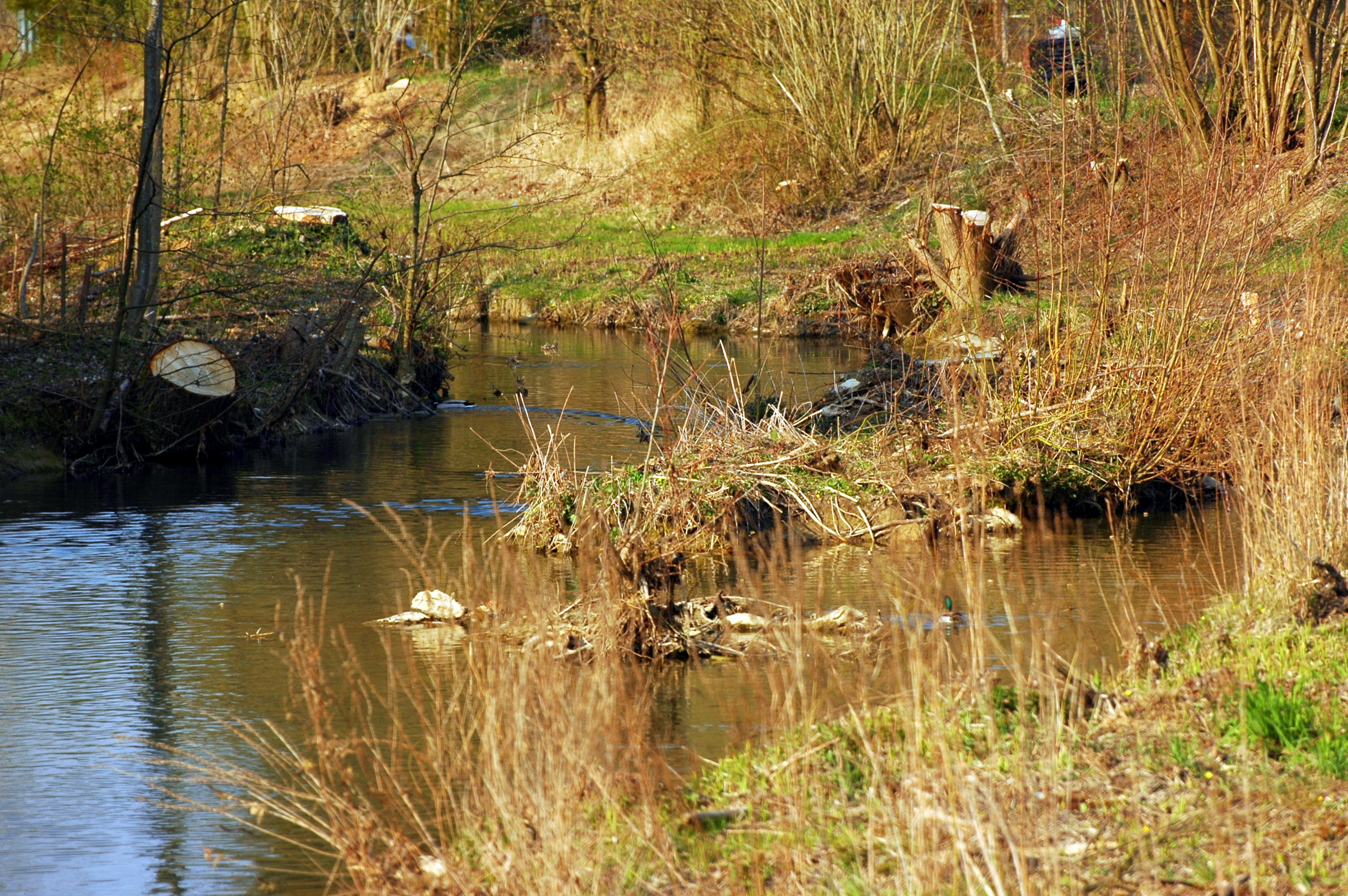
Schefflenz in Billigheim

After the floods in December 1993 and January 1995, the communities of Billigheim and Schefflenz felt compelled to found the Schefflenztal Flood Protection Association. To protect against a 100-year flood event, three retention basins were built that are effective in the area:

- Oberschefflenz-Zehntwiesen, storage target 47800 m³, controlled basin.
- Mittelschefflenz-Schendelwiesen, storage target 44000 m³, controlled basin with weather station.
- Katzental-Oberes Wiesental, storage target 152900 m³, controlled basin with weather station.

== Transport route ==
The Schefflenz Valley is of comparatively little importance for transport. It is crossed by the state roads L520/L526 along its entire length and crossed by the Neckarelz–Osterburken railway near Oberschefflenz and Kleineicholzheim. Between 1908 and 1965, the Schefflenz Valley Railway also opened up the section from Oberschefflenz to Billigheim.

== See also ==
- List of rivers of Baden-Württemberg
