= Heidelsgraben =

River in Germany

Location
- Country: Germany
- States: Baden-Württemberg

Physical characteristics
- Mouth
  - location: Hergstbach
  - coordinates: 49.3693°N 9.4169°E

Basin features
- Progression: Hergstbach→ Jagst→ Neckar→ Rhine→ North Sea

Heidelsgraben is a small river of Baden-Württemberg, Germany. It flows into the Hergstbach in Leibenstadt.

== See also ==
- List of rivers of Baden-Württemberg
