= Sindelbach =

Sindelbach may refer to:

- Sindelbach (Jagst), a river of Baden-Württemberg, Germany, tributary of the Jagst
- Sindelbach (Körsch), a river of Baden-Württemberg, Germany, headstream of the Körsch
