= Buchbach (Speltach) =

River in Germany

Location
- Country: Germany
- State: Baden-Württemberg

Physical characteristics
- Mouth
  - location: Speltach
  - coordinates: 49.1026°N 9.9793°E

Basin features
- Progression: Speltach→ Jagst→ Neckar→ Rhine→ North Sea

The Buchbach (German pronunciation: [ˈbuːxbax]) is a river in Baden-Württemberg, Germany. It is a headstream of the Speltach.

== See also ==
- List of rivers of Baden-Württemberg
