= Lanzenbach (Speltach) =

River of Baden-Württemberg, Germany

Location
- Country: Germany
- State: Baden-Württemberg

Physical characteristics
- Mouth
  - location: Speltach
  - coordinates: 49.1026°N 9.9793°E

Basin features
- Progression: Speltach→ Jagst→ Neckar→ Rhine→ North Sea

Lanzenbach is a river of Baden-Württemberg, Germany. It is a left tributary of the Speltach near Frankenhardt.

== See also ==
- List of rivers of Baden-Württemberg
