= Tierbach (Ette) =

River in Germany

Location
- Country: Germany
- State: Baden-Württemberg

Physical characteristics
- Mouth
  - location: Ette
  - coordinates: 49.3466°N 9.8850°E

Basin features
- Progression: Ette→ Jagst→ Neckar→ Rhine→ North Sea

Tierbach is a river of Baden-Württemberg, Germany. It is the left headstream of the Ette (the Eselsbach is the right one).

== See also ==
- List of rivers of Baden-Württemberg
