= Harthausen Forest =

Forested area in Germany

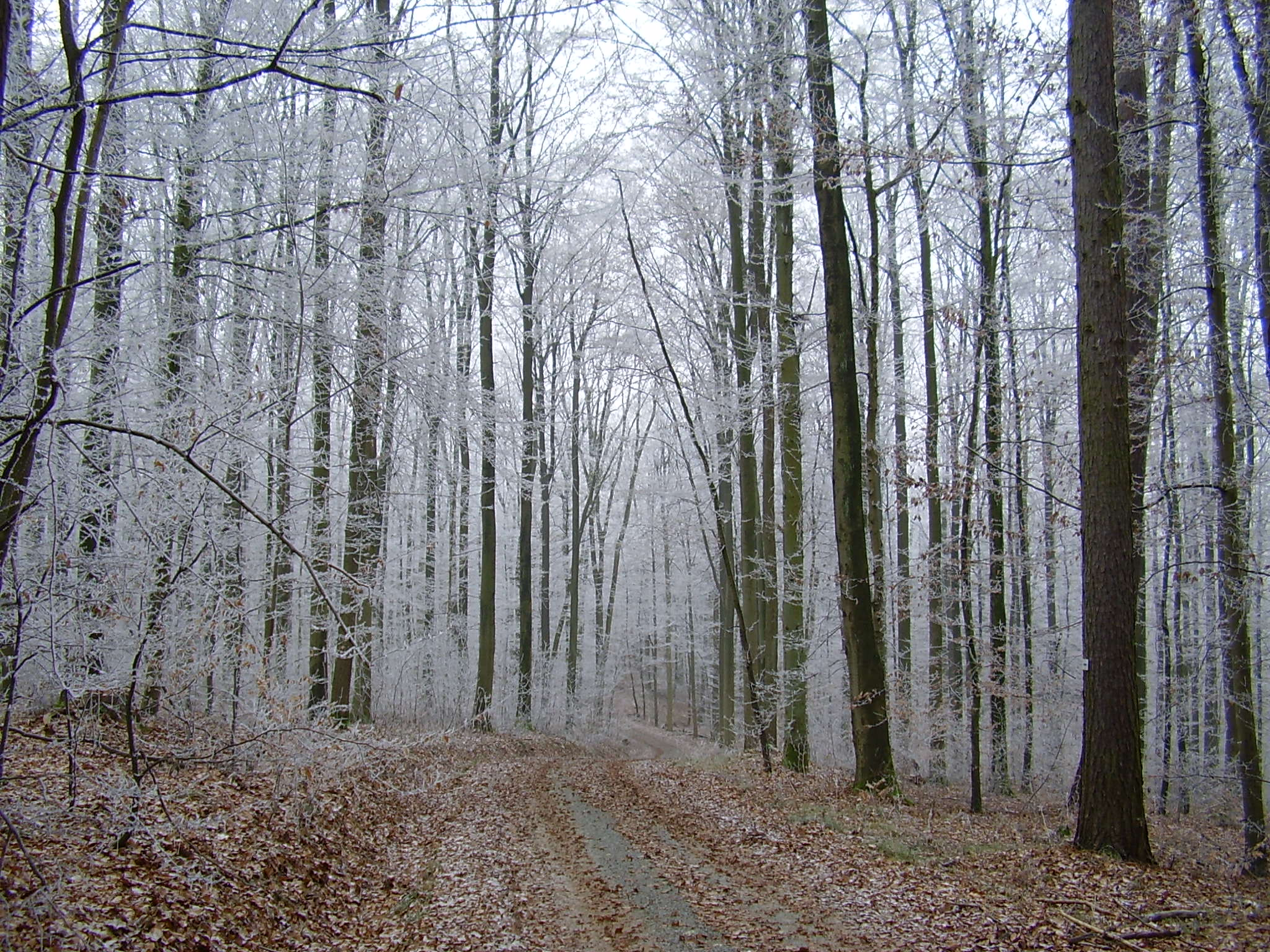

Highest point
- Peak: Unnamed summit
- Elevation: 334 m above sea level (NN)

Geography
- Location within Baden-Württemberg
- Location: Counties of Heilbronn and Hohenlohe; Baden-Württemberg, Germany
- Range coordinates: 49°18′00″N 9°23′14″E

The Harthausen Forest (German: Harthäuser Wald) is a large forested area that – depending on the definition used – is 20 to over 30 km² in area. It lies in the north of Baden-Württemberg between the valleys of the lower reaches of the Jagst and Kocher on a hill ridge which is up to 334 m above sea level (NN). The largest part of the forest lies on the territory of Hardthausen am Kocher and thus in the county of Heilbronn district, a smaller part in the east is in Hohenlohekreis district.

The forest derives its name from the settlement Harthausen near Lampoldshausen which was abandoned in the Late Middle Ages.

== Location ==
The Harthausen Forest lies between the lower courses of the Jagst and Kocher. The towns and villages of Möckmühl, Widdern, Jagsthausen, Öhringen, Hardthausen am Kocher, Neuenstadt am Kocher and Neudenau (in clockwise order) have shares in the forest region. Apart from Öhringen, which belongs to Hohenlohekreis, all of them are in the county of Heilbronn. 80% of the forest is in the municipality of Hardthausen am Kocher. In the north the forest reaches the River Jagst between Züttlingen and Olnhausen at several places. In the southeast it reaches the Kocher between Sindringen and Ohrnberg.

The Harthausen Forest lies at elevations of roughly between 180 and 334 m above NN. These maximum heights are attained on the Landesstraße L 1047 between its bridge over the motorway and the Seehaus. In this area a flat hill ridge runs eastwards from the bridge over the A 81 to the west of Seehaus for a distance of about 2.5 kilometres with a height of around 330 m above NN on either side of the Landesstraße. This ridge forms the watershed in the forest between the nearby Jagst to the north and the Kocher to the south, much further away.

== Literature ==
- Hans Mattern: Auf Naturschutzfahrten im nördlichen Württemberg (1 und 2). In: Landesanstalt für Umweltschutz Baden-Württemberg (Hrsg.): Veröffentlichungen für Naturschutz und Landschaftspflege in Baden-Württemberg. Band 67, 1992, S. 49-96 ISSN 0342-684X (den Harthäuser Wald betreffend S. 64–65)
- Der Harthäuser Wald. In: Hardthausen in Geschichte(n) in Hardthausen. Gemeinde Hardthausen, Hardthausen am Kocher 1997. S. 193–217
