= Ginsbach =

Ginsbach may refer to:

- Ginsbach (Jagst), a river of Baden-Württemberg, Germany, tributary of the Jagst near Krautheim
- Oberginsbach, a former municipality of Baden-Württemberg, Germany, now part of Krautheim
- Unterginsbach, a former municipality of Baden-Württemberg, Germany, now part of Krautheim
