= Brettach =

Brettach may refer to:

- Brettach (Jagst), a river in Baden-Württemberg, Germany, tributary of the Jagst
- Brettach (Kocher), a river in Baden-Württemberg, Germany, tributary of the Kocher
