= Röhlinger Sechta =

River in Germany

Location
- Country: Germany
- State: Baden-Württemberg

Physical characteristics
- Mouth
  - location: Jagst
  - coordinates: 48.9211°N 10.1463°E
- Length: 20.8 km (12.9 mi)

Basin features
- Progression: Jagst→ Neckar→ Rhine→ North Sea

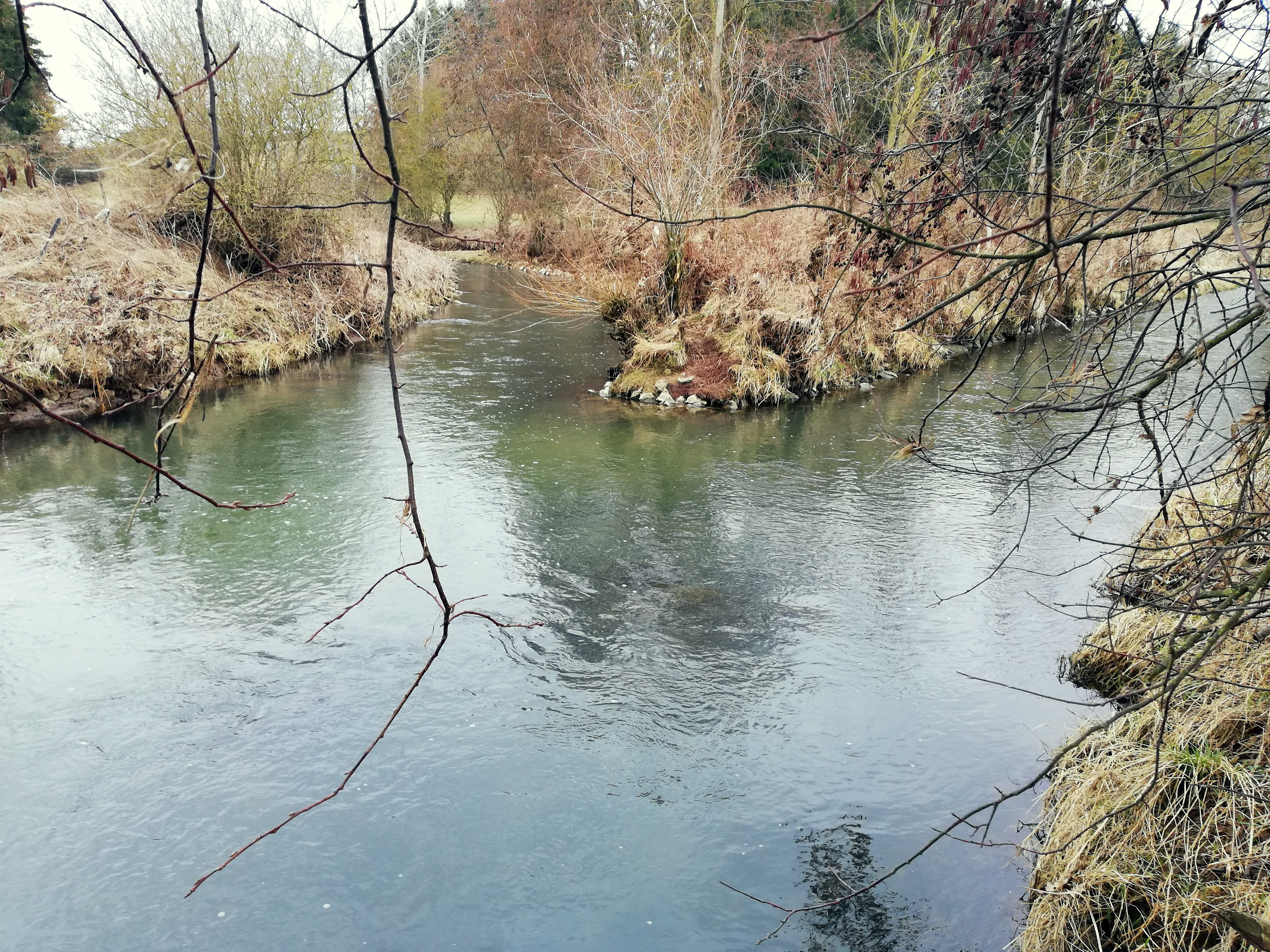

The Röhlinger Sechta is a river of Baden-Württemberg, Germany. It flows into the Jagst near Rainau.

== See also ==
- List of rivers of Baden-Württemberg
