= Grundbach (Jagst) =

River in Baden-Württemberg, Germany

Location
- Country: Germany
- States: Baden-Württemberg

Physical characteristics
- Mouth
  - location: Jagst
  - coordinates: 49.1880°N 10.0098°E

Basin features
- Progression: Jagst→ Neckar→ Rhine→ North Sea

The Grundbach is a river of Baden-Württemberg, Germany. It flows into the Jagst near Kirchberg an der Jagst.

== See also ==
- List of rivers of Baden-Württemberg
