= Rotenbach (Jagst) =

River in Baden-Württemberg, Germany

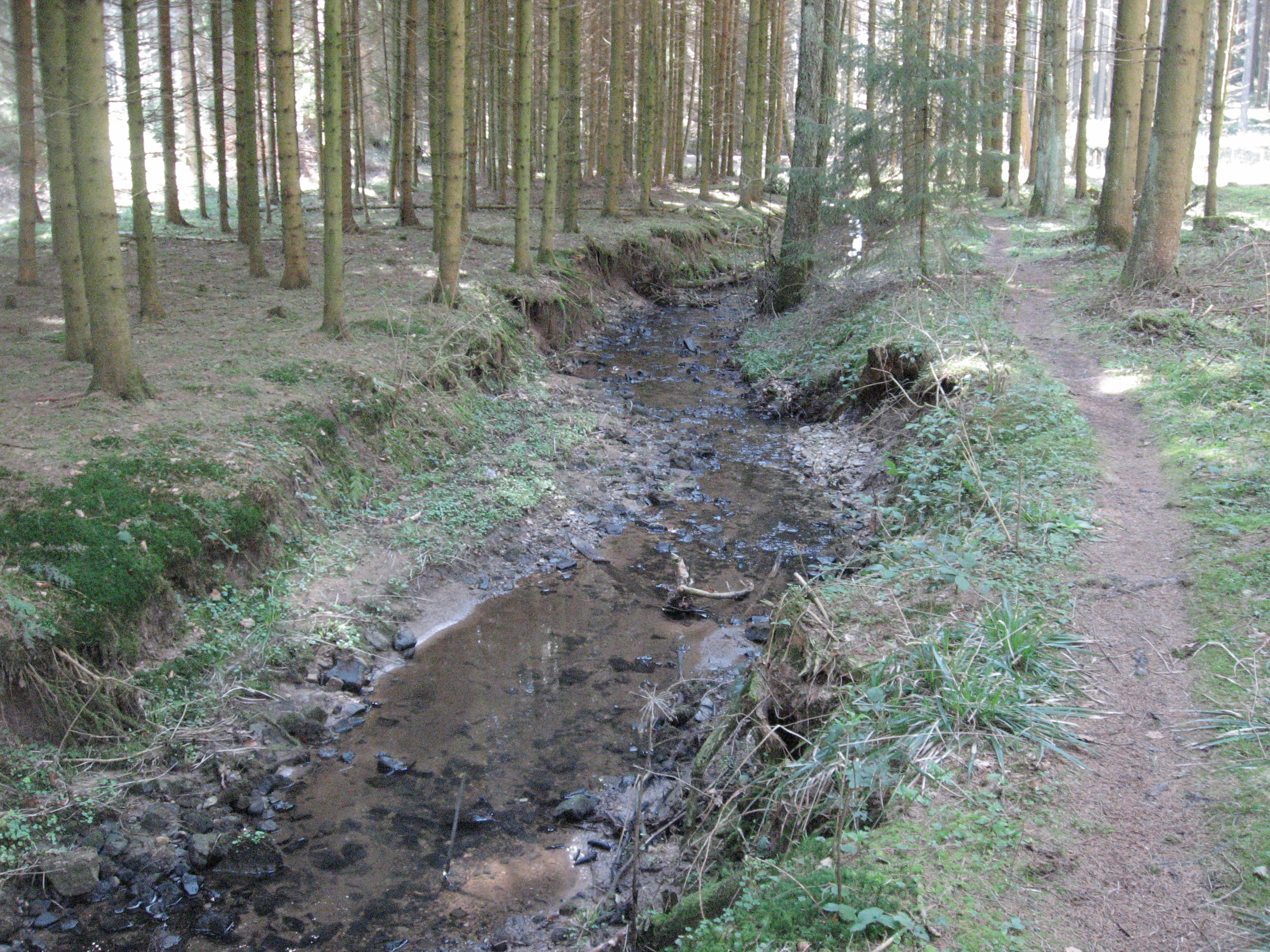

Location
- Country: Germany
- States: Baden-Württemberg

Physical characteristics
- Mouth
  - location: Jagst
  - coordinates: 48.9579°N 10.1160°E

Basin features
- Progression: Jagst→ Neckar→ Rhine→ North Sea

The Rotenbach is a river of Baden-Württemberg, Germany. It flows into the Jagst near Ellwangen.

== See also ==
- List of rivers of Baden-Württemberg
