= Gronach =

River in Germany

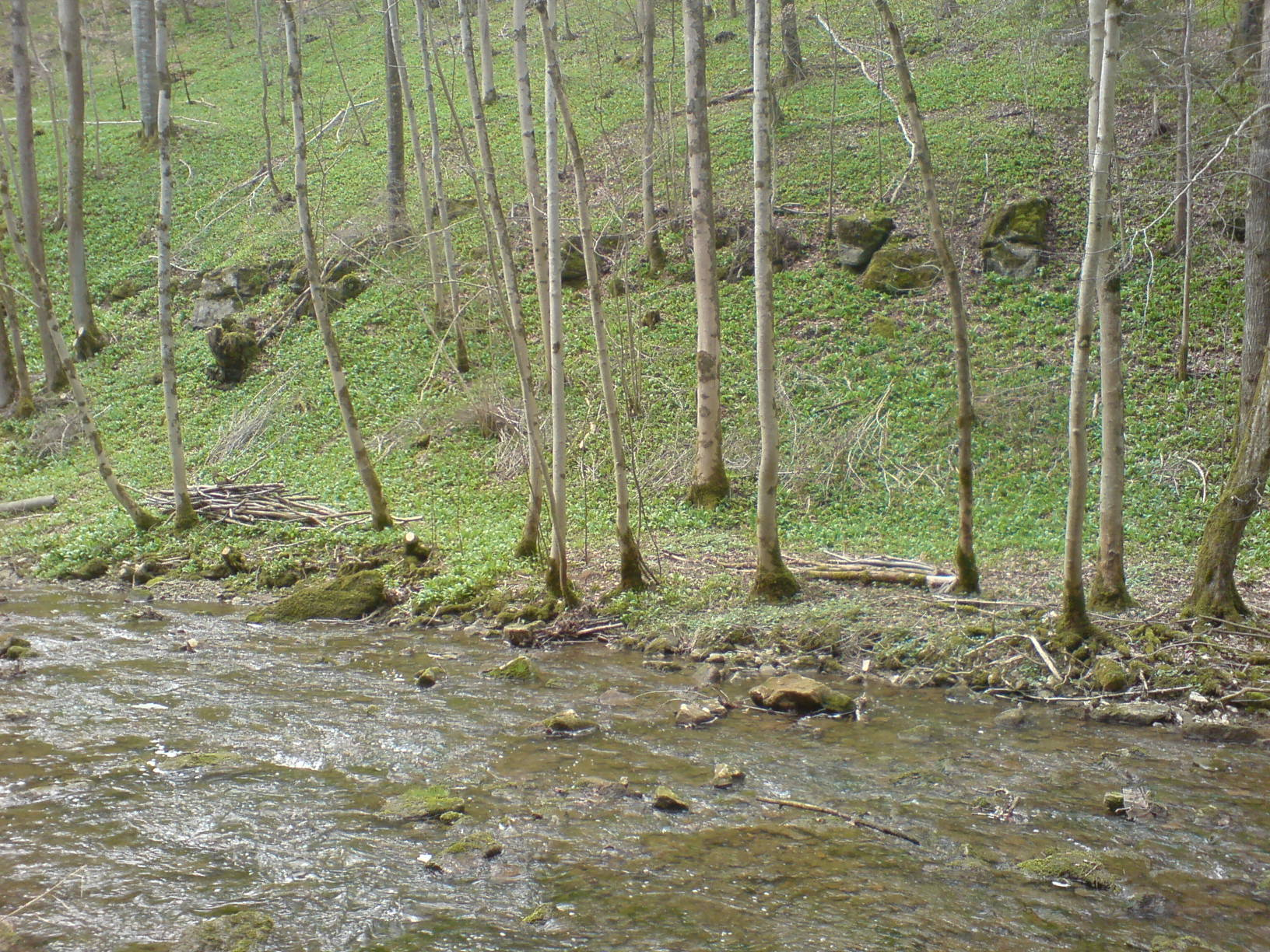

Location
- Country: Germany
- State: Baden-Württemberg

Physical characteristics
- Mouth
  - location: Jagst
  - coordinates: 49.1792°N 10.0402°E
- Length: 10.4 km (6.5 mi)

Basin features
- Progression: Jagst→ Neckar→ Rhine→ North Sea

The Gronach is a river of Baden-Württemberg, Germany. It is a tributary of the Jagst, into which flows near Satteldorf.

== See also ==
- List of rivers of Baden-Württemberg
