= Speltach =

River in Germany

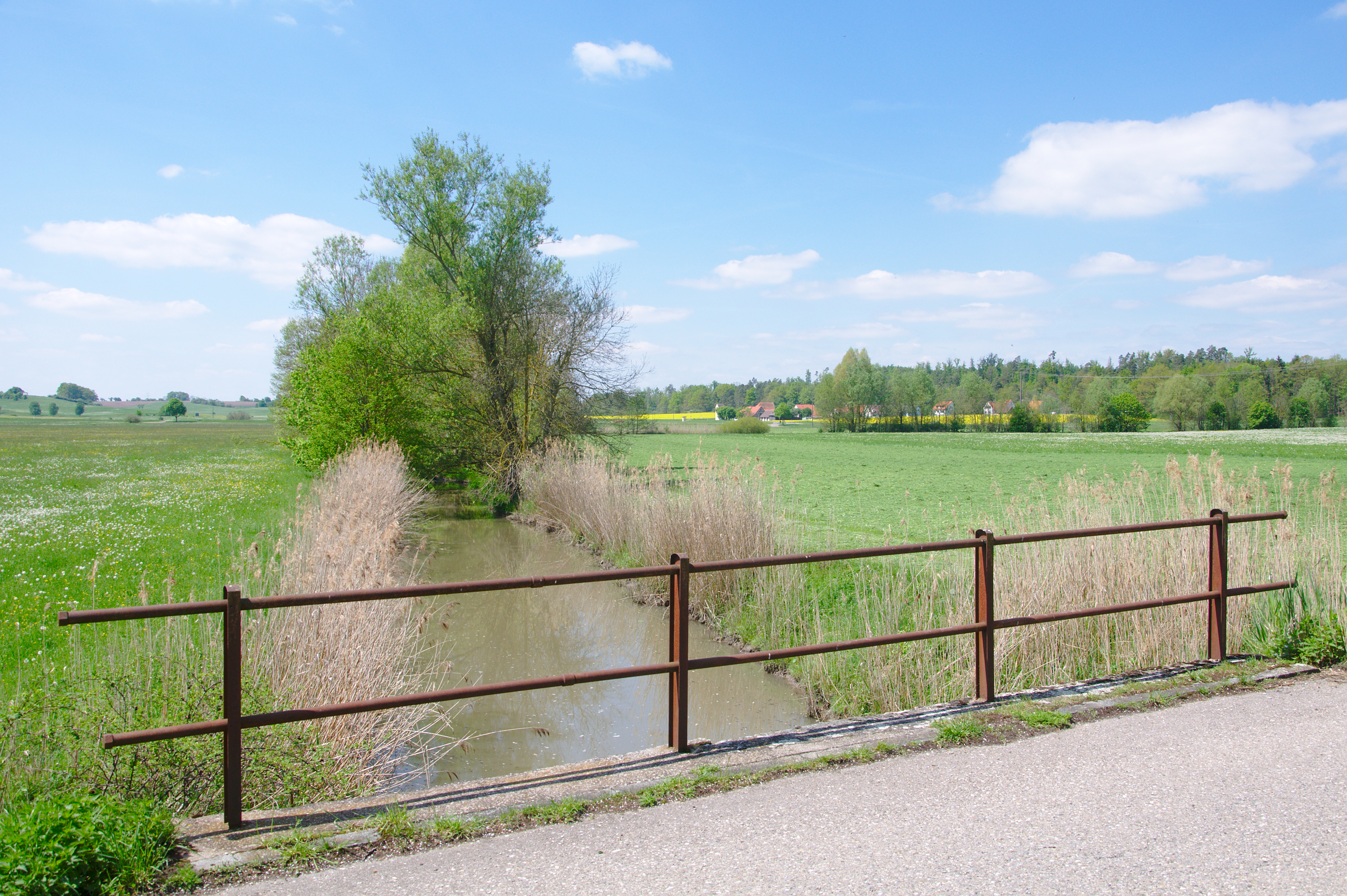

Location
- Country: Germany
- State: Baden-Württemberg

Physical characteristics
- Mouth
  - location: Jagst
  - coordinates: 49.0945°N 10.0677°E
- Length: 11.2 km (7.0 mi)

Basin features
- Progression: Jagst→ Neckar→ Rhine→ North Sea
- Tributaries
  - left: Lanzenbach
  - right: Buchbach

The Speltach is a river of Baden-Württemberg, Germany. It flows into the Jagst near Crailsheim.

== See also ==
- List of rivers of Baden-Württemberg
