= Ette (river) =

River in Germany

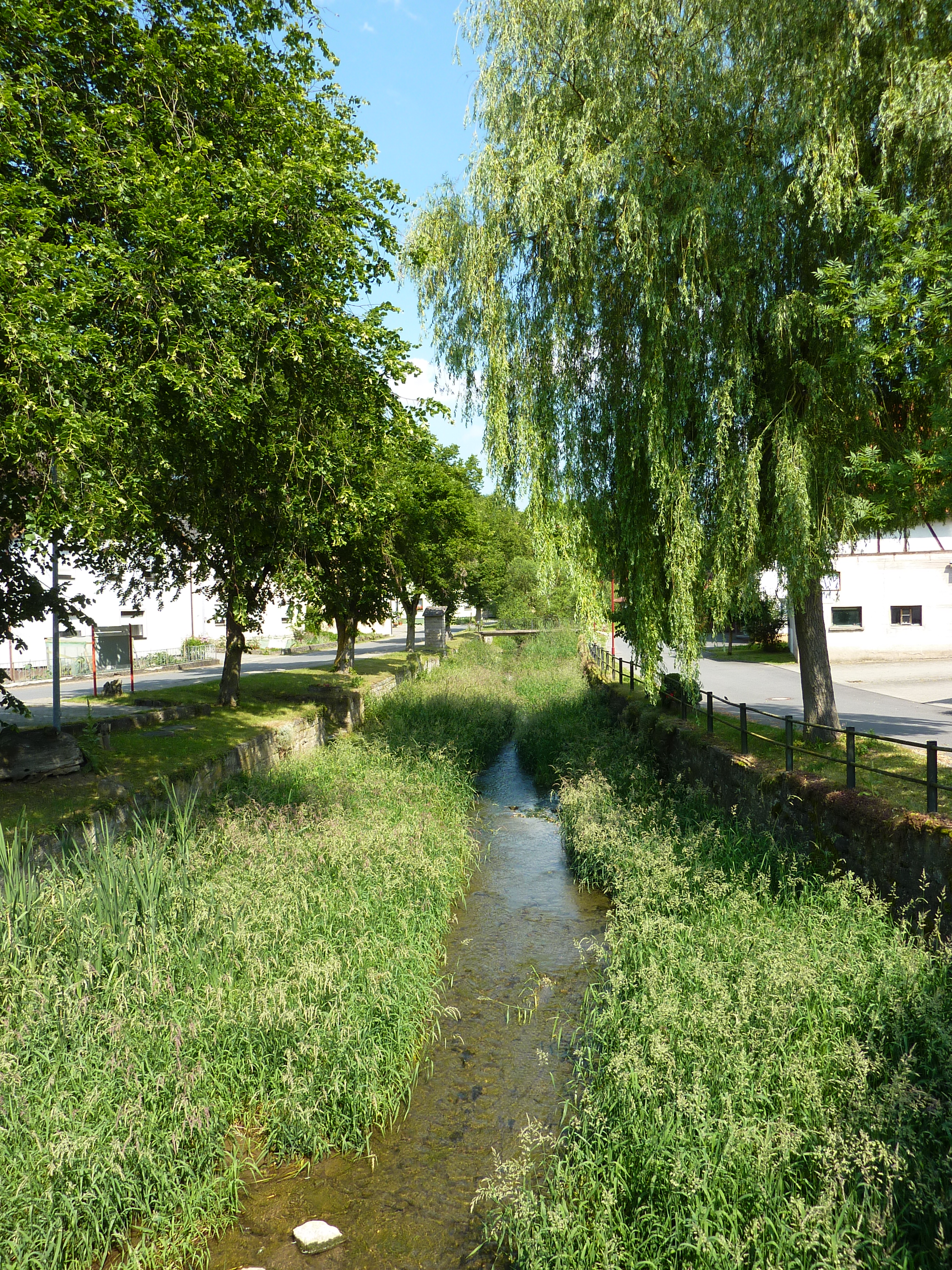

Location
- Country: Germany
- State: Baden-Württemberg

Physical characteristics
- Mouth
  - location: Jagst
  - coordinates: 49.3480°N 9.7894°E
- Length: 14.0 km (8.7 mi)

Basin features
- Progression: Jagst→ Neckar→ Rhine→ North Sea
- Tributaries
  - left: Tierbach
  - right: Eselsbach

The Ette is a river of Baden-Württemberg, Germany. It flows into the Jagst near Mulfingen. Including its source river Eselsbach, the Ette is 14 km long.

== See also ==
- List of rivers of Baden-Württemberg
