= Steinbach (Jagst) =

River in Germany

Location
- Country: Germany
- State: Baden-Württemberg

Physical characteristics
- Mouth
  - location: Jagst
  - coordinates: 49.0792°N 10.0722°E

Basin features
- Progression: Jagst→ Neckar→ Rhine→ North Sea

The Steinbach is a small river of Baden-Württemberg, Germany. It is a left tributary of the Jagst in Steinbach an der Jagst.

== See also ==
- List of rivers of Baden-Württemberg
