= Rechenberger Rot =

River in Germany

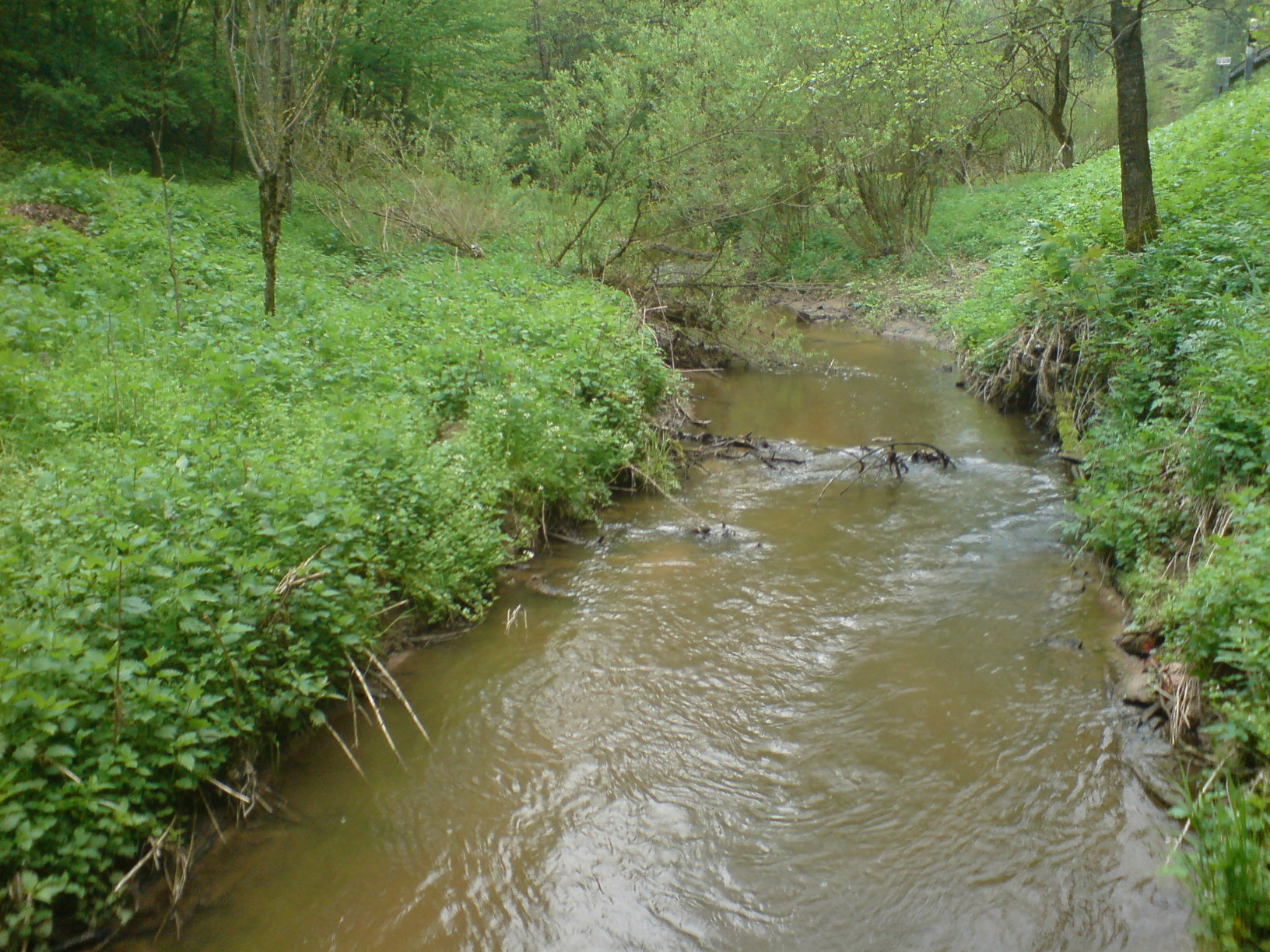

Location
- Country: Germany
- State: Baden-Württemberg

Physical characteristics
- Mouth
  - location: Jagst
  - coordinates: 49.0159°N 10.1076°E
- Length: 14.8 km (9.2 mi)

Basin features
- Progression: Jagst→ Neckar→ Rhine→ North Sea

The Rechenberger Rot is a river of Baden-Württemberg, Germany. It flows into the Jagst near Jagstzell.

== See also ==
- List of rivers of Baden-Württemberg
