= Maulach =

River in Germany

Location
- Country: Germany
- State: Baden-Württemberg

Physical characteristics
- Mouth
  - location: Jagst
  - coordinates: 49.1061°N 10.0646°E
- Length: 11.7 km (7.3 mi)

Basin features
- Progression: Jagst→ Neckar→ Rhine→ North Sea

The Maulach is a river of Baden-Württemberg, Germany. It flows into the Jagst near Crailsheim.

== See also ==
- List of rivers of Baden-Württemberg
