= Tiefenbach (Jagst) =

River in Germany

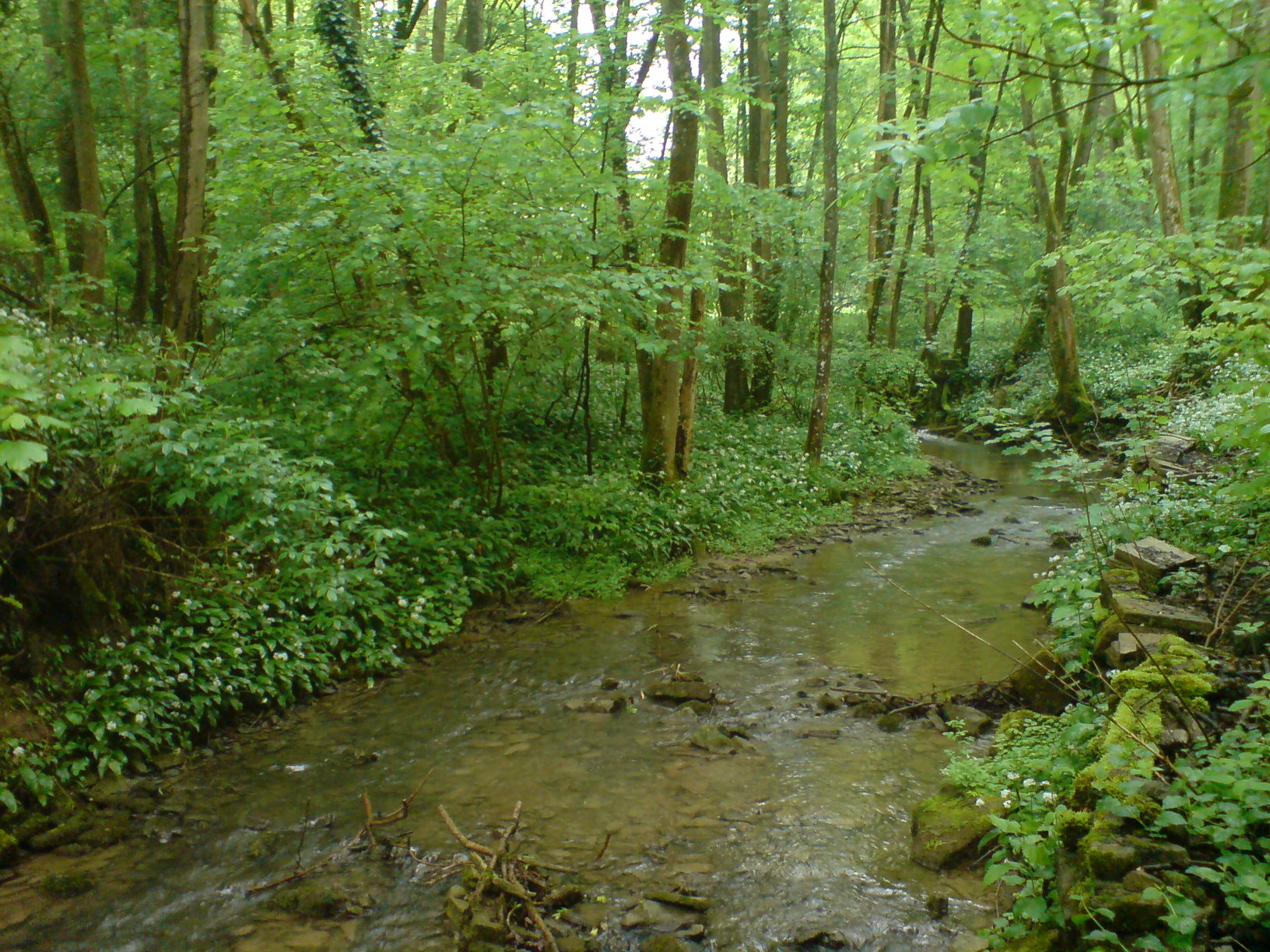

Location
- Country: Germany
- State: Baden-Württemberg

Physical characteristics
- Mouth
  - location: Jagst
  - coordinates: 49.2713°N 9.2223°E

Basin features
- Progression: Jagst→ Neckar→ Rhine→ North Sea

The Tiefenbach is a river of Baden-Württemberg, Germany. It is a tributary of the Jagst and flows into it in Untergriesheim.

== See also ==
- List of rivers of Baden-Württemberg
