= Schefflenz =

- Municipality
- Coat of arms

- Location of Schefflenz within Neckar-Odenwald-Kreis district
- Interactive map of Schefflenz
- Location within Germany Location within Baden-Württemberg
- Coordinates: 49°24′9″N 9°16′43″E
- Country: Germany
- State: Baden-Württemberg
- Admin. region: Karlsruhe
- District: Neckar-Odenwald-Kreis
- Subdivisions: 4

Government
  - Mayor (2016–24): Rainer Houck (CDU)

Area
  - Total: 36.97 km^{2} (14.27 sq mi)
- Elevation: 273 m (896 ft)

Population (2025-12-31)
  - Total: 3,964
  - Density: 107.2/km^{2} (277.7/sq mi)
- Time zone: UTC+01:00 (CET)
  - Summer (DST): UTC+02:00 (CEST)
- Postal codes: 74850
- Dialling codes: 06293
- Vehicle registration: MOS, BCH
- Website: www.schefflenz.de

Schefflenz is a town in the district of Neckar-Odenwald-Kreis, in Baden-Württemberg, Germany.
