= Erlenbach (Jagst) =

River in Germany

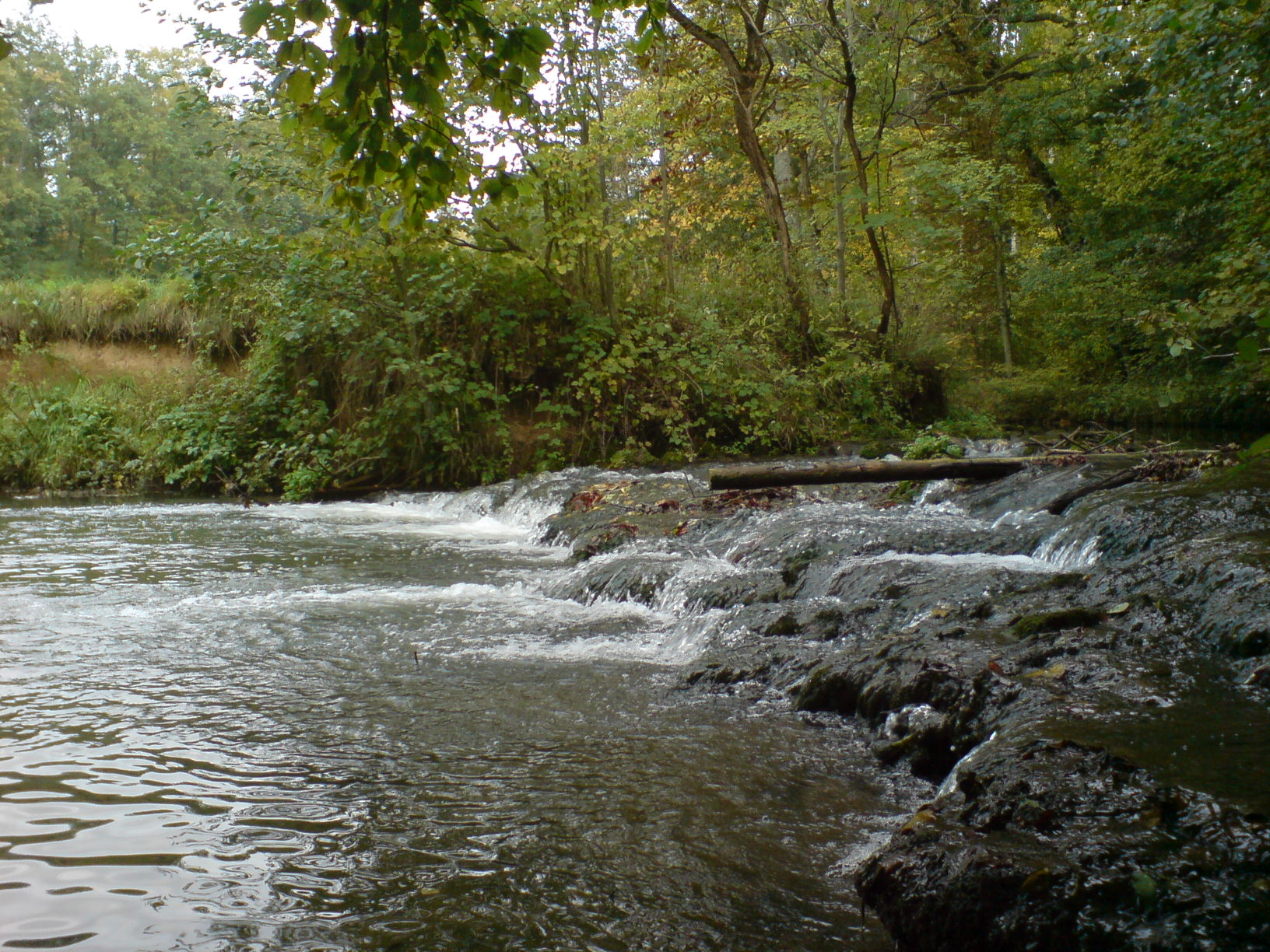

Location
- Country: Germany
- State: Baden-Württemberg

Physical characteristics
- Mouth
  - location: Jagst
  - coordinates: 49°20′34″N 9°31′40″E
- Length: 23.5 km (14.6 mi)

Basin features
- Progression: Jagst→ Neckar→ Rhine→ North Sea

The Erlenbach (German: [ˈɛʁlənbax]) is a river of Baden-Württemberg, Germany. It is a right tributary of the Jagst, which it flows into in Bieringen, a district of Schöntal.

== See also ==
- List of rivers of Baden-Württemberg
