= Hergstbach =

River in Germany

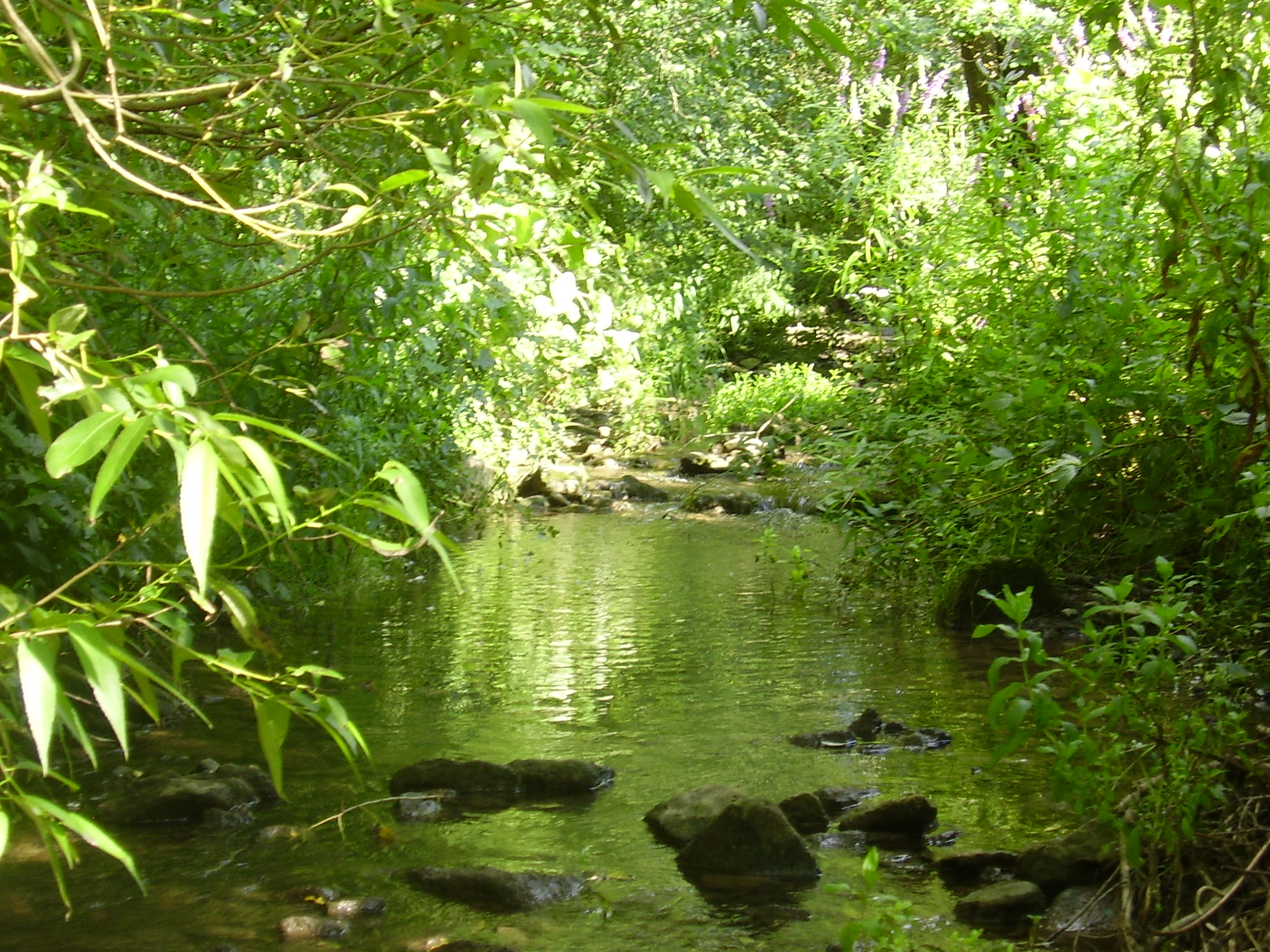

Location
- Country: Germany
- State: Baden-Württemberg

Physical characteristics
- Mouth
  - location: Jagst
  - coordinates: 49°19′09″N 9°22′32″E
- Length: 14.7 km (9.1 mi)

Basin features
- Progression: Jagst→ Neckar→ Rhine→ North Sea

The Hergstbach (in its upper course: Hergstgraben) is a river of Baden-Württemberg, Germany. The 14.7-kilometer-long river flows into the Jagst near Möckmühl.

== See also ==
- List of rivers of Baden-Württemberg
