= Brettach (Jagst) =

River in Germany

- The Brettach Valley

Location
- Country: Germany
- State: Baden-Württemberg

Physical characteristics
- Mouth
  - location: Jagst
  - coordinates: 49.2229°N 9.9084°E
- Length: 27.8 km (17.3 mi)

Basin features
- Progression: Jagst→ Neckar→ Rhine→ North Sea

The Brettach is a river in Baden-Württemberg, Germany. It flows into the Jagst near Gerabronn.

== See also ==
- List of rivers of Baden-Württemberg
