= Kessach =

River in Germany

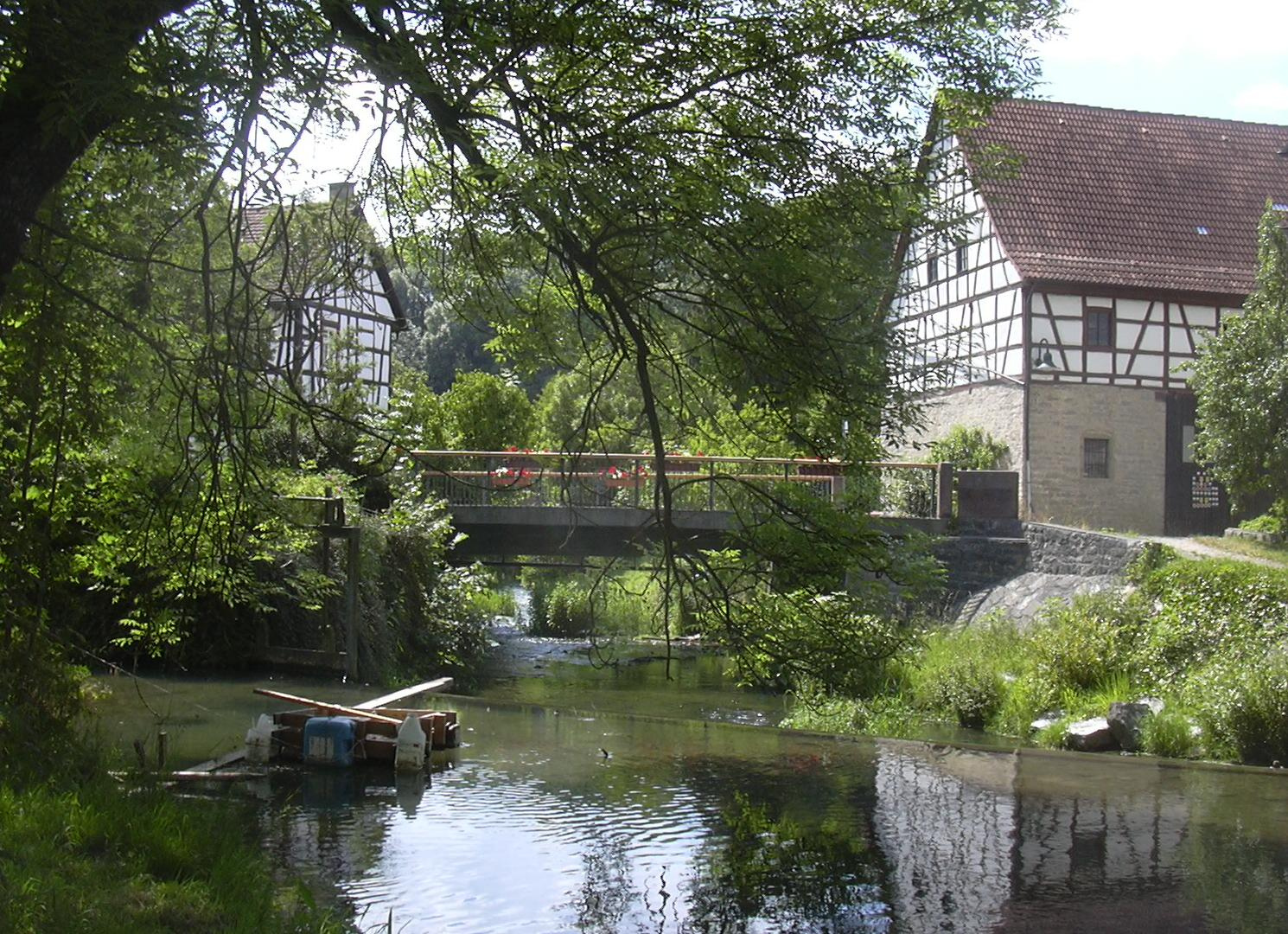
- Bridge in Unterkessach

Location
- Country: Germany
- State: Baden-Württemberg

Physical characteristics
- Mouth
  - location: Jagst
  - coordinates: 49.3167°N 9.4209°E
- Length: 24.0 km (14.9 mi)

Basin features
- Progression: Jagst→ Neckar→ Rhine→ North Sea

The Kessach is a river of Baden-Württemberg, Germany. The 24-kilometer-long river flows into the Jagst in Widdern.

== See also ==
- List of rivers of Baden-Württemberg
