= Sindelbach (Jagst) =

River in Germany

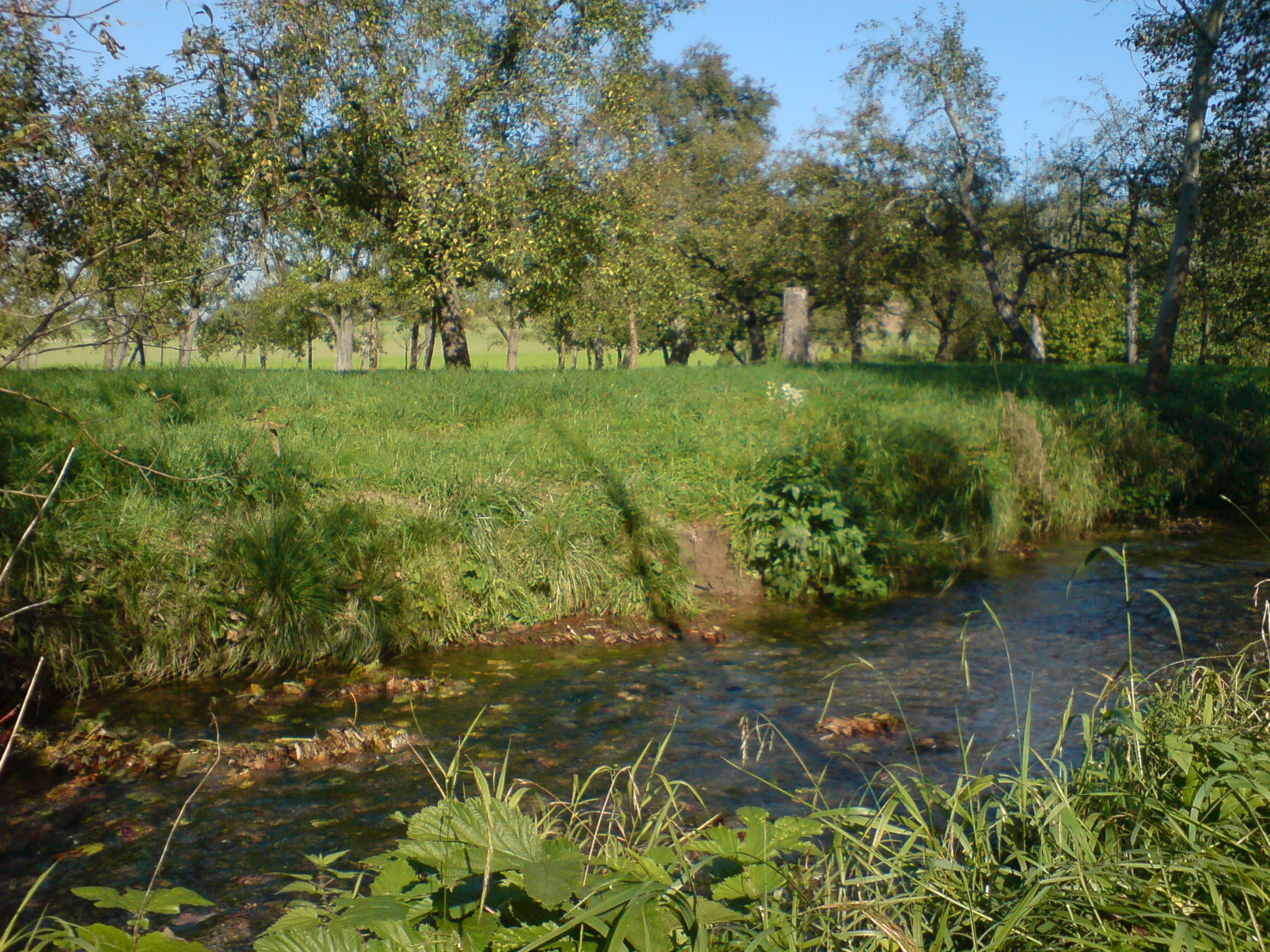

Location
- Country: Germany
- State: Baden-Württemberg

Physical characteristics
- Mouth
  - location: Jagst
  - coordinates: 49.3608°N 9.5958°E
- Length: 13.7 km (8.5 mi)

Basin features
- Progression: Jagst→ Neckar→ Rhine→ North Sea

The Sindelbach is a river of Baden-Württemberg, Germany. It flows into the Jagst near Krautheim.

== See also ==
- List of rivers of Baden-Württemberg
