= Neudenau =

- Town
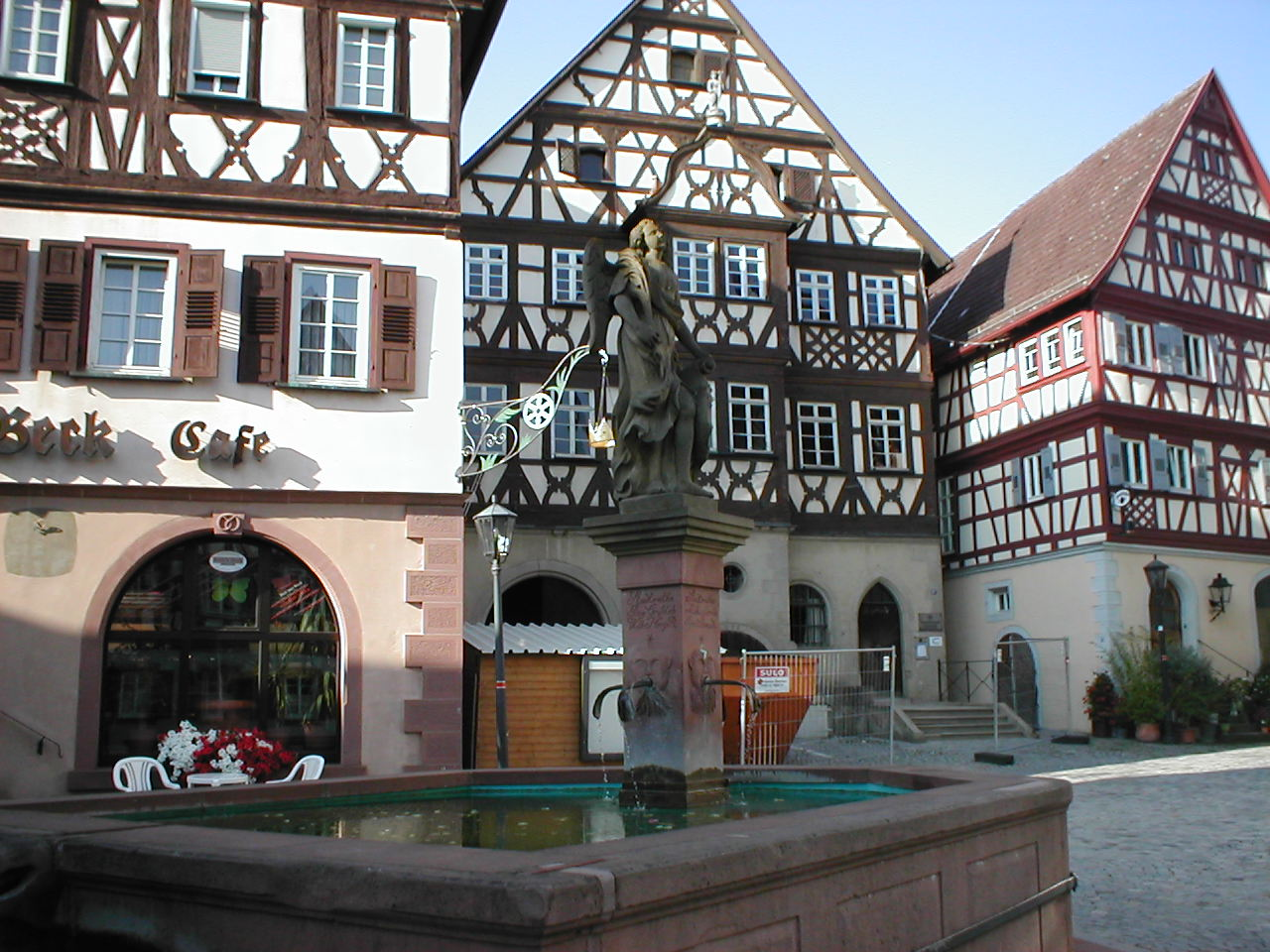
- Town hall

- Coat of arms

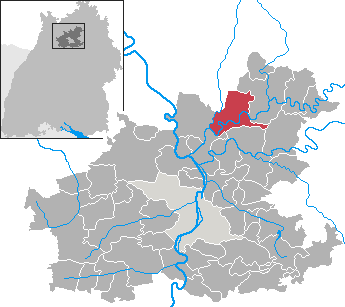
- Location of Neudenau within Heilbronn district
- Interactive map of Neudenau
- Location within Germany Location within Baden-Württemberg
- Coordinates: 49°17′N 9°16′E
- Country: Germany
- State: Baden-Württemberg
- Admin. region: Stuttgart
- District: Heilbronn
- Subdivisions: 5

Government
  - Mayor (2023–31): Jochen Hoffer

Area
  - Total: 32.93 km^{2} (12.71 sq mi)
- Elevation: 189 m (620 ft)

Population (2025-12-31)
  - Total: 5,608
  - Density: 170.3/km^{2} (441.1/sq mi)
- Time zone: UTC+01:00 (CET)
  - Summer (DST): UTC+02:00 (CEST)
- Postal codes: 74861
- Dialling codes: 06264, 06298
- Vehicle registration: HN
- Website: www.neudenau.de

Neudenau (German: [ˈnɔʏdənaʊ]) is a town in the district of Heilbronn, Baden-Württemberg, Germany. It is situated on the river Jagst, 17 km north of Heilbronn.
