= Jagst =

River in Germany

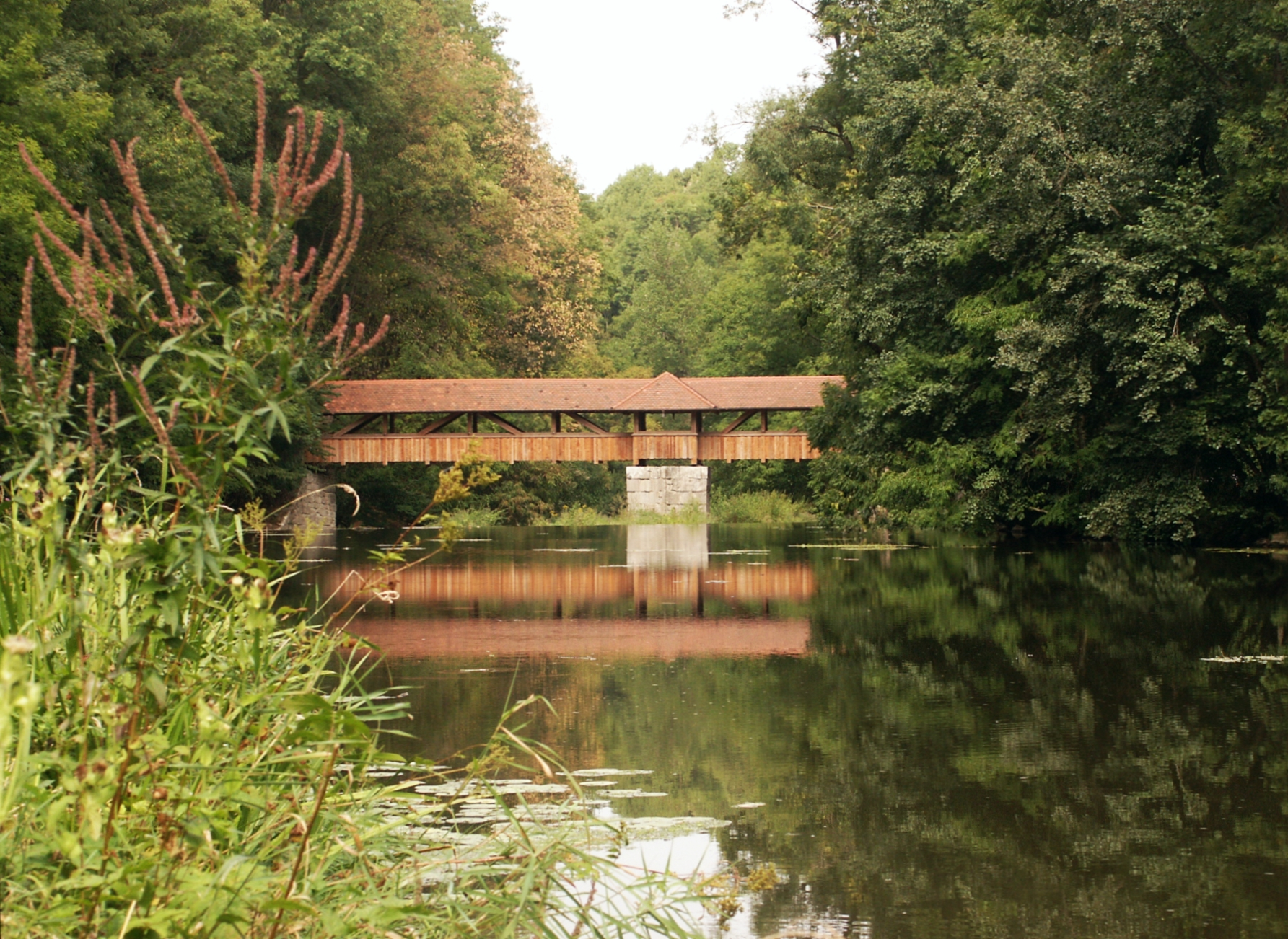
- The Jagst at the wooden bridge near the former "Heinzenmühle" (Heinzen-mill) between Crailsheim and Kirchberg

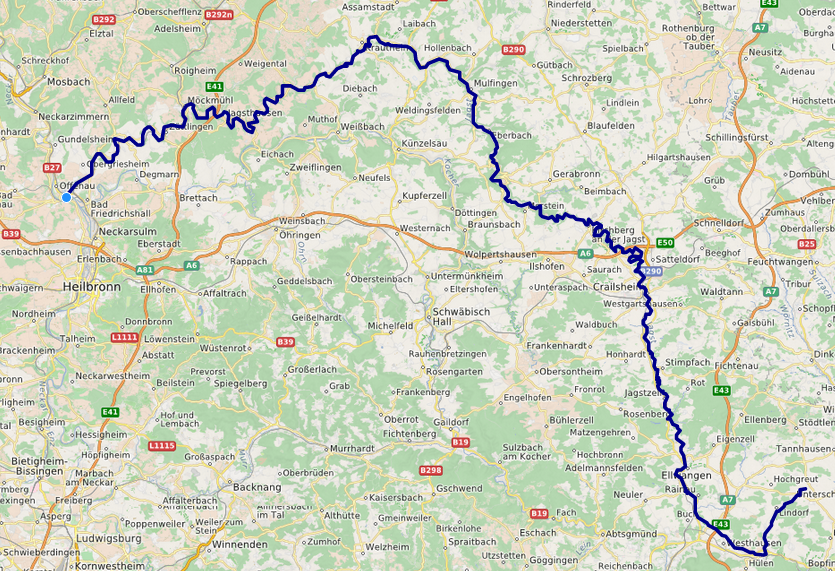

Location
- Country: Germany
- State: Baden-Württemberg

Physical characteristics
- Source
  - location: Swabian Alb
  - elevation: 519 m (1,703 ft)
- Mouth
  - location: Neckar
  - coordinates: 49°14′1″N 9°10′43″E
- Length: 190.0 km (118.1 mi)
- Basin size: 1,838 km^{2} (710 sq mi)
- Discharge
  - average: 18.6 m^{3}/s (660 cu ft/s)

Basin features
- Progression: Neckar→ Rhine→ North Sea

The Jagst (German pronunciation: [jakst]) is a right tributary of the Neckar in northern Baden-Württemberg, Germany. The source of this 190 km long river is in the hills east of Ellwangen, close to the Bavarian border. The Jagst winds through the towns of Ellwangen, Crailsheim, Kirchberg an der Jagst, Langenburg, Krautheim, Möckmühl and Neudenau. Near Bad Wimpfen, the Jagst flows into the Neckar, a few km downstream from the mouth of the river Kocher, that flows more or less parallel to the Jagst.

To the south of the river is the Harthausen Forest.

== Tributaries ==
The following rivers are tributaries to the river Jagst (from source to mouth):

- Left: Rotenbach, Orrot, Klingenbach, Steinbach, Speltach, Maulach, Grundbach, Ginsbach, Sindelbach
- Right: Röhlinger Sechta, Rechenberger Rot (Rotbach), Reiglersbach, Gronach, Brettach, Rötelbach, Ette, Erlenbach, Kessach, Hergstbach, Seckach, Schefflenz, Tiefenbach

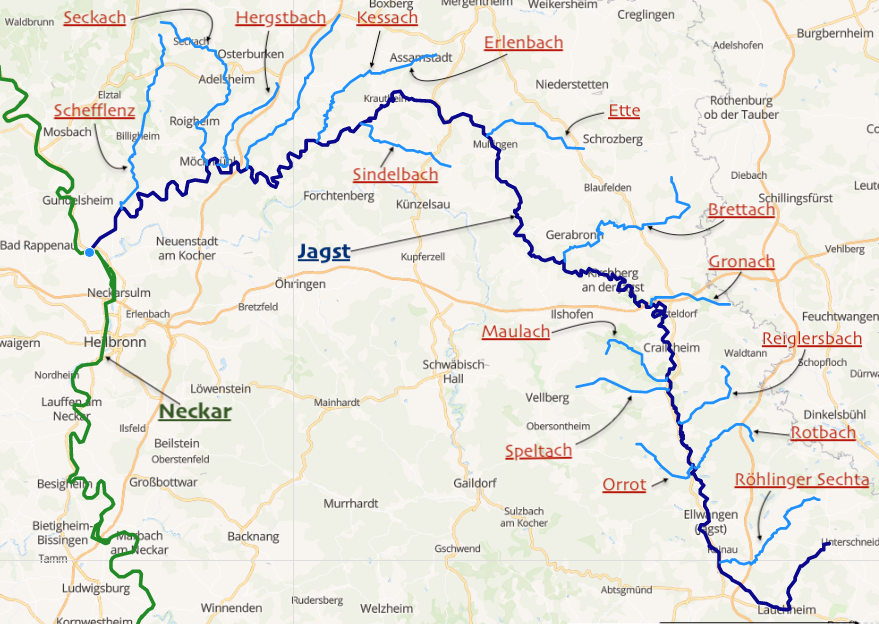
The river and its main tributaries

== See also ==
- List of rivers of Baden-Württemberg
